= History of Punjab =

The Punjab region is a geopolitical, cultural, and historical region in the northwest of South Asia, comprising the Punjab province in Pakistan and the Punjab state in India. It is believed that the earliest evidence of human habitation in Punjab traces to the Soan valley of the Pothohar, between the Indus and the Jhelum rivers, where the Soanian culture developed, from which remnants of stone tools have been found.

The Punjab region was the site of one of the earliest cradle of civilisations, the Bronze Age Harrapan civilisation that flourished between 2600 and 1900 BCE. Indo-Aryan tribes entered the region with the Indo-Aryan migrations during the 2nd millennium BCE. During the Vedic period (1500-500 BCE), the Rigveda was composed in Punjab, laying the foundation of Brahmanism. In the 6th century BC, Pushkarasarin, the monarch of Gandhara, assumed a role in halting the expansionary ambitions of the Achaemenid Empire until during the reign of Darius wherein tribute rendered by Gandhara to him is first documented. A century later, the Janapadas of Punjab encountered the expansive undertakings of Alexander. The Janapadas exhibited resistance to his advances, notably the Aśvaka of Gandhara, the Mallians of South Punjab, and Porus of Central Punjab. Following the demise of Alexander, Chandragupta Maurya, who had received his education in the city of Taxila, garnered support from republics such as Trigarta and Gandhara. He subsequently conquered the Nanda Empire, with Taxila being designated as the provincial capital of the Northwestern territories. After its decline, the Indo-Greeks, Indo-Sakas and Indo-Parthians successively established reigns in Punjab however other states maintained autonomy and other janapadas such as that of the Yaudheya and the Audumbaras in Eastern Punjab resisted their expansions. In the late 1st century AD the Kushan Empire annexed Punjab, and Gandhara's cultural zenith occurred during this period in which artwork from the region flourished.

The devastating Hunnic invasions of Punjab occurred in the 5th and 6th century, which were ultimately repelled by the Vardhana dynasty. Most of the western Punjab region became unified under the Taank and Odi Shahi Kingdoms in the early medieval period. Between the 8th and 12th century, the Tomara dynasty and Katoch dynasty controlled the eastern portions of Punjab. Islam became established in Punjab when the Umayyad Caliphate conquered southern portions of the region up to Multan, which became independent from the caliphate under the Emirate of Multan in 855. The Ghaznavids conquered region in 1025, after whom the Delhi Sultanate followed. The Langah Sultanate ruled much of the south Punjab in the 15th century.

The Mughal Empire, established in 1526 AD, has left an immense cultural and architectural legacy in Punjab. The city of Lahore became one of the largest in the world under Mughals. In the 16th century, Sikhism was founded by Guru Nanak in central Punjab which attracted many followers. After a long period of anarchy due to decline of Mughals in the 18th century, the Sikh Empire in 1799 unified most of the Punjab region. The region was conquered by the East India Company in 1849 after the Second Anglo-Sikh War and Punjab province was created in 1857. In 1947, Punjab was partitioned amidst wide-scale violence.

== Etymology ==
Though the name Punjab is of Persian origin, its two parts (پنج, panj, 'five' and آب, āb, 'water') are cognates of the Sanskrit words, पञ्‍च, pañca, 'five' and अप्, áp, 'water', of the same meaning. The word Pañjāb thus means 'The Land of Five Waters', referring to the rivers Jhelum, Chenab, Ravi, Sutlej, and Beas. All are tributaries of the Indus River, the Sutlej being the largest. References to a land of five rivers may be found in the Mahabharat, which calls one of the regions in Aryavarta Panchanada (Sanskrit: पञ्चनद, romanized: pañca-nada, lit. 'five rivers'). The ancient Greeks referred to the region as Pentapotamía (Greek: Πενταποταμία), which has the same meaning as the Persian word.

== Geographical extent ==
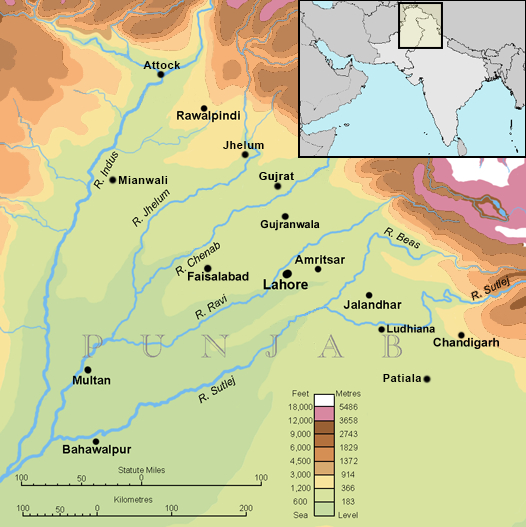
The region of Punjab (lit. [Land of] the Five Rivers)

Today the Punjab region is usually considered to consist of the Punjab province in Pakistan and the Punjab state in India. The boundaries of the region are ill-defined and focus on historical accounts and thus the geographical definition of the term "Punjab" has changed over time. In the 16th century, the Mughal Empire referred it to a relatively smaller area between the Indus and the Sutlej rivers. During the British Raj, the Punjab Province was a large administrative region encompassing the present-day Indian states and union territories of Punjab, Haryana, Himachal Pradesh, Chandigarh, and Delhi and the Pakistani regions of Punjab and Islamabad Capital Territory. It bordered Balochistan and North-West Frontier to the west, Jammu and Kashmir to the north, the Hindi Belt to the east, and Rajasthan and Sindh to the south.

== Prehistory ==
=== Paleolithic ===
Homo erectus lived on the Pothohar Plateau, in upper Punjab, Pakistan along the Soan River (nearby modern-day Rawalpindi) during the Pleistocene Epoch. Soanian sites are found in the Sivalik region across what are now India, Pakistan and Nepal. The Soanian culture was a prehistoric technological culture from the Siwalik Hills. It is named after the Soan Valley in Punjab, Pakistan. The Soanian culture has been approximated to have taken place during the Middle Pleistocene period or the mid-Holocene epoch (Northgrippian). Soanian artifacts were manufactured on quartzite pebbles, cobbles, and occasionally on boulders, all derived from various fluvial sources on the Siwalik landscape. Soanian assemblages generally comprise varieties of choppers, discoids, scrapers, cores, and numerous flake type tools, all occurring in varying typo-technological frequencies at different sites.

=== Neolithic ===
Relics and human skulls have been found dating back to 5000 BCE in the Pothohar Plateau in north of Punjab that indicate the region was home to Neolithic peoples who settled on the banks of the Swaan River, and who later developed small communities in the region around 3000 BCE.

== Bronze Age (3300 BC – 1300 BC) ==
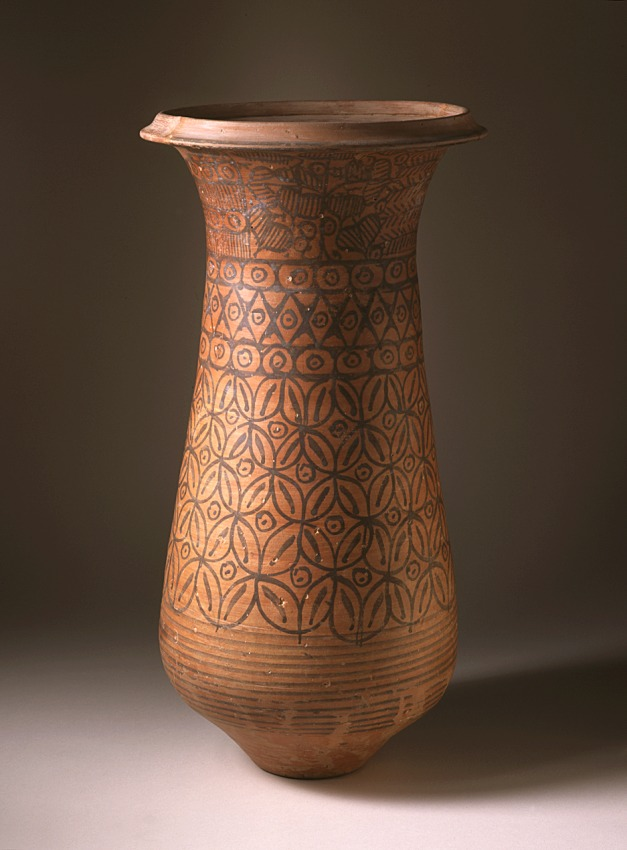
Ceremonial vessel; 2600 – 2450 BC; discovered from Harappa, Punjab, Pakistan.

The Indus Valley Civilisation is also known as the Harappan civilisation, after its type site Harappa, the first to be excavated early in the 20th century in Punjab. (Note: Habib: "Harappa, in Sahiwal district of west Punjab, Pakistan, had long been known to archaeologists as an extensive site on the Ravi river, but its true significance as a major city of an early great civilization remained unrecognized until the discovery of Mohenjo-daro near the banks of the Indus, in the Larkana district of Sindh, by Rakhaldas Banerji in 1922. Sir John Marshall, then Director General of the Archaeological Survey of India, used the term 'Indus civilization' for the culture discovered at Harappa and Mohenjo-daro, a term doubly apt because of the geographical context implied in the name 'Indus' and the presence of cities implied in the word 'civilization'. Others, notably the Archaeological Survey of India after Independence, have preferred to call it `Harappan', or 'Mature Harappan', taking Harappa to be its type-site.") The discovery of Harappa and soon afterwards Mohenjo-daro was the culmination of work that had begun after the founding of the Archaeological Survey of India in the British Raj in 1861.

The civilisation flourished both in the alluvial plain of the Indus River, which flows through the length of Pakistan, and along a system of perennial monsoon-fed rivers that once coursed in the vicinity of the Ghaggar-Hakra, a seasonal river in northwest India and eastern Pakistan.The cities of the ancient Indus were noted for their urban planning, baked brick houses, elaborate drainage systems, water supply systems, clusters of large non-residential buildings, and techniques of handicraft and metallurgy. (Note: These covered carnelian products, seal carving, work in copper, bronze, lead, and tin.) Mohenjo-daro and Harappa very likely grew to contain between 30,000 and 60,000 individuals, and the civilisation may have contained between one and five million individuals during its florescence. A gradual drying of the region during the 3rd millennium BCE may have been the initial stimulus for its urbanisation. Eventually it also reduced the water supply enough to cause the civilisation's demise and to disperse its population to the east.

== Iron Age (c. 1300 BC – 518 BC) ==
=== Vedic Era ===
In ancient times the region was known as Vahika as is attested by authors such as Pāṇini and Patanjali in the 6th century CE, in which they describe the region as a territory of Sanghas which denotes a republic form of government. Pāṇini further describes the ruling class of the Vahika republics with some dominated by Brahmins and others of 'Rajanyas' otherwise known as Kshatriyas. The Udichya region was another region mentioned in ancient texts and is noted by Pāṇini as comprising both the regions of Vahika and Gandhara. According to Rigvedic tradition, Yayati was the progenitor of the prominent Udichya tribes and had numerous sons, including Anu, Puru, and Druhyu. The lineage of Anu gave rise to the Madra, Kekaya, Sivi and Uśīnara kingdoms of central Punjab, while the Druhyu tribe has been associated with the Gandhara kingdom based in modern day KPK and the Pothohar Plateau of Punjab.

Map of Indian subcontinent in 500 BCE. Kingdoms of Gandhara, Kekaya, Madra, Trigarta and Sivi can be seen in Punjab in northwest.

Some of the early Janas of the Rig Veda can be strongly attributed to Punjab. Rig Vedic Janas such as the Druhyus, Anus, Purus, Yadus, Turvasas, Bharatas, and others were associated in Punjab and the Indo-Gangetic plain. Other Rig Vedic Janapadas such as the Pakhtas, Bhalanasas, Visanins, and Sivas were associated with areas in the north and west of Punjab.

==== Battle of the Ten Kings ====
An important event of the Rig Vedic era was the "Battle of Ten Kings" which was fought on the banks of the river Parusni (Ravi river) in central Punjab, in c. 14th century BCE, between the Bharata clan on the one hand and a confederation of ten tribes on the other. The ten tribes pitted against Sudas comprised five major tribes: the Purus, the Druhyus, the Anus, the Turvasas and the Yadus; in addition to five minor ones: the Pakthas, the Alinas, the Bhalanas, the Visanins and the Sivas. Sudas was supported by the Vedic Rishi Vasishtha, while his former Purohita, the Rishi Viswamitra, sided with the confederation of ten tribes. Sudas had earlier defeated Samvaran and ousted him from Hastinapur. It was only after the death of Sudas that Samvaran could return to his kingdom. A second battle, referred to as the Mahabharat in ancient texts, was fought in Punjab on a battlefield known as Kurukshetra. This was fought between the Pandavas and the Kauravas. Duryodhana, a descendant of Kuru (who was the son of king Samvaran), had tried to insult the Panchali princess Draupadi in revenge for defeating his ancestor Samvaran.

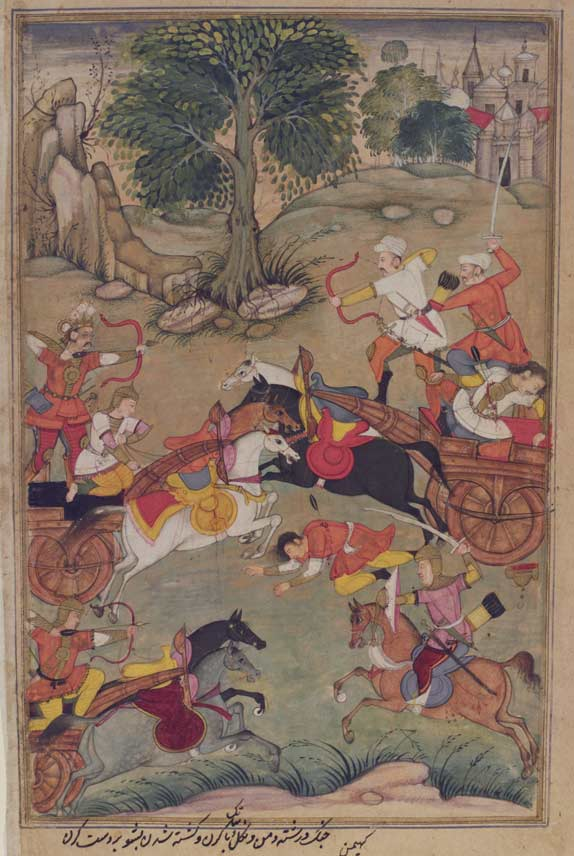
The Battle of Ten Kings was fought on the banks of River Parusni in Punjab – A depiction from Razmnama (1585)

Many Janapadas were mentioned from Vedic texts and there was a large level of contact between all the Janapadas with descriptions being given of trading caravans, movement of students from universities, and itineraries of princes. In its heyday, the University of ancient Taxila attracted students from all over Indian subcontinent as well as those from surrounding countries.

== Ancient Punjab (518 BC – c. 500 AD) ==
=== Pukkusāti and Achaemenid Gandāra (518 BC – 326 BC) ===
During the 6th century BCE, Gandhara was governed under the reign of King Pukkusāti. According to early Buddhist accounts, he had forged diplomatic ties with Magadha and achieved victories over neighbouring kingdoms such as that of the realm of Avanti. It is noted by R. C. Majumdar that Pukkusāti would have been contemporary to the Achamenid king Cyrus the Great and according to the scholar Buddha Prakash, Pukkusāti might have acted as a bulwark against the expansion of the Persian Achaemenid Empire into Gandhara. This hypothesis posits that the army which Nearchus claimed Cyrus had lost in Gedrosia had been defeated by Pukkusāti's Gāndhārī kingdom. Therefore, following Prakash's position, the Achaemenids would have been able to conquer Gandhāra only after a period of decline after the reign of Pukkusāti, combined with the growth of Achaemenid power under the kings Cambyses II and Darius I. However, the presence of Gandhāra, referred to as Ga^{n}dāra in Old Persian, among the list of Achaemenid provinces in Darius's Behistun Inscription confirms that his empire had inherited this region from conquests carried out earlier by Cyrus. It is unknown whether Pukkusāti remained in power after the Achaemenid conquest as a Persian vassal or if he was replaced by a Persian satrap, although Buddhist sources claim that he renounced his throne and became a monk after becoming a disciple of the Buddha. The annexation under Cyrus was limited to the Western sphere of Gandhāra as only during the reign of Darius the Great did the region between the Indus River and the Jhelum River become annexed. However Megasthenes Indica, states that the Achaemenids never conquered India and had only approached its borders after battling with the Massagetae, it further states that the Persians summoned mercenaries specifically from the Oxydrakai tribe, who were previously known to have resisted the incursions of Alexander the Great, but they never entered their armies into the region.

=== Alexander's invasion ===
Frequent intertribal wars stimulated the growth of larger groupings ruled by chieftains and kings, who ruled local kingdoms known as Mahajanapadas. The rise of kingdoms and dynasties in the Punjab is chronicled in the ancient Hindu epics, particularly the Mahabharata. In 326 B.C. The earliest known notable local king of this region was known as King Porus, who fought the famous Battle of the Hydaspes against Alexander the Great. His kingdom spanned between rivers Hydaspes (Jhelum) and Acesines (Chenab); Strabo had held the territory to contain almost 300 cities. He (alongside Abisares) had a hostile relationship with the Kingdom of Taxila which was ruled by his extended family. When the armies of Alexander crossed Indus in its eastward migration, probably in Udabhandapura, he was greeted by the-then ruler of Taxila, Omphis. Omphis had hoped to force both Porus and Abisares into submission leveraging the might of Alexander's forces and diplomatic missions were mounted, but while Abisares accepted the submission, Porus refused. This led Alexander to seek for a face-off with Porus. Thus began the Battle of the Hydaspes in 326 BC; the exact site remains unknown. The battle is thought to have resulted in a decisive Greek victory; however, A. B. Bosworth warns against an uncritical reading of Greek sources who were obviously exaggerative. Alexander later founded two cities—Nicaea at the site of victory and Bucephalous at the battle-ground, in memory of his horse, who died soon after the battle. (Note: Craterus supervised the construction. These cities are yet to be identified.) Later, tetradrachms would be minted depicting Alexander on horseback, armed with a sarissa and attacking a pair of Indians on an elephant. Porus refused to surrender and wandered about atop an elephant, until he was wounded and his force routed.

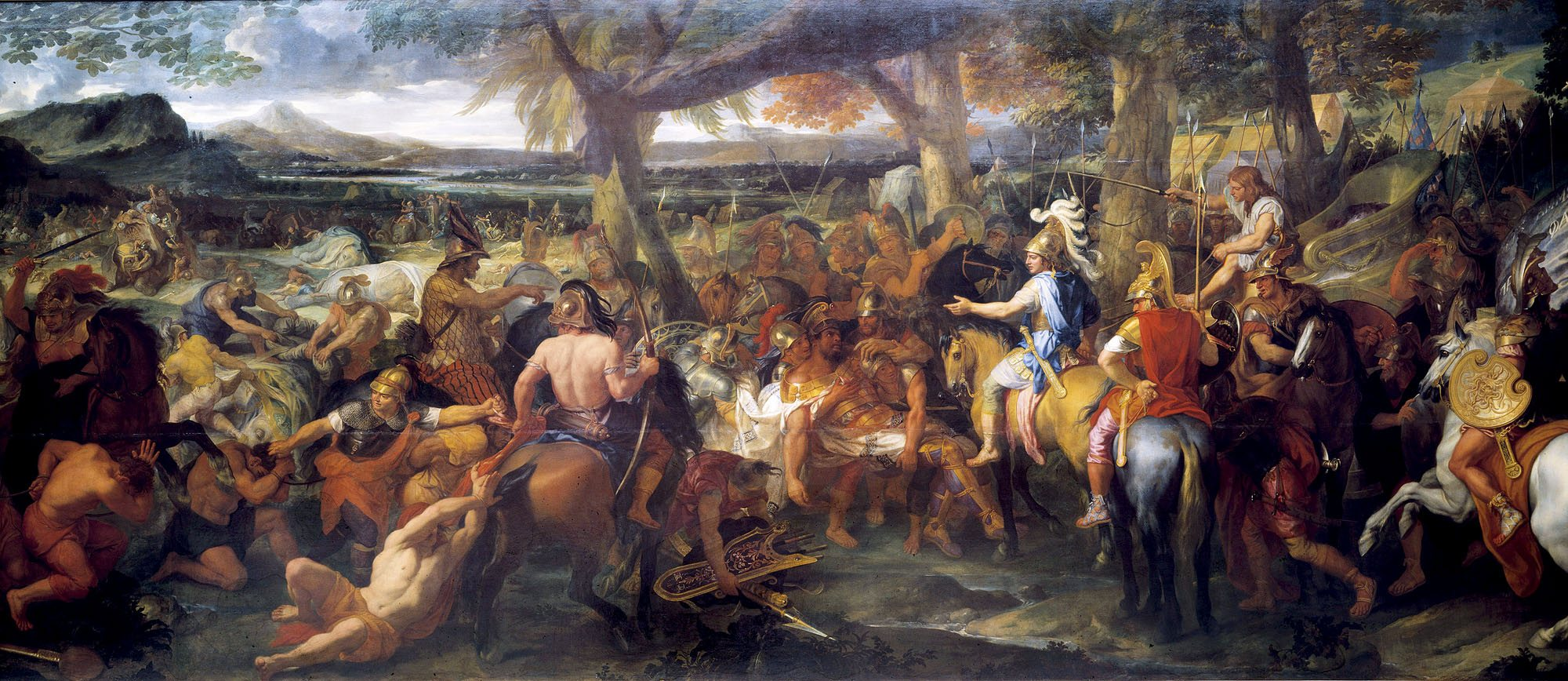
Alexander and Porus during the Battle of the Hydaspes – painting by Charles Le Brun (1673)

When asked by Alexander how he wished to be treated, Porus replied "Treat me as a king would treat another king". Despite the apparently one-sided results, Alexander was impressed by Porus and chose to not depose him. Not only was his territory reinstated but also expanded with Alexander's forces annexing the territories of Glausaes, who ruled to the northeast of Porus' kingdom.

After battle of Hydaspes, Alexander moved further southward during his campaign in Punjab which brought him in confrontation to the Mallian tribe in the south Punjab. The Malli, together with nearby tribe of oxydrakai, gathered an army of 90,000 personnel to fight against an army of 50,000 Greeks. Alexander started his Mallian campaign and advanced quickly than the expectations of the Mallians. Many of them were killed and rest fled to the Mallian capital, Multan. Alexander besieged the city after arriving there some days later. During the siege of the city's citadel, Alexander reputedly leaped into the inner area of the citadel, where he killed the Mallians' leader. Alexander was wounded by an arrow that had penetrated his lung, leaving him severely injured. The Greek army thereafter started killing civilians and animals and whatever came in their way to take revenge of their injured leader. The Mallian army eventually surrendered, preventing further bloodshed.

=== Mauryan Empire (316 BC – 180 BC) ===
During the Mauryan era, Punjab held a pivotal position as a core territory within the empire, with Taxila serving as the provincial capital of the North West in Gandhara. Chanakya, a prominent figure in the establishment of the Mauryan Empire, played a key role by adopting Chandragupta Maurya, the initial Mauryan emperor. Under Chanakya's tutelage, Chandragupta received a comprehensive education at Taxila, encompassing various arts of the time, including military training, for a duration spanning 7–8 years. Plutarch's accounts suggest that Alexander the Great encountered a young Chandragupta Maurya in the Punjab region, possibly during his time at the university. Subsequent to Alexander's death, Chanakya and Chandragupta allied with Trigarta king Parvataka to conquer the Nanda Empire. This alliance resulted in the formation of a composite army, comprising Gandharans and Kambojas, as documented in the Mudrarakshasa.

According to the Taranatha, following the death of Ashoka, the northwestern region seceded from the Maurya Empire, and Virasena emerged as its king. Noteworthy for his diplomatic endeavors, Virasena's successor, Subhagasena, maintained relations with the Seleucid Greeks. This engagement is corroborated by Polybius, who records an instance where Antiochus III the Great descended into India to renew his ties with King Subhagasena in 206 BCE, subsequently receiving a substantial gift of 150 elephants from the monarch.

The chief of the Mauryan military was also always a Yaudheyan warrior according to the Bijaygadh Pillar inscription, which states that the Yaudheyas elected their own chief who also served as the general for the Mauryans. The Mauryan military was also made up vastly of men from the Punjab Janapadas.

=== Indo-Greek Kingdom (c. 180 BC – c. 20 BC) ===
The Indo-Greek Kingdom was founded when the Graeco-Bactrian king Demetrius (and later Eucratides) invaded Punjab from Bactria in 200 BC, taking advantage of decline of Mauryans. The Greeks in the Indian subcontinent were eventually divided from the Graeco-Bactrians centered on Bactria (now the border between Afghanistan and Uzbekistan), and the Indo-Greeks in the present-day northwestern Indian subcontinent. Later, Menander I Soter conquered Punjab and made Sagala (present-day Sialkot) the capital of the Indo-Greek Kingdom. Menander is noted for having become a patron and convert to Greco-Buddhism and he is widely regarded as the greatest of the Indo-Greek kings.

The expression "Indo-Greek Kingdom" loosely describes a number of various dynastic polities, traditionally associated with a number of regional capitals like Taxila, Pushkalavati and Sagala. Other potential centers are only hinted at; for instance, Ptolemy's Geographia and the nomenclature of later kings suggest that a certain Theophila in the south of the Indo-Greek sphere of influence may also have been a satrapal or royal seat at one time.

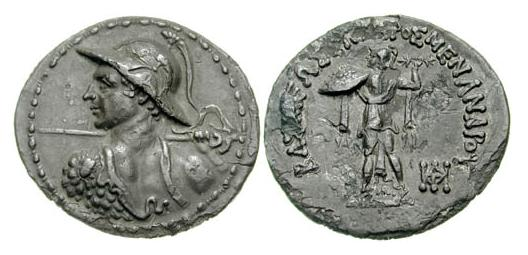
Menander I (155–130 BC) is the most famous Indo-Greek king mentioned in both Graeco-Roman and Indian sources. The capital of the Indo-Greeks during his reign was Sagala in Punjab.

During the two centuries of their rule, the Indo-Greek kings combined the Greek and Indian languages and symbols, as seen on their coins, and blended Greek and Indian ideas, as seen in the archaeological remains. The diffusion of Indo-Greek culture had consequences which are still felt today, particularly through the influence of Greco-Buddhist art. Following the death of Menander, most of his empire splintered and Indo-Greek influence was considerably reduced. Many new kingdoms and republics east of the Ravi River began to mint new coinage depicting military victories. The most prominent entities to form were the Yaudheya Republic, Arjunayanas, and the Audumbaras. The Yaudheyas and Arjunayanas both are said to have won "victory by the sword" and the Audumbaras are said to of checked the Indo-Greek advance all the way up the upper bari doab, depicting a short Indo-Greek rule in Eastern Punjab. The Datta dynasty and Mitra dynasty soon followed in Mathura. The Indo-Greeks ultimately disappeared as a political entity around 10 AD following the invasions of the Indo-Scythians, although pockets of Greek populations probably remained for several centuries longer under the subsequent rule of the Indo-Parthians and Kushans. (Note: "When the Greeks of Bactria and India lost their kingdom they were not all killed, nor did they return to Greece. They merged with the people of the area and worked for the new masters; contributing considerably to the culture and civilization in southern and central Asia." Narain, "The Indo-Greeks" 2003, p. 278)

=== Indo-Scythian Kingdom ===
The Indo-Scythians were descended from the Sakas (Scythians) who migrated from southern Siberia to Punjab and Arachosia from the middle of the 2nd century BCE to the 1st century BCE. They displaced the earlier Indo-Greeks. The power of the Saka rulers started to decline in the 2nd century CE and soon they were replaced with Indo-Parthians by the mid 1st century AD.

Some Aprachas are documented on the Silver Reliquary discovered at Sirkap, near Taxila, designating the title "Stratega," denoting a position equivalent to Senapati, such as that of Indravarma who was a general during the reign of the Apracharaja Vijayamitra. Indravarma is additionally noteworthy for receiving the above-mentioned Silver Reliquary from the Indo-Scythian monarch Kharahostes, which he subsequently re-dedicated as a Buddhist reliquary, indicating was a gift in exchange for tribute or assistance. According to another reliquary inscription Indravarma is noted as the Lord of Gandhara and general during the reign of Vijayamitra. According to Apracha chronology, Indravarma was the son of Visnuvarma, an Aprachraja preceding Vijayamitra.

Indravarmas son Aspavarma is situated between 20 and 50 CE, during which numismatic evidence overlaps him with the Indo-Scythian ruler Azes II and Gondophares of the Indo-Parthians whilst also describing him as 'Stratega' or general of the Aprachas. In accordance with a Buddhist Avadana, Aspavarma and a Saka noble, Jhadamitra, engaged in discussions concerning the establishment of accommodation for monks during the rainy seasons, displaying that he was a patron of Buddhism. A reliquary inscription dedicated to 50 CE, by a woman named Ariasrava, describes that her donation was made during the reign of Gondophares nephew, Abdagases I, and Aspavarma, describing the joint rule by the Aprachas and the Indo-parthians.

==== Indo-Parthian Kingdom (c. 30 AD – c. 50 AD) ====
The Indo-Parthian Kingdom was founded by Gondophares, and active from 19 CE to c. 226 CE. The city of Taxila is thought to have been a capital of the Indo-Parthians however this is where the Eastern boundary of the empire was limited to. The Greek philosopher Apollonius of Tyana is related by Philostratus in Life of Apollonius of Tyana to have visited India, and specifically the city of Taxila around 46 AD. He describes constructions of the Greek type, probably referring to Sirkap, and explains that the Indo-Parthian king of Taxila, named Phraotes, received a Greek education at the court. The kingdom was conquered in the 1st century AD by the Kushan empire.

During the dominion of the Indo-Parthians, Apracharaja Sasan, as described on numismatic evidence identifying him as the nephew of Aspavarma, emerged as a figure of significance. Aspavarman, a preceding Apracharaja contemporaneous with Gondophares, was succeeded by Sasan, after having ascended from a subordinate governance role to a recognized position as one of Gondophares's successors. He assumed the position following Abdagases I. The Kushan ruler Vima Takto is known through numismatic evidence to have overstruck the coins of Sasan, whilst a numismatic hoard had found coins of Sasan together with smaller coins of Kujula Kadphises It has also been discovered that Sasan overstruck the coins of Nahapana of the Western Satraps, this line of coinage dating between 40 and 78 CE.

It was noted by Philostratus and Apollonius of Tyana upon their visit with Phraotes in 46 AD, that during this time the Gandharans living between the Kabul River and Taxila had coinage of Orichalcum and Black brass, and their houses appearing as single-story structures from the outside, but upon entering, underground rooms were also present. They describe Taxila as being the same size as Nineveh, being walled like a Greek city whilst also being shaped with Narrow roads, and further describe Phraotes kingdom as containing the old territory of Porus. Following an exchange with the king, Phraotes is reported to have subsidized both barbarians and neighbouring states, to avert incursions into his kingdom. Phraotes also recounts that his father, being the son of a king, had become an orphan from a young age. In accordance with Indian customs, two of his relatives assumed responsibility for his upbringing until they were killed by rebellious nobles during a ritualistic ceremony along the Indus River. This event led to the usurpation of the throne, compelling Phraotes' father to seek refuge with the king situated beyond the Hydaspes River, in modern-day Punjab, a ruler esteemed greater than Phraotes' father. Moreover, Phraotes states that his father received an education facilitated by the Brahmins upon request to the king and married the daughter of the Hydaspian king, whilst having one son who was Phraotes himself. Phraotes proceeds to narrate the opportune moment he seized to reclaim his ancestral kingdom, sparked by a rebellion of the citizens of Taxila against the usurpers. With fervent support from the populace, Phraotes led a triumphant entry into the residence of the usurpers, whilst the citizens brandished torches, swords, and bows in a display of unified resistance.

=== Kushan Empire (c. 50 AD – c. 350 AD) ===
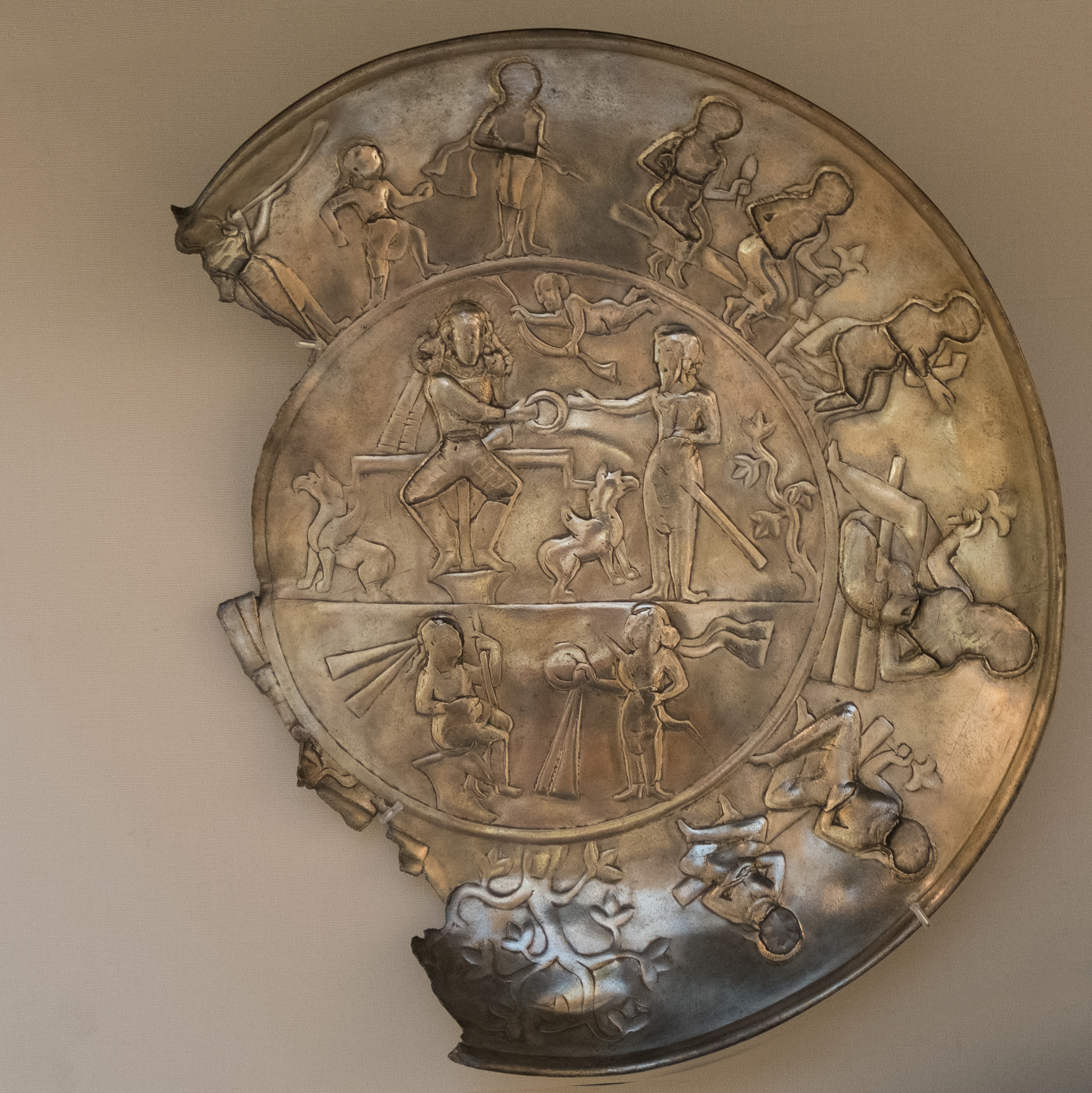
Possible Kushano-Sasanian plate, excavated in Rawalpindi, fourth century CE. British Museum.

About the middle of the 1st century CE, the Kushan Empire expanded out of central Asia into the Punjab under the leadership of their first emperor, Kujula Kadphises. They were descended from an Indo-European, Central Asian people called the Yuezhi, a branch of which was known as the Kushans. By the time of his grandson, Kanishka, the empire spread to encompass much of south Asia at least as far as Saketa and Sarnath near Varanasi (Benares). By the 3rd century, their empire in Indian subcontinent was disintegrating and their last known great emperor was Vasudeva I. Following territory losses in the west (Bactria lost to the Kushano-Sasanians), and in the east (loss of Mathura to the Gupta Empire), several "Little Kushans" are known, who ruled locally in the area of Punjab with their capital at Taxila: Vasudeva II (270–300), Mahi (300–305), Shaka (305–335) and Kipunada (335–350). They probably were vassals of the Gupta Empire, until the invasion of the Kidarites destroyed the last remains of Kushan rule. In the early 3rd century BC, a union formed between the Punjab janapadas to expel the Kushans, resulting in a Kushan defeat and them being pushed all the way out of Eastern Punjab. Thus starting the fall of the empire and resulting in a century of peace in Punjab before the Gupta expansion.

=== Hunnic migrations (c. 350 AD – c. 500 AD) ===
After decline of Kushan empire, the central Asian Huns started migrating towards Punjab and other regions of Pakistan. First of them were the Kidarites, who around 390 AD invaded Punjab and replaced remaining remnants of the Kushans. They seem to have retained the western part of the Gupta Empire, particularly central and western Punjab, until they were displaced by the invasion of the Alchon Huns at the end of the 5th century.

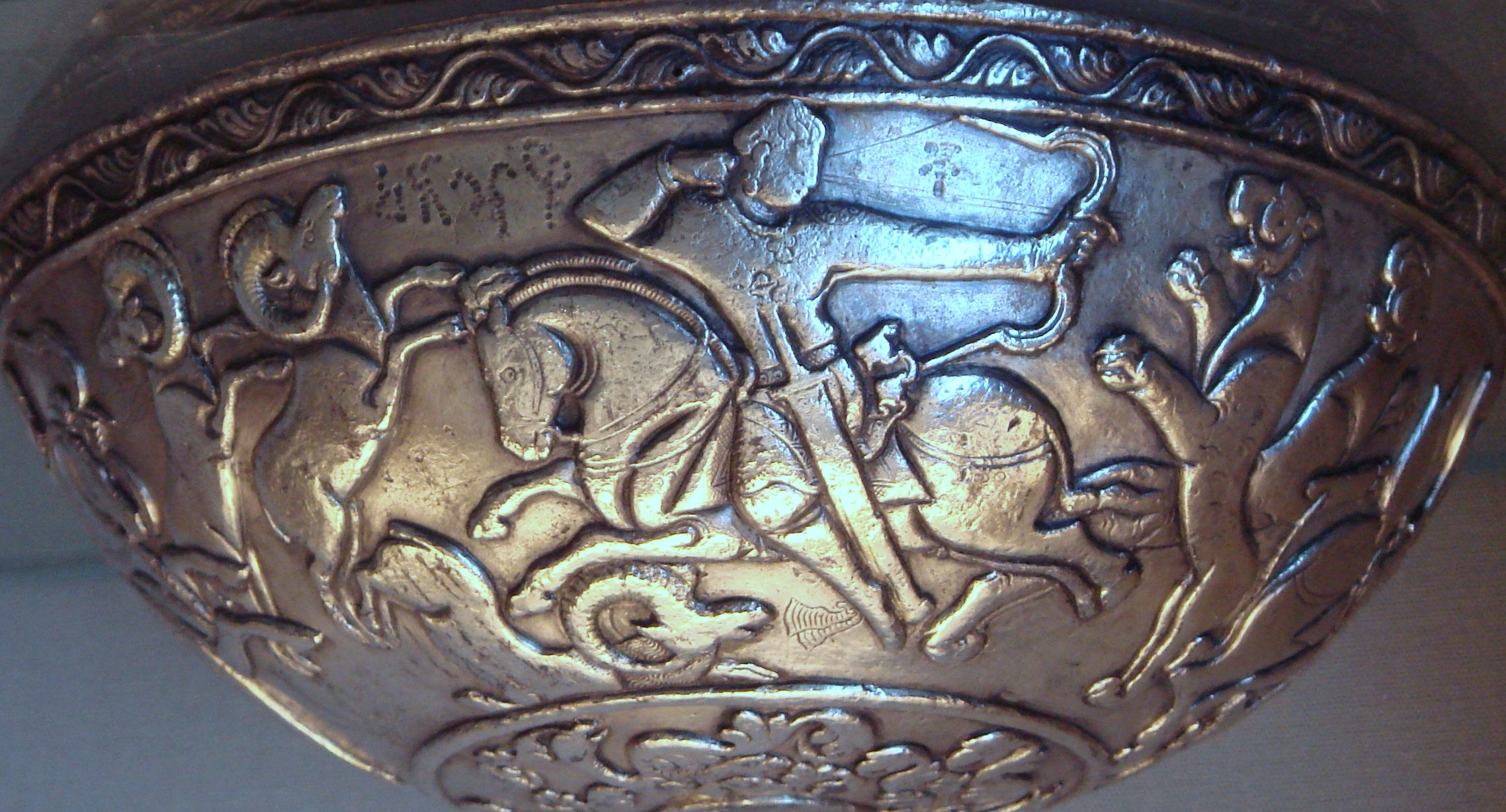
The Hephthalite bowl from Gandhara (5th century AD) features two Kidarite royal hunters as well as two Alchon hunters, suggesting a period of peaceful coexistence between the two entities.

The Alchon Huns were a nomadic people who invaded South Asia during the 5th and 6th centuries AD. They were first mentioned as being located in Paropamisus. Between 460 and 470 AD, the Alchons took over Gandhara and Western Punjab which also had remained under the control of the Kidarites, while the Gupta Empire remained further east. Their most famous ruler was Mihirakula who had capital in Sagala in northern Punjab.

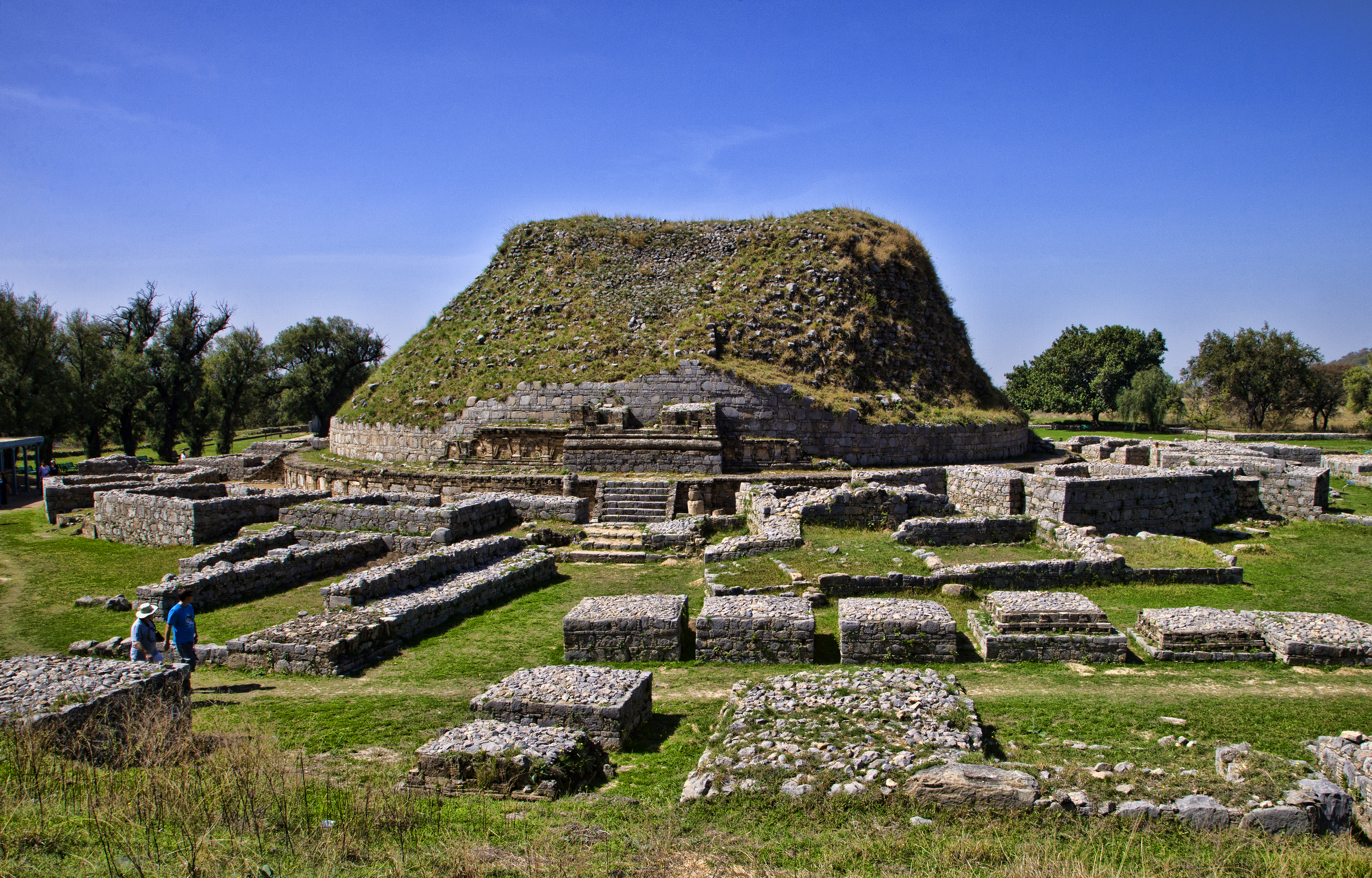
Ruins of Dharmarajika Stupa in Taxila. It was destroyed during the Hunnic invasions in the 5th century.

The Alchons apparently undertook the mass destruction of Buddhist monasteries and stupas at Taxila, a high center of learning, which never recovered from the destruction.

== Medieval Punjab (c. 500 AD – 1526 AD) ==
=== Hindu Shahis (9th century AD – 11th century AD) ===
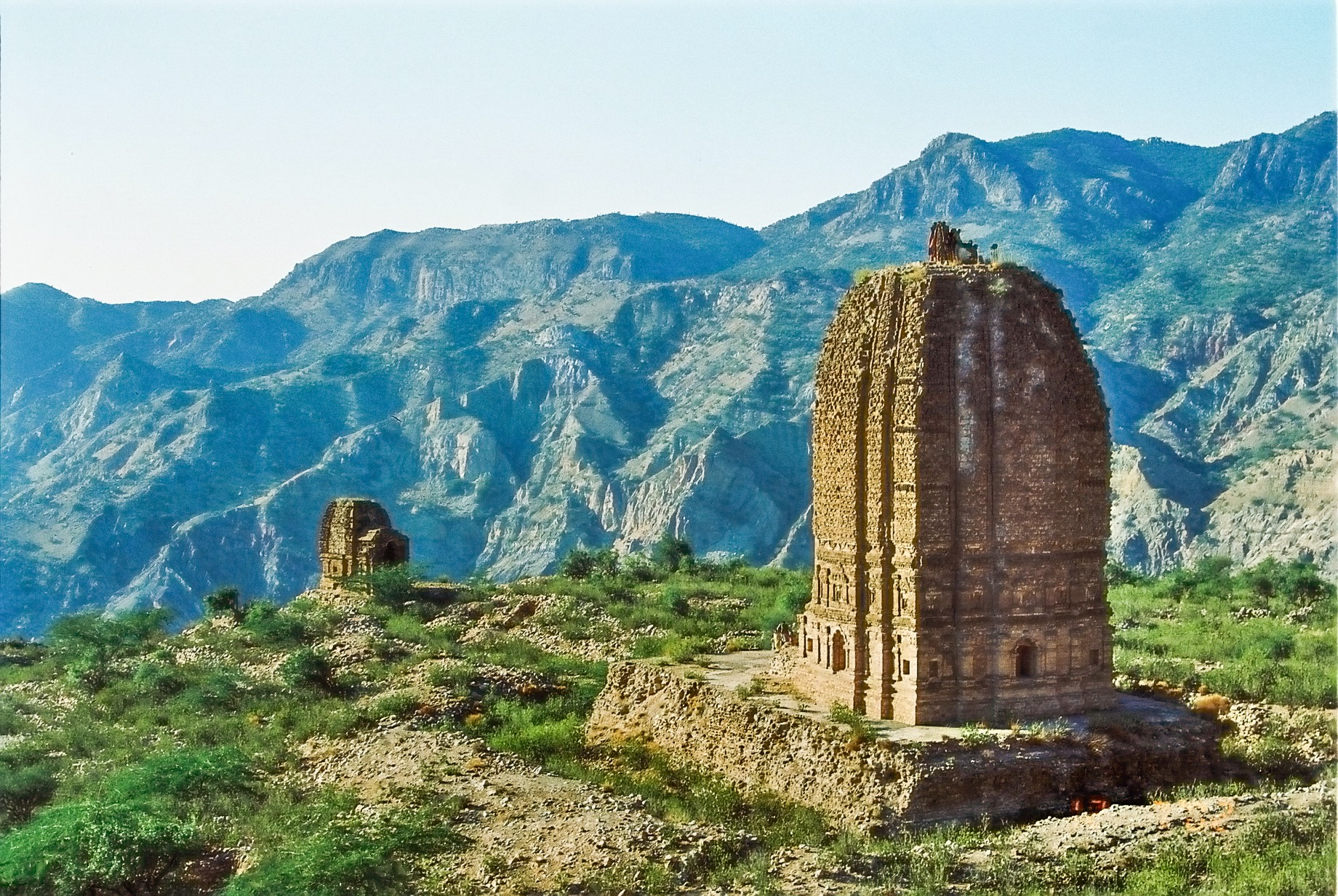
Amb Temples, built by the Hindu Shahi dynasty between the 7th and 9th centuries CE in Sakesar.

In the ninth century, the Hindu Shahi dynasty originating from the region of Oddiyana in the Swat Valley, replaced the Taank kingdom in the Punjab, ruling much of Western Punjab along with eastern Afghanistan. In the 10th century, the tribe of the Gakhars/Khokhars formed a large part of the Hindu Shahi army according to the Persian historian Firishta. Three of the most notable rulers were Lalliya, Bhimadeva and Jayapala.

Lalliya had reclaimed the territory at and around Kabul between 879 and 901 BC after it had been lost under his predecessor to the Saffarid dynasty. He was described as a fearsome Shahi. Two of his ministers reconstructed by Rahman as Toramana and Asata are said to of have taken advantage of Amr al-Layth's preoccupation with rebellions in Khorasan, by successfully raiding Ghazna around 900 BC.

After a defeat in Eastern Afghanistan suffered on the Shahi ally Lawik, Bhimadeva mounted a combined attack around 963 BC. Abu Ishaq Ibrahim was expelled from Ghazna and Shahi-Lawik strongholds were restored in Kabul and adjacent areas. This victory appears to have been commemorated in the Hund Slab Inscription (HSI):

=== Arrival of Islam and the Emirate of Multan ===
At the beginning of the 8th century, Arab armies of the Umayyad Caliphate penetrated into South Asia. In 712 the Umayyads conquered Sindh and Southern Punjab up to Multan, and Islam emerged as a major power in the southern Punjab. The newly conquered region became known as Sind and was the easternmost state of the Umayyad Caliphate. Umayyad rule was later replaced with Abbasid rule in 750.

Around the 850s, Abbasid authority in Sind weakened and five independent principalities emerged. The Banu Munnabih established themselves based at Multan. The Banu Munnabih later gave allegiance to the Abbasids, and remained unchallenged for over a century. Visitors at the time noted the power, prestige and prosperity brought to the region under Banu Munnabih rule.

Between 982–5, the power of the Banu Munnabih began to erode and Multan was conquered by Halam b. Shayban on behalf of the Fatimid caliph based in Egypt. By 985, the traveller Al-Maqdisi noted that the city of Multan was Shia, that the Friday sermon was in the name of the Fatimid and all decisions are taken in accordance with his commands.

=== Ghaznavid Empire (10th century AD – 12th century AD) ===
In 977, Sabuktigin, the Samanid governor of Ghazni, established an independent kingdom in western Afghanistan with Ghazni as its capital. When the Ghaznavids began expanding eastwards they came into conflict with the Hindu Shahis. This led to the Hindu Shahi ruler to form an alliance with Rajput rulers in the Punjab to check the Ghaznavid expansion.

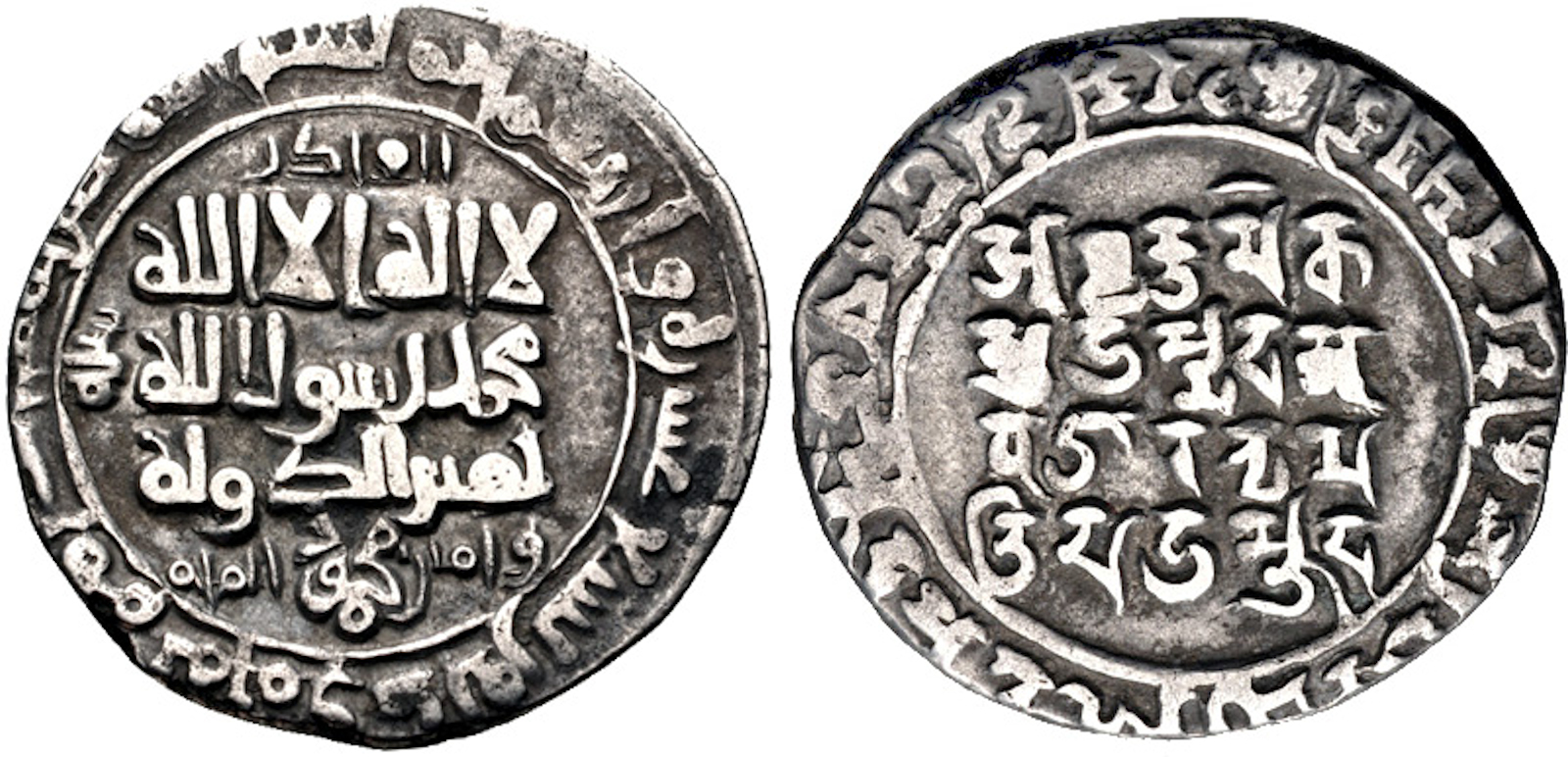
Silver jitals of Mahmud of Ghazni with bilingual Arabic and Sanskrit minted in Lahore in 1028 CE

Sabuktigin's son Mahmud succeeded his father in 997, and began a series of raids into northern India. In 1001 he defeated Jayapala at the Battle of Peshawar and seized Hindu Shahi territory north of the river Sindh. In 1006 Mahmud attacked the Kingdom of Multan, returning a few years later to massacre the local Ismaili population.

Jayapala's son and grandson, Anandapala and Trilochanapala respectively, resisted Mahmud for another quarter of a century and later by Bhimapala and local Ghakkhar chieftains until Mu'izz ad-Din Muhammad's victory in Second battle of Tarain in 1192. Mahmud's battles against the Hindu Shahi between 1001 and 1026 were significant in establishing Muslim political dominance in the Afghanistan region and surrounding Gandhar region west of Punjab. After Ghazni was conquered by Ghurid Empire, the capital of the Ghaznavids shifted to Lahore in Punjab which remained as their last capital.

=== Delhi Sultanate ===
Earliest mention of the region under the name Panjāb date to the early period of Delhi Sultanate, such as in the Tārīkḣ-i Waṣṣāf of the 13th century historian Wassaf, who described it as a region irrigated by Indus [Sind], Jhelum [Jelum], Lahore [Lohawar] (now known as Ravi), Satluj [Satlut] and Beas [Biyaha] rivers.

In 1173 the Ghurid dynasty replaced the Ghaznavids in Ghazni, and under Muhammad of Ghor they began expanding eastwards. Between 1175 and 1192, the Ghurid dynasty occupied the cities of Uch, Multan, Peshawar, Lahore, and Delhi. In 1206, the Ghurid general Qutb-al-din Aybeg and his successor Iltutmish founded the first of the series of Delhi Sultanates. Each dynasty would be an alternation of various inner-Asian military lords and their clients, constantly vying for power. These sultanates would make Delhi a safe haven for Muslim Turks and Persians who would flee the eventual Mongol invasions.

==== Khilji dynasty (1290 AD – 1320 AD) ====
The Khalji dynasty was the second dynasty of the Delhi sultanates, ruling from 1290 to 1320. This dynasty was a short-lived one, and extended Islamic rule to Gujarat, Rajasthan, the Deccan, and parts of Southern India. The first Mongol invasion of Punjab occurred when they were pursuing the Khwarezmian Shah, Jalal ad-Din, who was defeated in the Battle of Indus in 1221. The early period of te dynasty saw numerous Mongol invasions of Punjab, and the cities of Multan and Lahore were even sacked. Ultimately, they were defeated during the rule by its able generals, Zafar Khan, Ayn al-Mulk Multani and Ghazi Malik who were Punjab Muslims. In the winter of 1297, the Chagatai noyan Kadar led an army that ravaged the Punjab region, and advanced as far as Kasur. Alauddin's army, led by Ulugh Khan and probably Zafar Khan defeated the invaders on the Battle of Jaran-Manjur near Lahore in 1298 where quite a large number of them were taken prisoner.

==== Tughlaq dynasty (1320 AD – 1410 AD) ====
The Tughlaq dynasty's reign formally started in 1320 in Delhi when Ghazi Malik assumed the throne under the title of Ghiyath al-Din Tughluq after defeating Khusrau Khan at the Battle of Lahrawat.

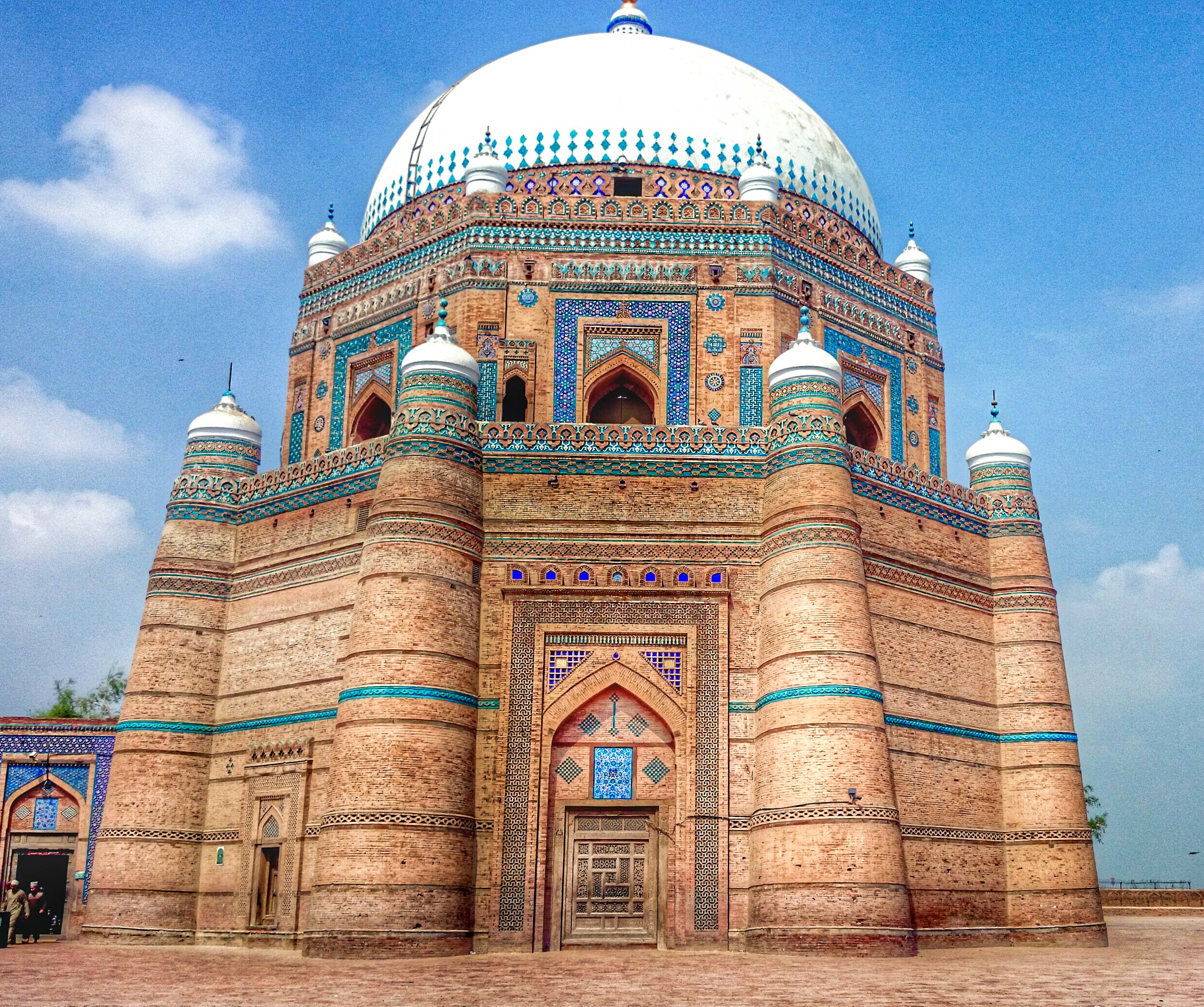
Tomb of Shah Rukn-e-Alam at Multan, built during the reign of Ghiyas-ud-Din Tughluq in 1320 AD

During Ghazi Maliks reign, in 1321 he sent his eldest son Jauna Khan, later known as Muhammad bin Tughlaq, to Deogir to plunder the Hindu kingdoms of Arangal and Tilang (now part of Telangana). His first attempt was a failure. Four months later, Ghiyasuddin Tughlaq sent large army reinforcements for his son asking him to attempt plundering Arangal and Tilang again. This time Jauna Khan succeeded and Arangal fell, it was renamed to Sultanpur, and all plundered wealth, state treasury and captives were transferred from the captured kingdom to the Delhi Sultanate.The Muslim aristocracy in Lukhnauti (Bengal) invited Ghiyasuddin Tughlaq to extend his coup and expand eastwards into Bengal by attacking Shamsuddin Firoz Shah, which he did over 1324–1325 AD, after placing Delhi under control of his son Ulugh Khan, and then leading his army to Lukhnauti. Ghiyasuddin Tughlaq succeeded in this campaign.

After his father's death in 1325 CE, Muhammed Bin Tughlaq assumed power and his rule saw the empire expand to most of the Indian subcontinent, its peak in terms of geographical reach. He attacked and plundered Malwa, Gujarat, Lakhnauti, Chittagong, Mithila and many other regions in India His distant campaigns were expensive, although each raid and attack on non-Muslim kingdoms brought new looted wealth and ransom payments from captured people. The extended empire was difficult to retain, and rebellions all over Indian subcontinent became routine. Muhammad bin Tughlaq died in March 1351 while trying to chase and punish people for rebellion and their refusal to pay taxes in Sindh and Gujarat.

The Tughlaq empire after Muhammed Bin Tughluqs death was in a state of disarray with many regions assuming independence, it was at this point that Firuz Shah Tughlaq, Ghazi Maliks nephew, took reign. His father's name was Rajab (the younger brother of Ghazi Malik) who had the title Sipahsalar. His mother Naila was a Punjabi Bhatti princess (daughter of Rana Mal) from Dipalpur and Abohar according to the historian William Crooke. The southern states had drifted away from the Sultanate and there were rebellions in Gujarat and Sindh", while "Bengal asserted its independence." He led expeditions against Bengal in 1353 and 1358. He captured Cuttack, desecrated the Jagannath Temple, Puri, and forced Raja Gajpati of Jajnagar in Orissa to pay tribute. He also laid siege to the Kangra Fort and forced Nagarkot to pay tribute. During his time Tatar Khan of Greater Khorasan attacked Punjab however he was defeated and his face slashed by the sword given by Feroz Shah Tughlaq to Raja Kailas Pal who ruled the Nagarkot region in Punjab.

==== Sayyid Dynasty (1410–40 AD) ====
After the death of the last Tughluq ruler Nasir-ud-din Mahmud, the Punjabi or Arab chieftain Khizr Khan established the Sayyid dynasty, the fourth dynasty of the Delhi Sultanate after the fall of the Tughlaqs.

Following Timur's 1398 Sack of Delhi, he appointed Khizr Khan as deputy of Multan (Punjab). He held Lahore, Dipalpur, Multan and Upper Sindh. Khizr Khan captured Delhi on 28 May 1414 thereby establishing the Sayyid dynasty. Khizr Khan did not take up the title of Sultan, but continued the fiction of his allegiance to Timur as Rayat-i-Ala(vassal) of the Timurids – initially that of Timur, and later his son Shah Rukh. After the accession of Khizr Khan, the Punjab, Uttar Pradesh and Sindh were reunited under the Delhi Sultanate, where he spent his time subduing rebellions. Punjab was the powerbase of Khizr Khan and his successors as the bulk of the Delhi army during their reigns came from Multan and Dipalpur.

Khizr Khan was succeeded by his son Sayyid Mubarak Shah after his death on 20 May 1421. Mubarak Shah referred to himself as Muizz-ud-Din Mubarak Shah on his coins, removing the Timurid name with the name of the Caliph, and declared himself a Shah. He defeated the advancing Hoshang Shah Ghori, ruler of Malwa Sultanate and forced him to pay heavy tribute early in his reign. Mubarak Shah also put down the rebellion of Jasrath Khokhar and managed to fend off multiple invasions by the Timurids of Kabul.

The last ruler of the Sayyids, Ala-ud-Din, voluntarily abdicated the throne of the Delhi Sultanate in favour of Bahlul Khan Lodi on 19 April 1451, and left for Badaun, where he died in 1478.

The neighboring Jaunpur Sultanate from 1399 to 1493 was ruled by Malik Qaranfal and his descendants who was stated to be a member of the Sayyid dynasty.

==== Lodi Dynasty (1451 AD − 1526 AD) ====
Later, Bahlul Lodi captured Delhi and founded the Lodi dynasty, the last of the Delhi sultanate. The Lodi dynasty reached its peak under Bahlul's Lodhi SonSikander Lodi. Various road and irrigation projects were taken under his rule, and the rule had patronized Persian culture. Despite this, there was still persecution of the local Hindu people as many temples, such as that of Mathura, were destroyed and had a system of widespread discrimination against Hindus. The rule of Ibrahim Khan Lodi, the last Lodi emperor, emperor was a weak one and was eclipsed by the arrival of Babur's army.

=== Langah Sultanate ===
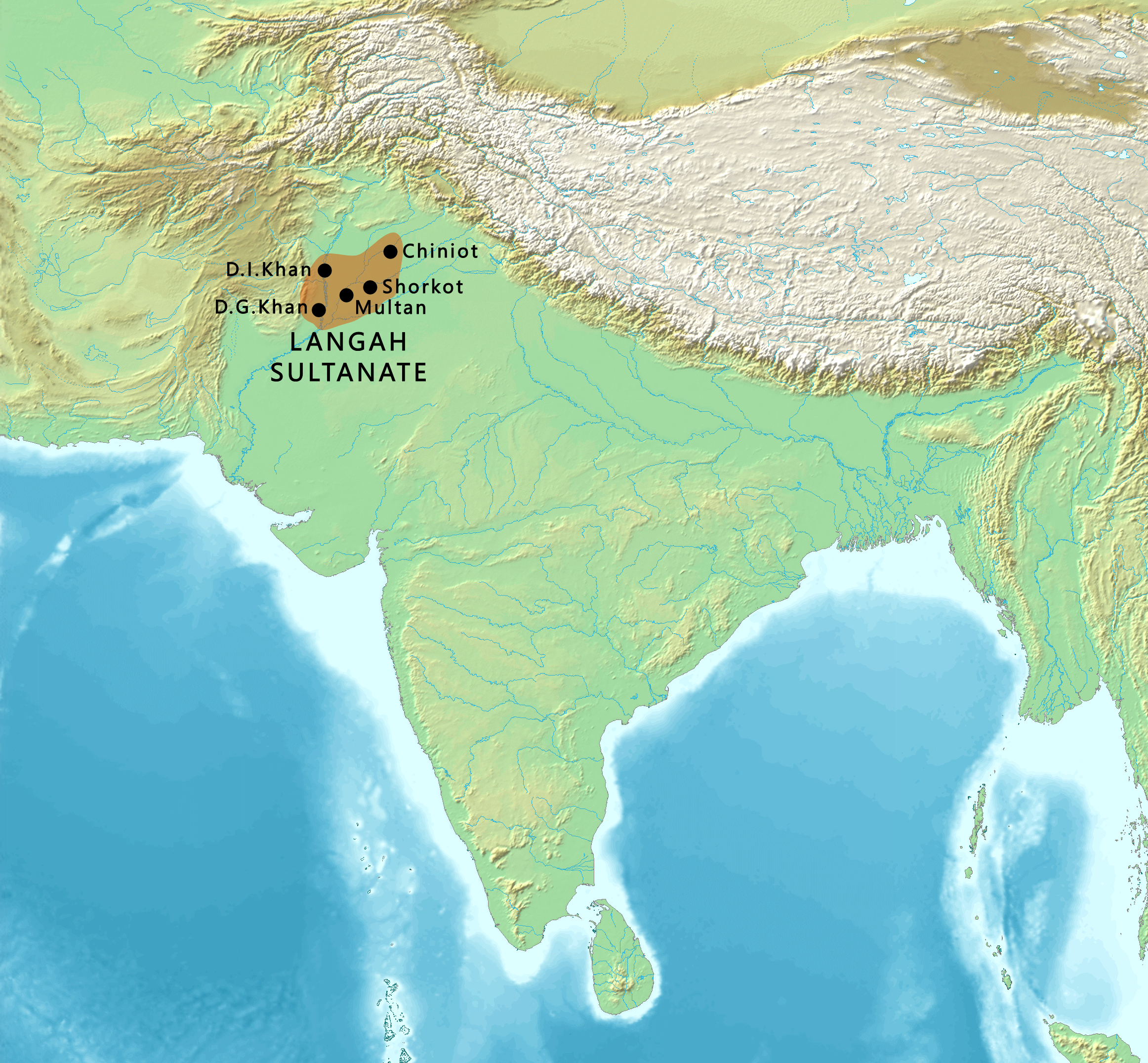
Approximate territory of the Langah Sultanate at its greatest extent, circa 1475 CE

In 1445, Sultan Qutbudin, the chief of Langah clan, established the Langah Sultanate in Multan. The reign of Sultan Husayn I who ruled from 1469 to 1498 is considered to most illustrious of the Langah Sultans. Multan experienced prosperity during this time, and a large number of Baloch settlers arrived in the city at the invitation of Shah Husayn. Shah Husayn successfully repulsed attempted invasion by the Delhi Sultans led by Tatar Khan and Barbak Shah. He fought off attempts to reinstall Shiekh Yousaf who had taken refuge under Delhi Sultans. Eventually, he signed a peace treaty with Sikander Lodhi and abducted in the favour of his son. His successor, Budhan Khan, who assumed the title Sultan Mahmud Shah I, inherited the Sultanate stretched encompassing the neighbouring regions, including the cities of Chiniot and Shorkot.

Sultan Husayn I being unable to hold his trans-Indus possessions, assigned the region around Dera Ismail Khan to Sardar Malik Sohrab Dodai Baloch in 1469 or 1471 and appointed him as "Jagir". The city was invaded during the reign of Sultan Husseyn II by ruler Shah Husayn of the Arghun dynasty, probably at Babur's insistence, who was either ethnic Mongol, or of Turkic or Turco-Mongol extraction. Multan fell in 1528 after an extended siege and Shah Husayn appointed his son Mirza Askari as governor of the city, assisted by Langar Khan, one of the powerful amirs of Sultan Mahmud Langah I. Shortly after Shah Husayn departed Multan for Thatta, however, the governor was thrown out of the city. The rebels under Sultan Mahmud II administered Multan for a time independently but in 1541, Sher Shah Suri captured Multan, and the Sultanate ended.

=== Founding of Sikhism ===
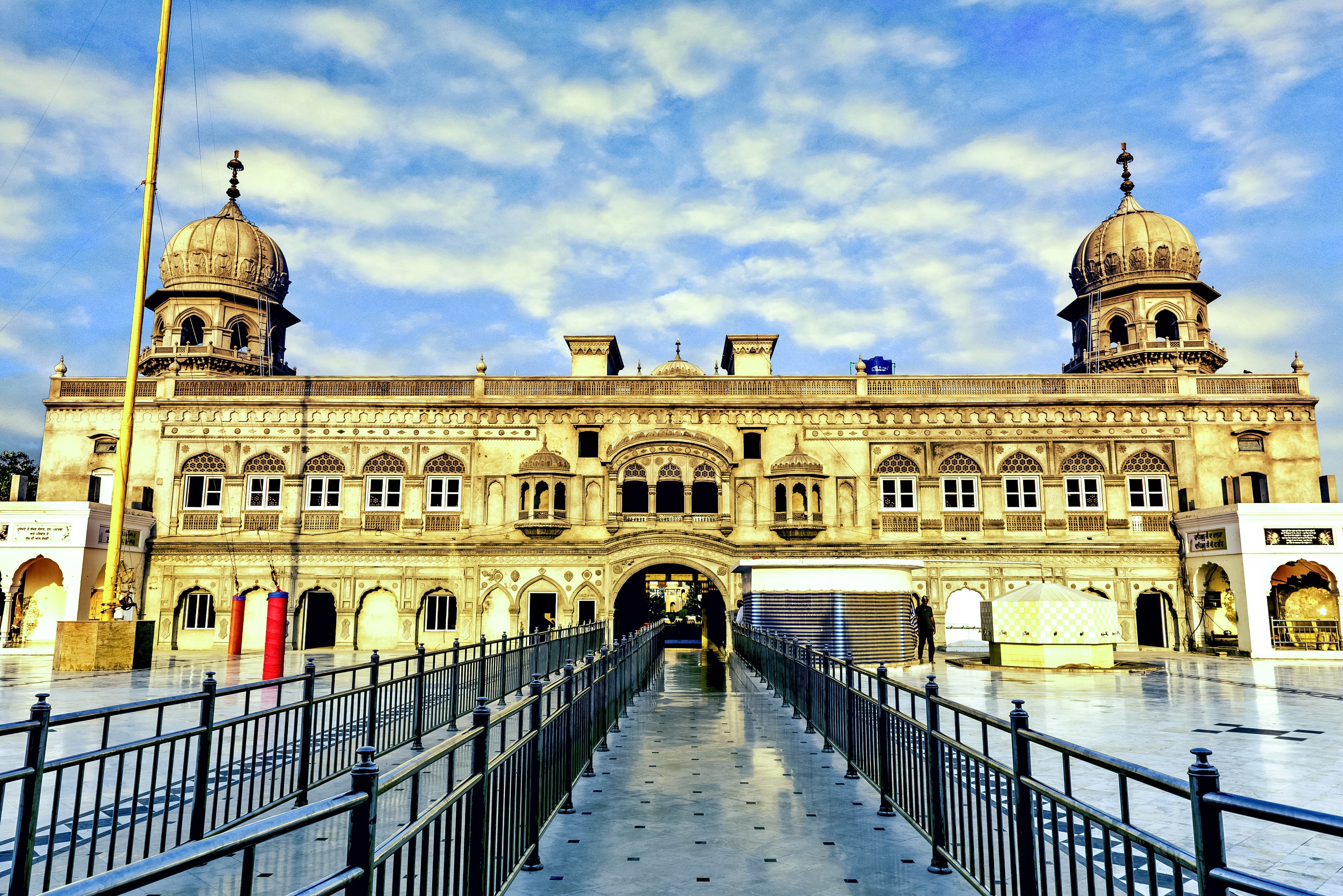
The Gurdwara Janam Asthan in Nankana Sahib, Pakistan, commemorates the site where Guru Nanak is believed to have been born.

A significant event in the late 15th century Punjab was the formation of Sikhism by Guru Nanak who was born in Nankana Sahib, Punjab, Pakistan in the Lahore province of the Delhi Sultanate. The history of the Sikh faith is closely associated with the history of Punjab and the socio-political situation in the northwest of the Indian subcontinent in the 17th century. The hymns composed by Guru Nanak were later collected in the Guru Granth Sahib, the central religious scripture of the Sikhs.

== Early Modern period (1526 AD – 1849 AD) ==
=== Mughal Empire ===
In 1526, Babur, a descendant of Timur and Genghis Khan from the Fergana Valley was ousted from his ancestral domain in Central Asia. Bābur turned to India and crossed the Khyber Pass. He was able to secure control of Punjab, and in 1526 he decisively defeated the forces of the Delhi sultan Ibrāhīm Lodī at the First Battle of Panipat. The next year, he defeated the Rajput confederacy under Rana Sanga of Mewar, and in 1529 defeated the remnants of the Delhi sultanates. At his death in 1530 the Mughal Empire encompassed almost all of Northern India.

Bābur's son Humāyūn (reigned 1530–40 and 1555–56) had lost territory to Sher Shah Suri, launched campaigns against the Gakkhars, about whom he suspected of being friendly with the Mughals. During this period, Sher Shah constructed the Rohtas Fort near Jhelum. Following the death of Sher Shah, in 1556, the Mughal forces under Humayun defeated Sikandar at the Battle of Panipat in 1556 and re-established the Mughal Empire across the Punjab and northern India. In 1580 the Punjab was divided into two provinces, Subah of Lahore and Subah of Multan. From 1586 to 1598, Lahore remained capital of the Mughal Empire.

Over the next twenty-four years, the Mughals gradually consolidated power in the Punjab. Campaigns followed to subdue local Zamindars and the Hill forts. The Gakkhars were co-opted and assimilated into the Mughal polity under Kamal Khan, son of Rai Sarang. Akbar (reigned 1556–1605) defeated Hemu at the Second Battle of Panipat (1556) and re-established Mughal rule. Akbar's son Jahangir had furthered the size of the Mughal Empire through conquest, yet left much of the state bankrupt as a result. He was later buried in Lahore. Jahangir's son Shah Jahan (reigned 1628–1658) was known for his monuments, including the Taj Mahal. He was born in Lahore. Saadullah Khan, born into the Thaheem tribe in Punjab from Chiniot remained Grand vizier (or Prime Minister) of the Mughal Empire in the period 1645 to 1656. Shah Jahan's son Aurangzeb was deeply religious and undertook extensive campaign in Deccan. He built famous Badshahi Mosque in Lahore. Aurangzeb had instilled heavy taxes on Hindus and Sikhs that had later led to an economic depression.

During the reign of Muḥammad Shah (1719–48), the empire began to decline, accelerated by warfare and rivalries, and. After the death of Muḥammad Shah in 1748, the Marathas attacked and ruled almost all of northern India. Mughal rule was reduced to only a small area around Delhi, which passed under Maratha (1785) and the British (1803) control. The last Mughal, Bahādur Shah II (reigned 1837–57), was exiled to Burma by the British. Muslims from Punjab who rose to nobility during the Mughal Era include Wazir Khan, Adina Beg Arain, and Shahbaz Khan Kamboh.

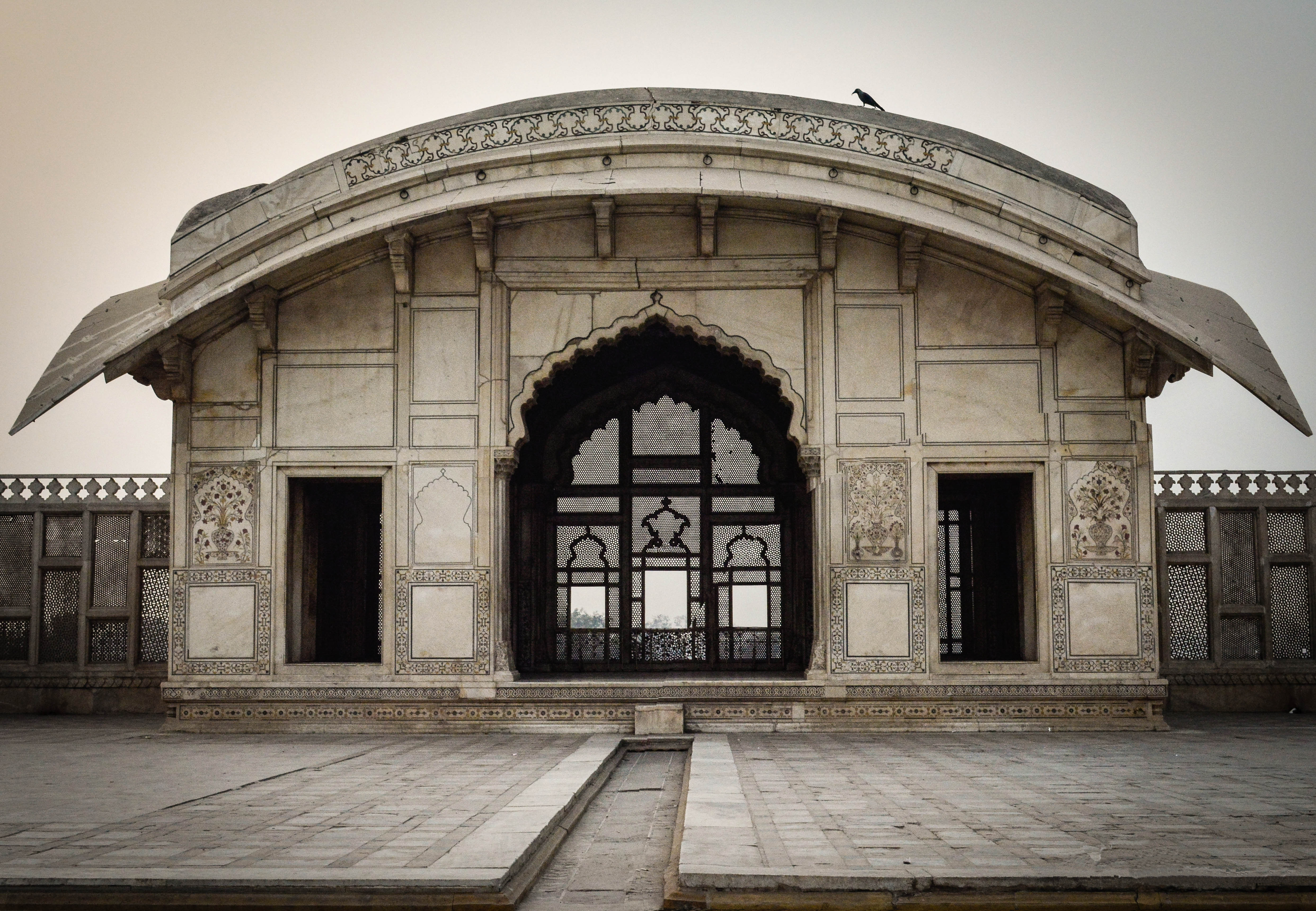
Naulakha pavilion (1633) in the Lahore Fort

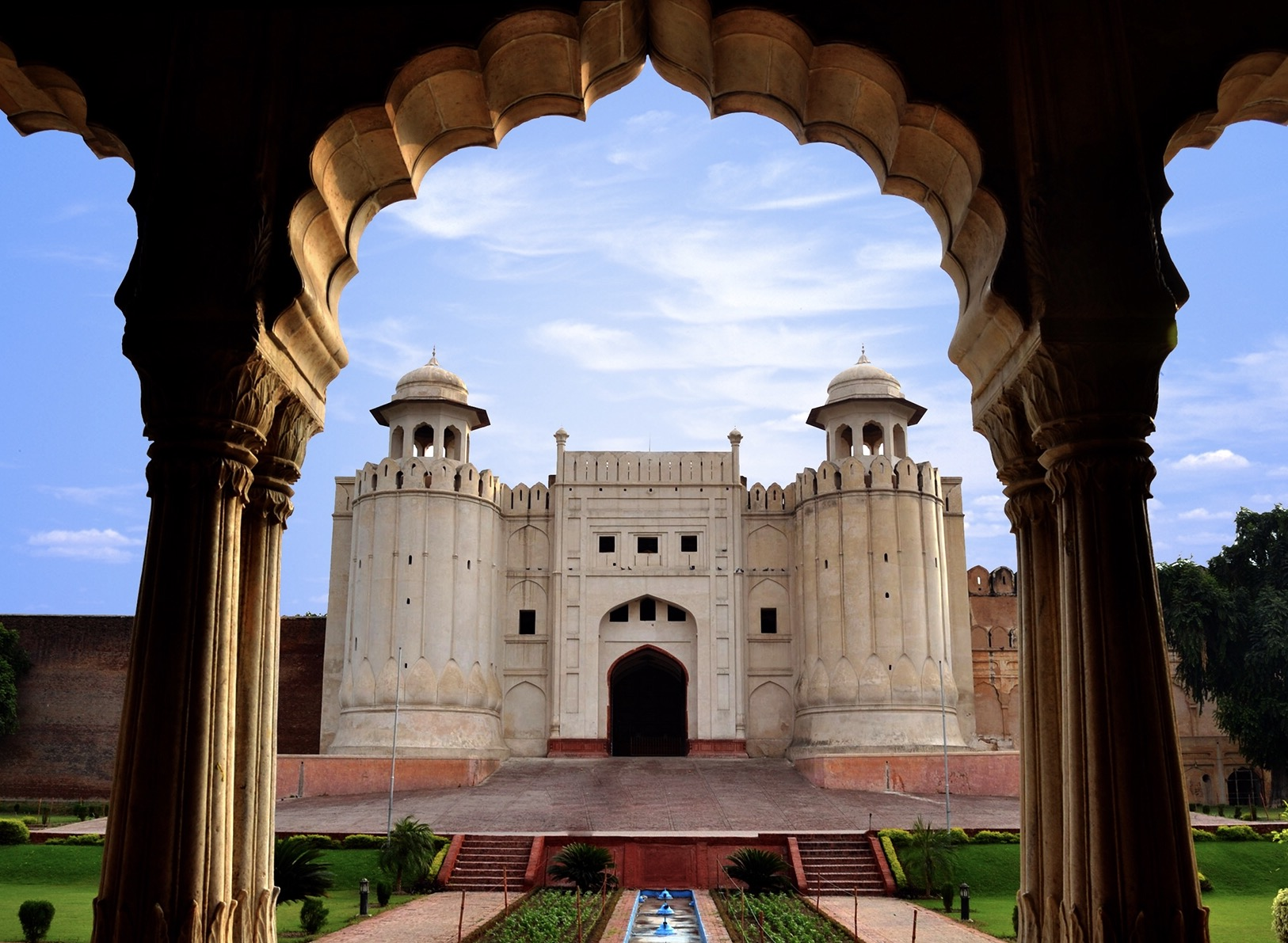
Alamgiri Gate of the Lahore Fort, a UNESCO World Heritage Site

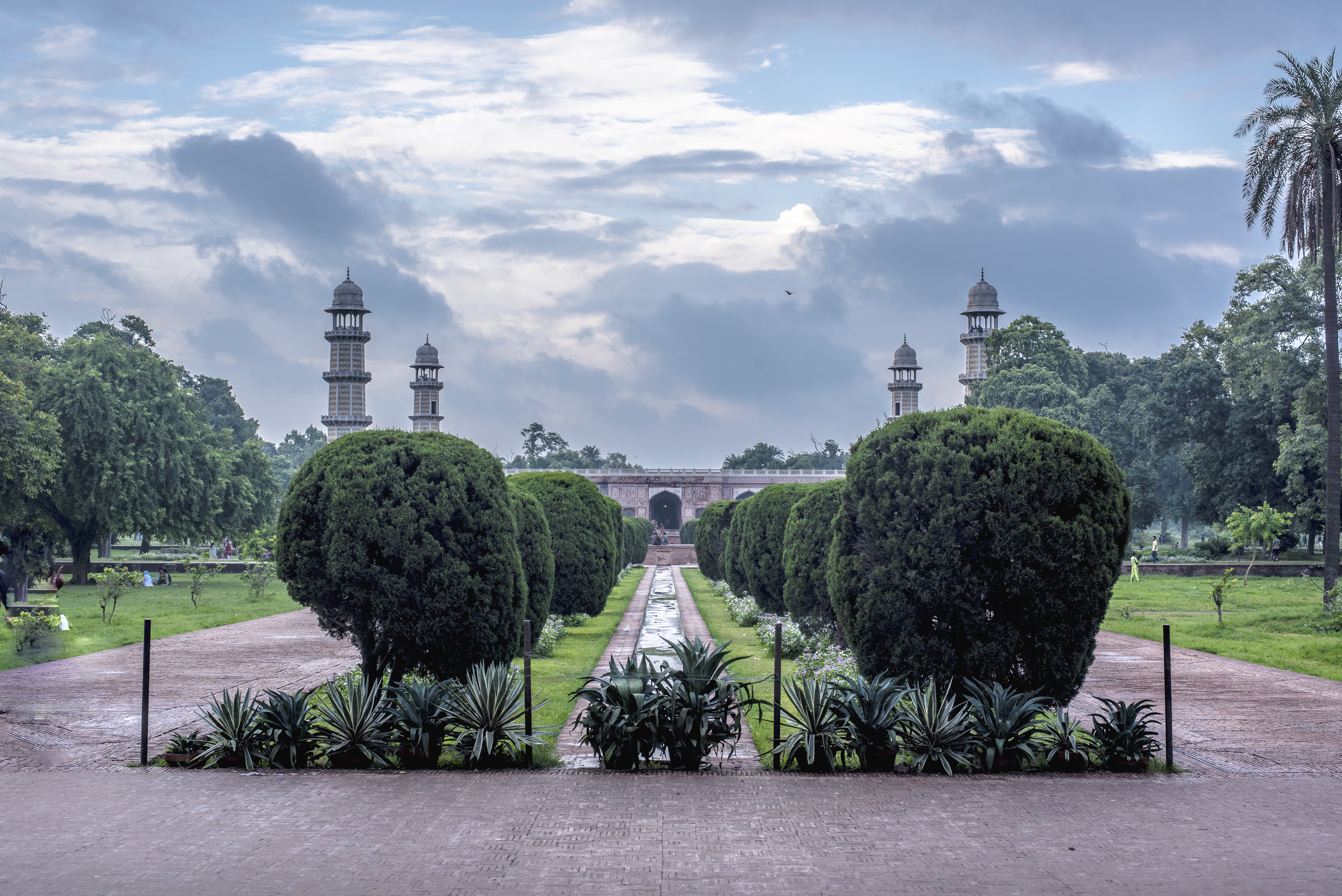
The Tomb of Jahangir in Lahore

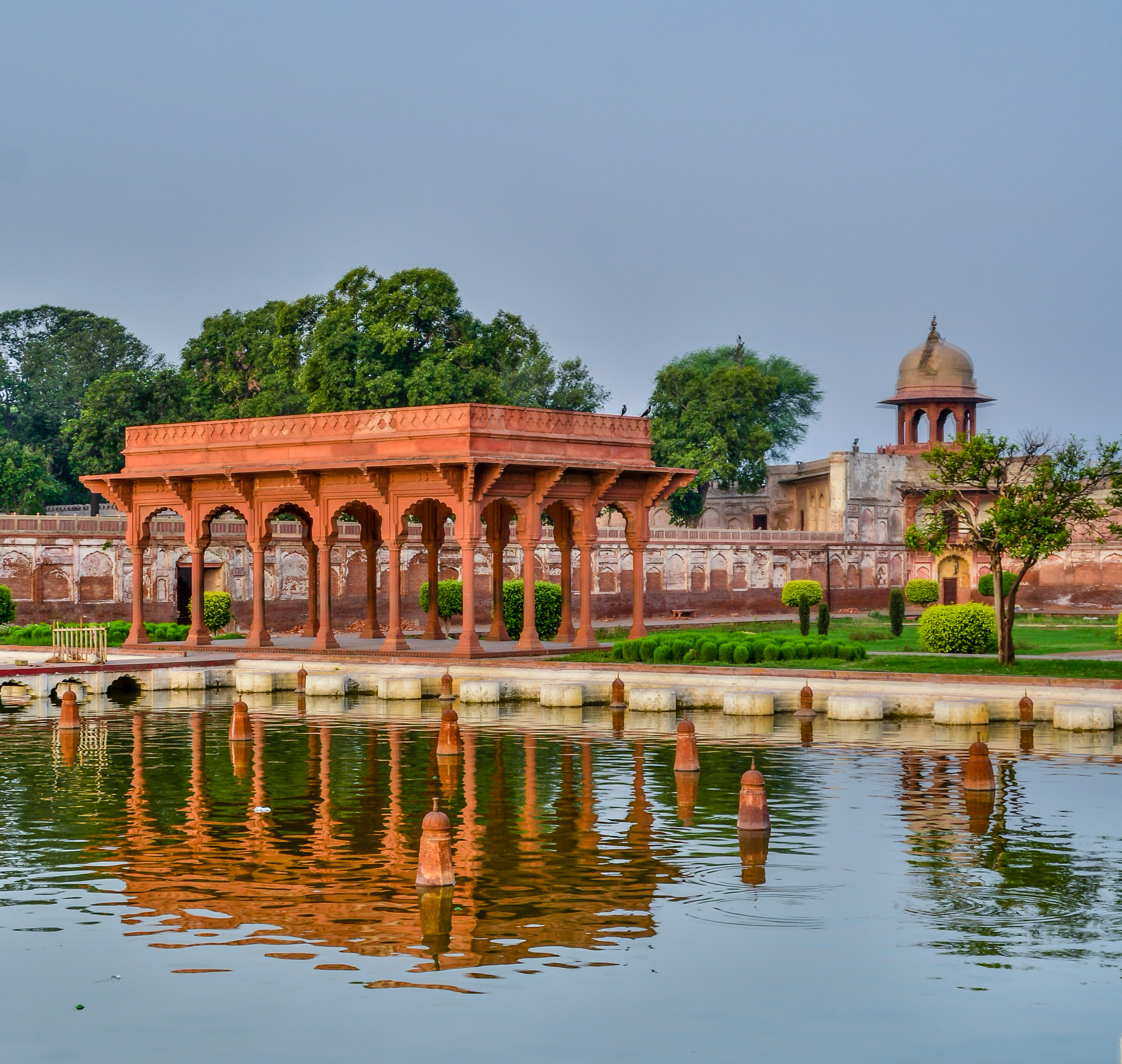
Shalimar Gardens, Lahore

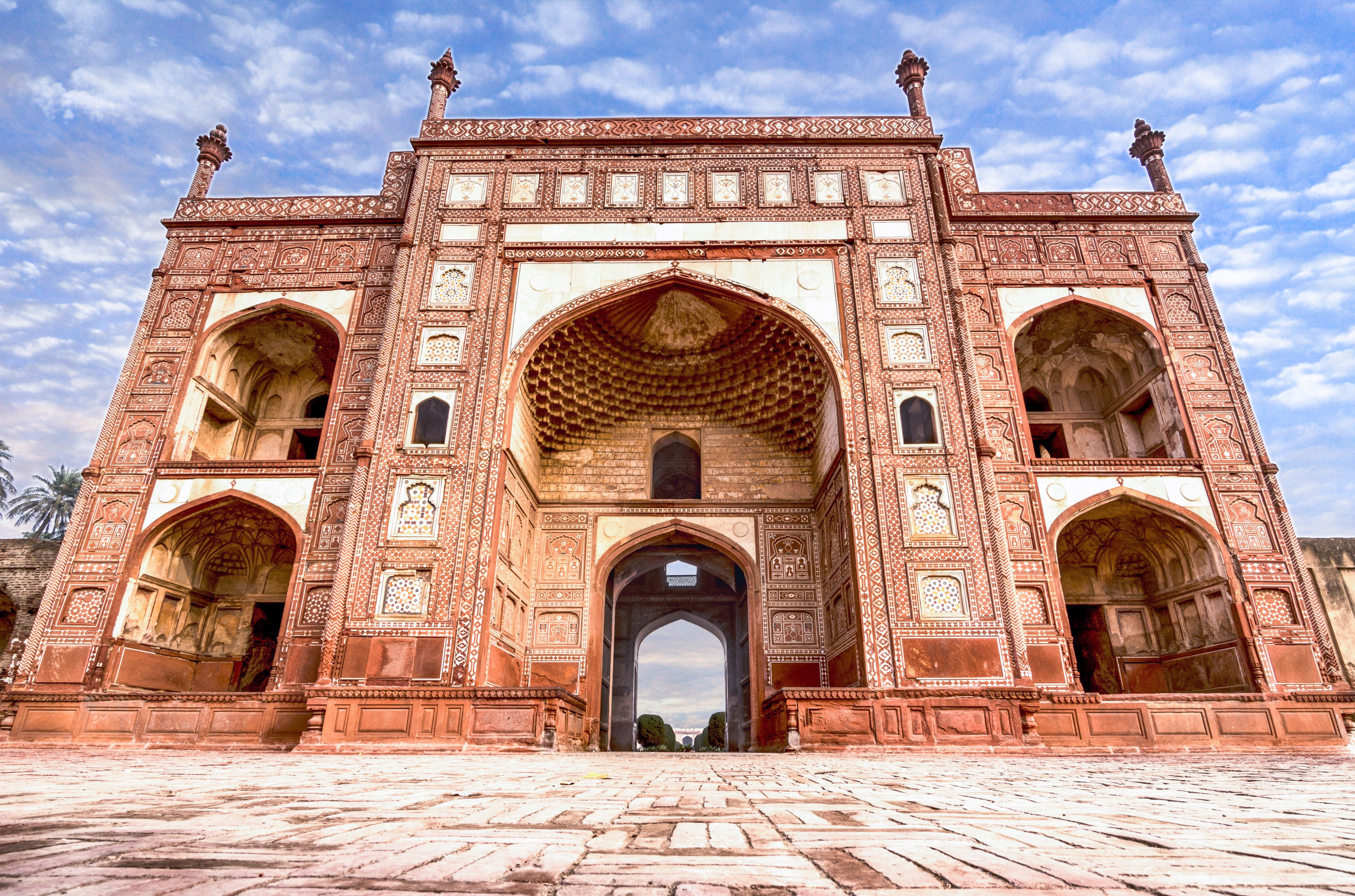
Akbari Sarai

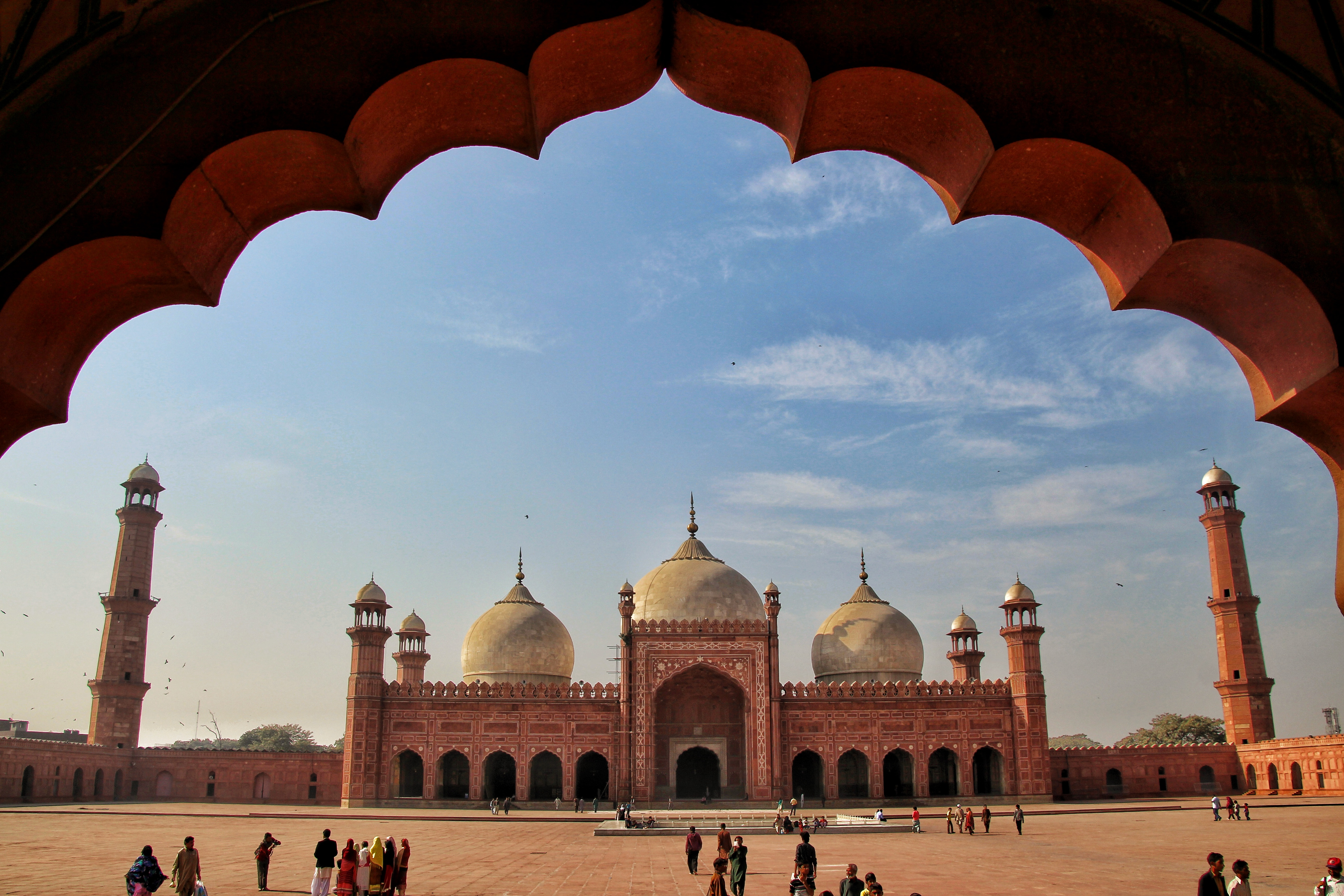
Badshahi Mosque

==== Mughal conflicts with Sikhs ====
The lifetime of Guru Nanak, the founder of Sikhism, coincided with the conquest of northern India by Babur and establishment of the Mughal Empire. Jahangir ordered the execution of Guru Arjan Dev, whilst in Mughal custody, for supporting his son Khusrau Mirza's rival claim to the throne. Guru Arjan Dev's death led to the sixth Guru Guru Hargobind to declare sovereignty in the creation of the Akal Takht and the establishment of a fort to defend Amritsar. Jahangir then jailed Guru Hargobind at Gwalior, but released him after a number of years when he no longer felt threatened. The succeeding son of Jahangir, Shah Jahan, took offence at Guru Hargobind's declaration and after a series of assaults on Amritsar, forced the Sikhs to retreat to the Sivalik Hills. The ninth Guru, Guru Tegh Bahadur, moved the Sikh community to Anandpur and travelled extensively to visit and preach in defiance of Aurangzeb, who attempted to install Ram Rai as new guru.

==== Durrani and Maratha invasions ====
In 1747, the Durrani Empire was established by Ahmad Shah Abdali with his crowning as King of the Afghans by a Pashtun tribal jirga. The first time Ahmad Shah invaded Punjab, the Mughal imperial army checked his advance successfully. Yet subsequent events led to a double alliance, one by marriage and another politically, between the Afghan King and the Mughal Emperor. The battle of Panipat was the effect of this political alliance. After the victory of Panipat, Ahmad Shah Durrani became the primary ruler over Northern India. The influence of Durrani monarch continued in Northern India up to his death.

In 1757, the Sikhs were persistently ambushing guards to loot trains. In order to send a message, and prevent such occurrences from recurring, Ahmad Shah destroyed the Golden Temple in Amritsar and filled the Sarovar (Holy water pool) with cow carcasses.

In 1758 the Maratha Empire's general Raghunathrao attacked and conquered northern and central Punjab up till Attock driving out Timur Shah Durrani, the son and viceroy of Ahmad Shah Abdali, in the process. Lahore, Multan, Kashmir and other provinces on the eastern side of Attock were under Maratha rule. In Punjab and Kashmir, the Marathas became major players. As Punjab served as the frontier province of the Marathas, Nana Saheb I gave the province to his key ally Adina Beg Khan who acquired the title of the Nawab of Punjab in 1758. In 1761, following the victory at the Third battle of Panipat between the Durrani and the Maratha Empire, Ahmad Shah Abdali captured remnants of the Maratha Empire in Punjab and Kashmir regions and had consolidated control over them.

In 1762, there were persistent conflicts with the Sikhs. Vadda Ghalughara took place under the Durrani rule to wipe out the Sikhs, with 30,000 Sikhs being killed, an offensive that had begun with the Mughals, with the Chhota Ghallughara, and lasted several decades under its successor states. The rebuilt Golden Temple was destroyed, and the pool was filled with cow entrails, again.

==== Pakpattan state (1692–1810 CE) ====
Following the disintegration of the Mughal Empire, the shrine's Dīwān was able to forge a political independent state centered on Pakpattan. In 1757, Dīwān 'Abd as-Subḥān gathered an army of his Jat murīds, attacked the Raja of Bikaner, and thereby expanded the shrine's territorial holdings for the first time east of the Sutlej. Around 1776, the Dīwān, supported mainly by his Wattu murīds, successfully repelled an attack by the Sikh Nakai Misl, resulting in the death of the Nakai leader, Heera Singh Sandhu.

==== Sial State (1723 - 1816) ====
Sial state was established by the 13 Sial Chief Nawab Walidad Khan Sial in 1723. He gradually gained control of the lower Rachna doab, including the cities of Chiniot, Pindi Bhattian, Jhang and Mankera.

Next chief, Inayatullah Khan (r. 1747– 1787) was a successful general who won 22 battles against Bhangi Misl and the Multan chiefs.

Sikh Empire invaded Jhang multiple times from 1801 to 1816. Sial state was annexed by Sikh Empire and Ahmad Khan Sial was awarded a Jagir by Ranjit Singh.

=== Sikh Empire ===
==== Punjabi Unification ====
In 1799, a process to unify Punjab was initiated by Ranjit Singh. Training his army under the style of the East India Company, he was able to conquer much of Punjab and surrounding areas. The invasions of Zaman Shah, the second successor of Ahmad Shah Durrani had served as a catalyst, for various Punjabi states to accede. After the first invasion, Singh had recovered his own fort at Rohtas. During the second invasion, he had emerged as a leading Sikh chief. After the third invasion, he had decisively defeated Zamah Shah. This had eventually led to the takeover of Lahore in 1799, officially forming the Sikh Empire. In 1809, Singh signed the Treaty of Amritsar with the British; in this treaty, Singh was recognised as the sole ruler of Punjab up to River Sutlej by the British.

Within ten years of Ranjit Singh's death in 1839, the Empire was taken over by the British who had already more or less exerted indirect or direct influence throughout the Subcontinent. At Lahore, there were increasing levels of nobles vying for power. A growing instability, allowed the British to come in and take over control of the area. After the British victories at the battles of the Sutlej in 1845–46, the army and territory of the boy Raja Duleep Singh was cut down. Lahore was garrisoned by British troops, and given a resident in the Durbar. In 1849, the British had formally taken control.

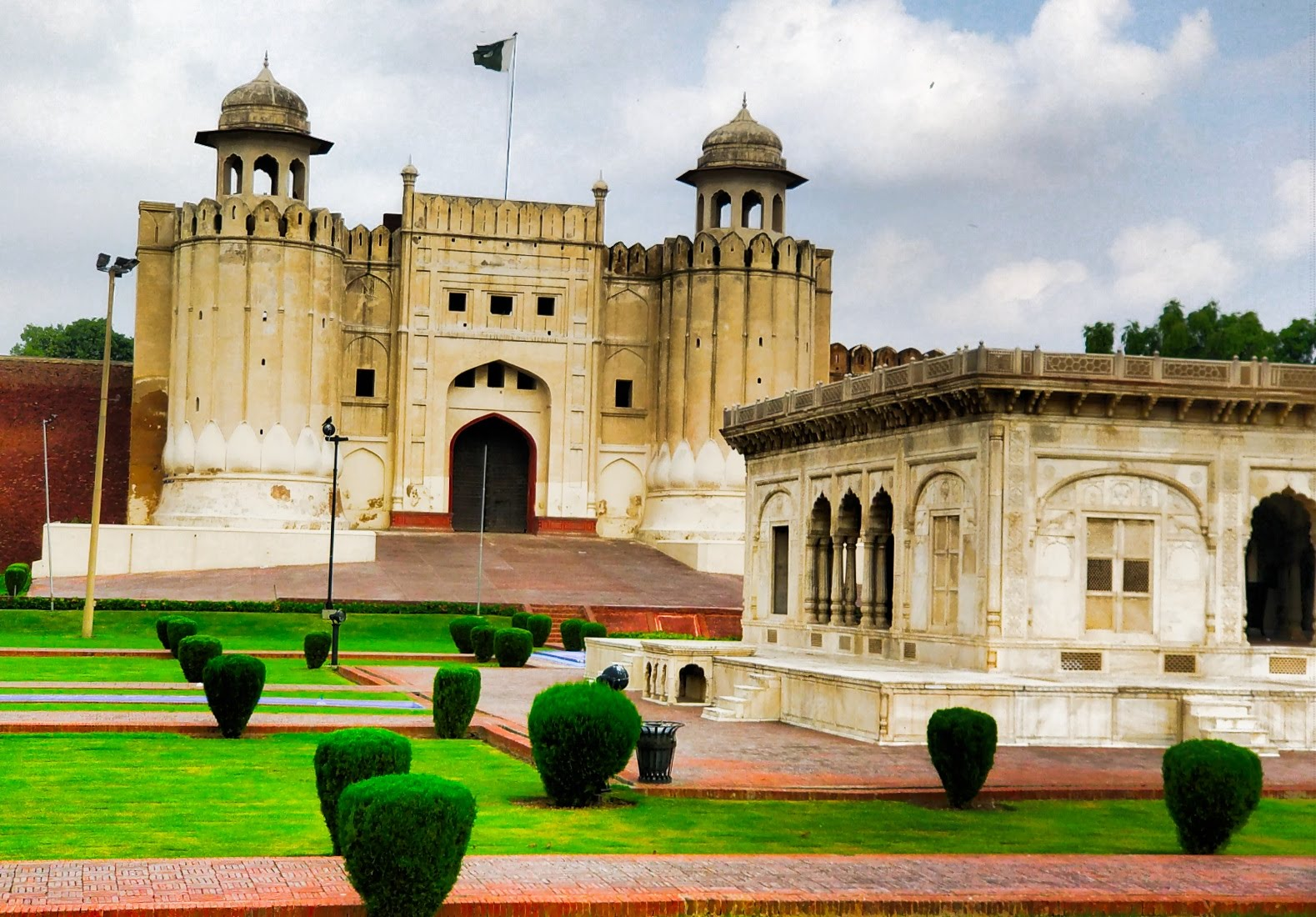
Hazuri Bagh Baradari in front of the Alamgiri gate. It was built by Ranjit Singh in 1818 to celebrate his capture of the Koh-i-Noor diamond from Shuja Shah Durrani in 1813.

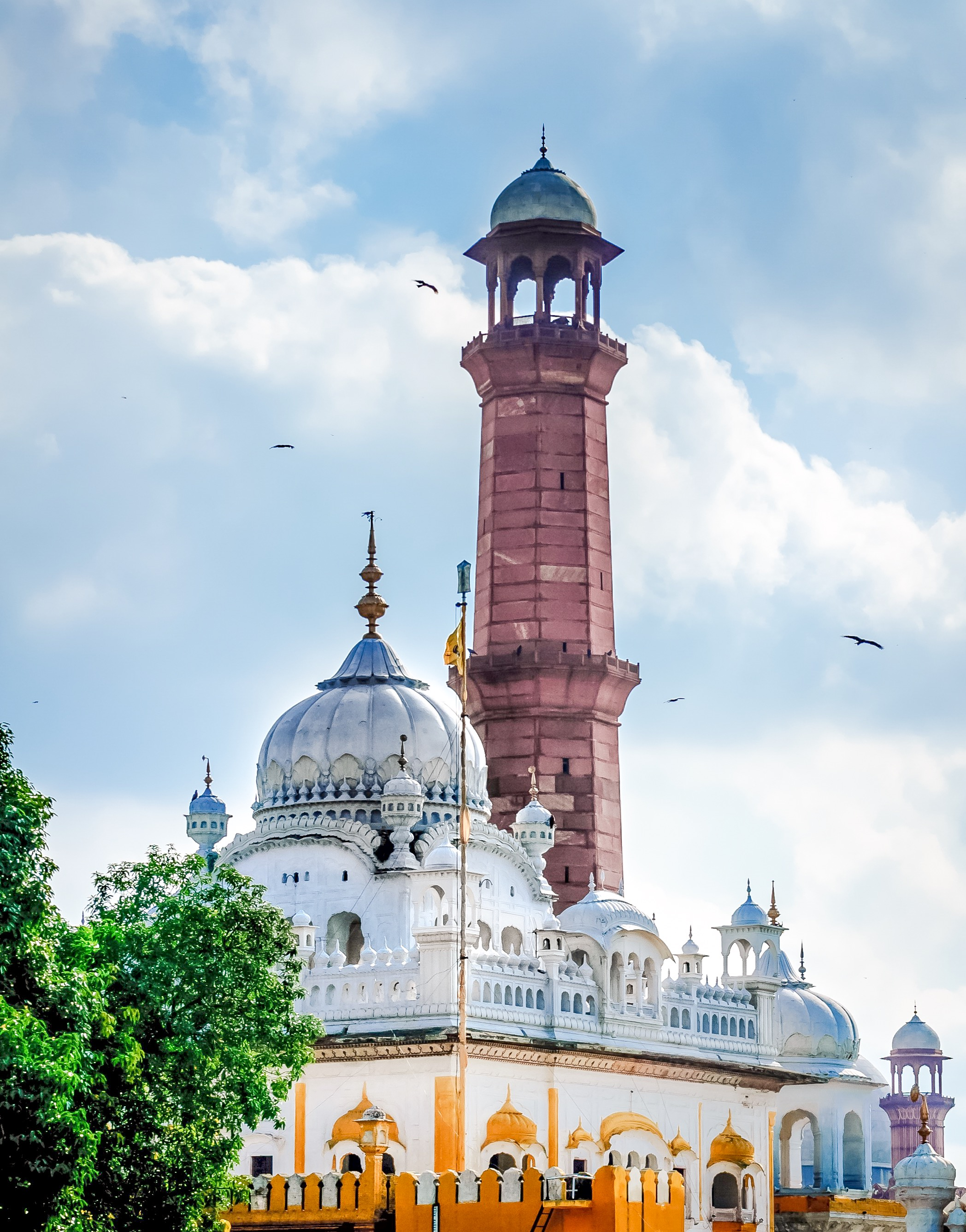
The Samadhi of Ranjit Singh is located in Lahore, Pakistan, adjacent to the Badshahi Mosque

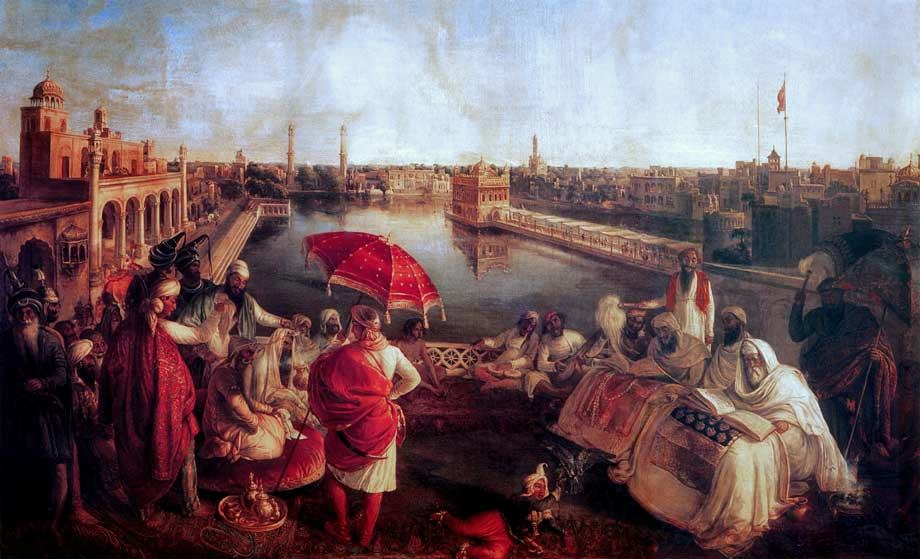
Maharaja Ranjit Singh listening to Guru Granth Sahib being recited near the Akal Takht and Golden Temple, Amritsar. Painting by August Schoefft (1850)

=== Kingdom of Bahawalpur ===
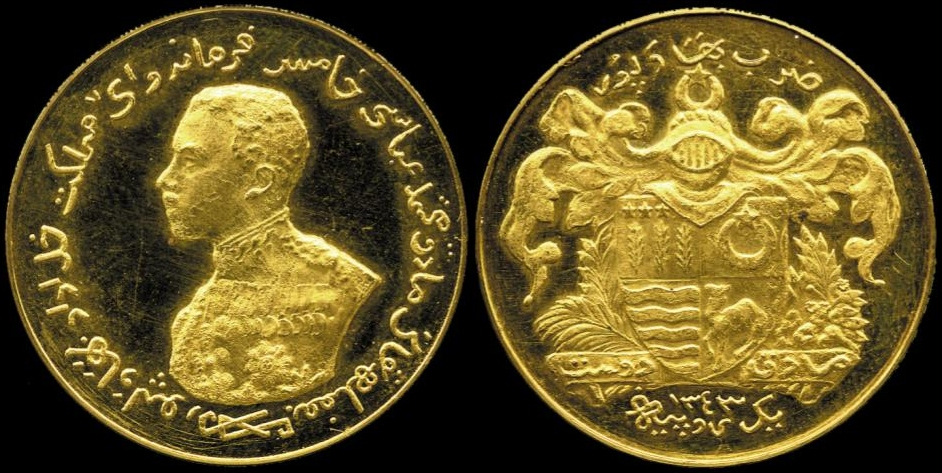
One Rupee gold coin of Sadeq Mohammad Khan V

The Bahawalpur state was founded in 1609 AD by Nawab Bahawal Khan Abbasi. The role of Bahawalpur state was important as the sole surviving Muslim state in Punjab. On 22 February 1833, Abbasi III entered into a subsidiary alliance with the British, to get protection against the expanding Sikh Empire. When British rule ended in 1947 and British India was partitioned into India and Pakistan, Bahawalpur joined the Dominion of Pakistan. Bahawalpur remained an autonomous entity until 14 October 1955, when it was merged with the province of West Pakistan.

== Colonial period (1849 AD – 1947 AD) ==
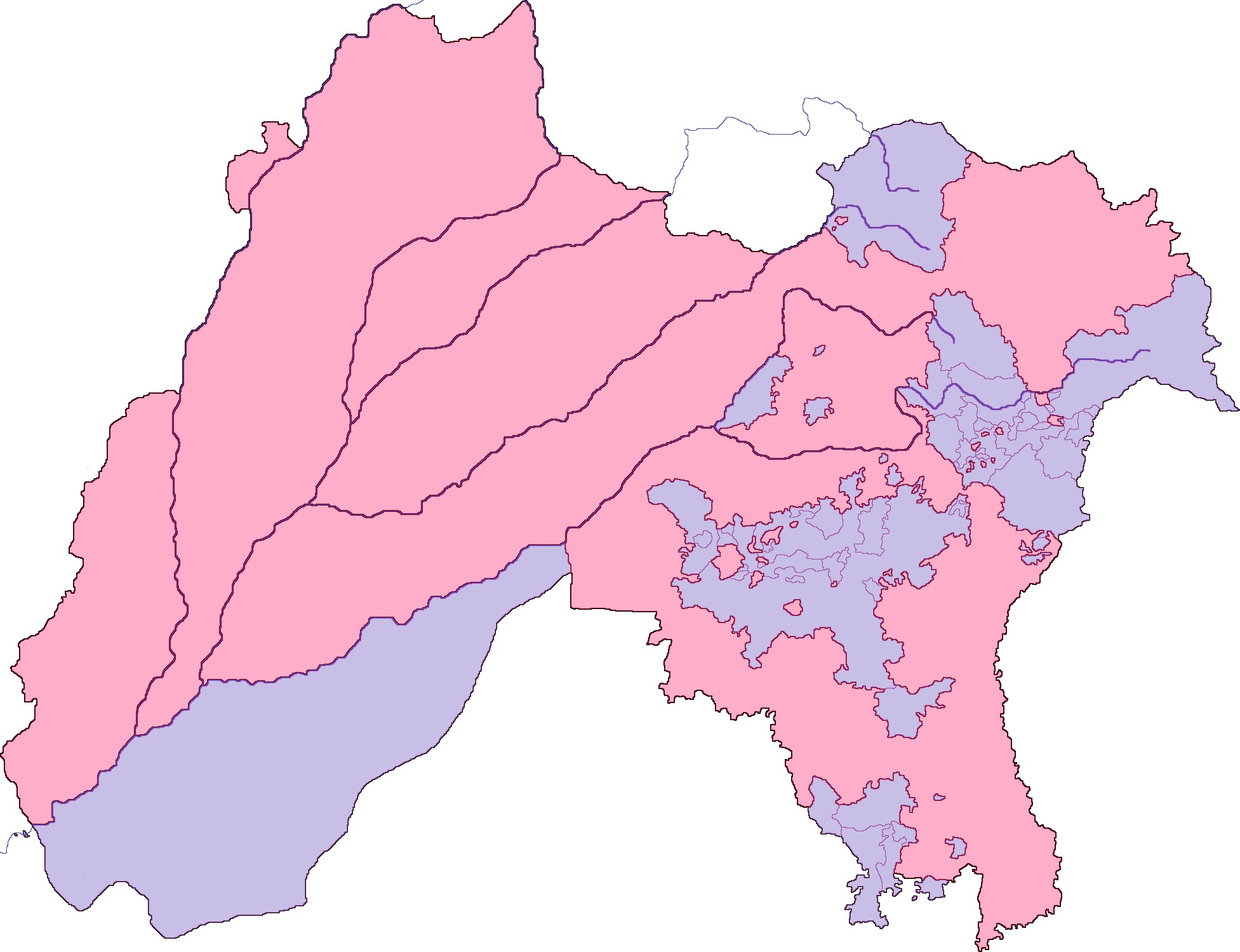
Map of the Punjab Province in 1947. Purple showing princely states, red showing direct British rule.

The Punjab was annexed by the East India Company in 1849. Although nominally part of the Bengal Presidency it was administratively independent. During the Indian Rebellion of 1857, apart from Revolt led by Ahmed Khan Kharal and Murree rebellion of 1857, the Punjab remained relatively peaceful. In 1858, under the terms of the Queen's Proclamation issued by Queen Victoria, the Punjab came under the direct rule of Britain.

Colonial rule had a profound impact on all areas of Punjabi life. Economically it transformed the Punjab into the richest farming area of India, socially it sustained the power of large landowners and politically it encouraged cross-communal co-operation amongst land owning groups. The Punjab also became the major centre of recruitment into the Indian Army. By patronising influential local allies and focusing administrative, economic and constitutional policies on the rural population, the British ensured the loyalty of its large rural population.

Administratively, colonial rule instated a system of bureaucracy and measure of the law. The 'paternal' system of the ruling elite was replaced by 'machine rule' with a system of laws, codes, and procedures. For purposes of control, the British established new forms of communication and transportation, including post systems, railways, roads, and telegraphs. The creation of Canal Colonies in western Punjab between 1860 and 1947 brought 14 million acres of land under cultivation, and revolutionised agricultural practices in the region. To the agrarian and commercial class was added a professional middle class that had risen the social ladder through the use of the English education, which opened up new professions in law, government, and medicine.

Despite these developments, colonial rule was marked by exploitation of resources. For the purpose of exports, the majority of external trade was controlled by British export banks. The Imperial government exercised control over the finances of Punjab and took the majority of the income for itself.

=== Religious revivalism ===
A highlight of religious controversy during this time was that of the Ahmaddiya movement, initiated by Mirza Ghulam Ahmad. In his Burahin-i-Ahmaddiya, which was meant to rejuvenate Islam on the basis of the Quran, he had attempted to refute both Christian missionaries, and Hindus and Sikhs. In another work, Ahmad argued that Guru Nanak was a Muslim. He interpreted Jihad as a peaceful method, and declared himself to be the Messiah. This was met with significant controversy.

In the first and second decades of the early 20th century, the idea of Hindu and Muslim separation had become an active political tone. Muslims were told to remain aloof of the Indian National Congress, the main body seeking Indian Independence, because there was a general fear that representation based on elections and employment-based upon competition was not in their interest. The All-India Muslim League's demand for separate electorates for Muslims was granted at Amritsar in 1909. The Muslim League also demanded separate electorates in every province, even in those without Muslim majority populations, which was also granted by the Indian National Congress in 1916.

=== Railways ===
In 1862, the first section of railway in the Punjab was constructed between Lahore and Amritsar, and Lahore Junction railway station opened. Lines were opened between Lahore and Multan in 1864, and Amritsar and Delhi in 1870. The Scinde, Punjab and Delhi railways merged to form the Scinde, Punjab & Delhi Railway in 1870, creating a link between Karachi and Lahore via Multan. The Punjab Northern State Railway linked Lahore and Peshawar in 1883. By 1886, the independent railways had amalgamated into North Western State Railway.

=== Education ===
In 1854, the Punjab education department was instituted with a policy to provide secular education in all government managed institutions. Privately run institutions would only receive grants-in-aid in return for providing secular instruction. By 1864 this had resulted in a situation whereby all grants-in-aid to higher education schools and colleges were received by institutions under European management, and no indigenous owned schools received government help. In 1882, University of Punjab was established in Lahore, the 4th university to be established in South Asia. In 1884, a reorganisation of the Punjab education system occurred, introducing measures tending towards decentralisation of control over education and the promotion of an indigenous education agency. As a consequence several new institutions were encouraged in the province. The Arya Samaj opened a college in Lahore in 1886, the Sikhs opened the Khalsa College whilst the Anjuman-i-Himayat-i-Islam stepped in to organise Muslim education.

=== Unrest ===
An important event of the British Raj in Punjab was the Jallianwala Bagh massacre. In 1919, Brigadier-General Reginald Dyer led fifty riflemen from the 1/9th Gurkhas, 54th Sikhs, and 59th Sikhs into the Bagh and ordered them to open fire into the crowd that had gathered there. The official number of deaths, as reported by the British government, was given as 379 killed, but some reports claimed that more than 1,000 were killed. There had been many Indian independence movements in Punjab at the time as well. Notably, the actions of Bhagat Singh, Sukhdev, and Rajguru on 17 December 1928 in which the trio was responsible for killing J.P. Saunders in revenge for the latter's killing of Lala Lajpat Rai. They were also responsible for the bombing of the Legislative Assembly in Delhi on 8 April 1929. The three believed that the nonviolent movement was a failure. Nevertheless, the use of violence in the Indian independence movement became unpopular after the execution of the trio on 23 March 1931.

=== Politics ===
Punjab Legislative Council was established by colonial authorities under Government of India Act 1919. The Government of India Act 1935 introduced increased provincial autonomy to Punjab replacing the system of dyarchy. It provided for the constitution of Punjab Legislative Assembly of 175 members presided by a Speaker and an executive government responsible to the Assembly. The Unionist Party under Sir Sikandar Hayat Khan formed the government in 1937. Sir Sikandar was succeeded by Malik Khizar Hayat Tiwana in 1942 who remained the Premier of the Punjab till partition in 1947. The Unionist Party dominated Punjabi politics from the 1920s until the Second World War. Its influence over the rural population severely limited the local appeal and reach of both the Indian National Congress and Muslim League. A strong supporter of colonial rule, the Unionists were weakened by the war as they were directed to sacrifice their political interests to support the war effort. Unable to placate their traditional support base with benefits from the colonial administration, they suffered a loss of authority which led to their disastrous performance at the 1946 Punjab Provincial Assembly election and a breakdown in inter-communal cooperation at a political level. Although the term of the Assembly was five years, the Assembly continued for about eight years and its last sitting was held on 19 March 1945.

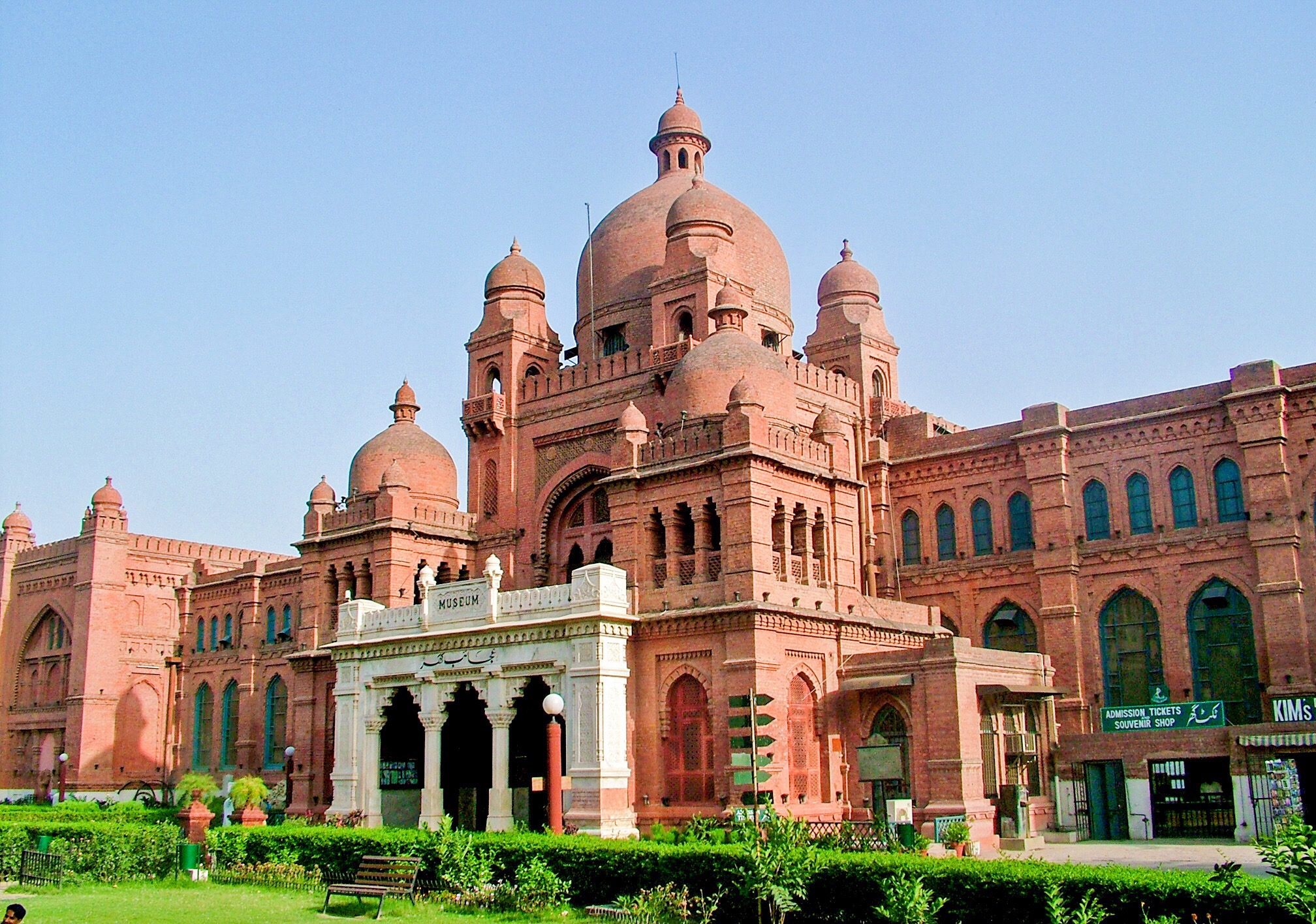
Lahore Museum in Lahore. It was built in 1865.

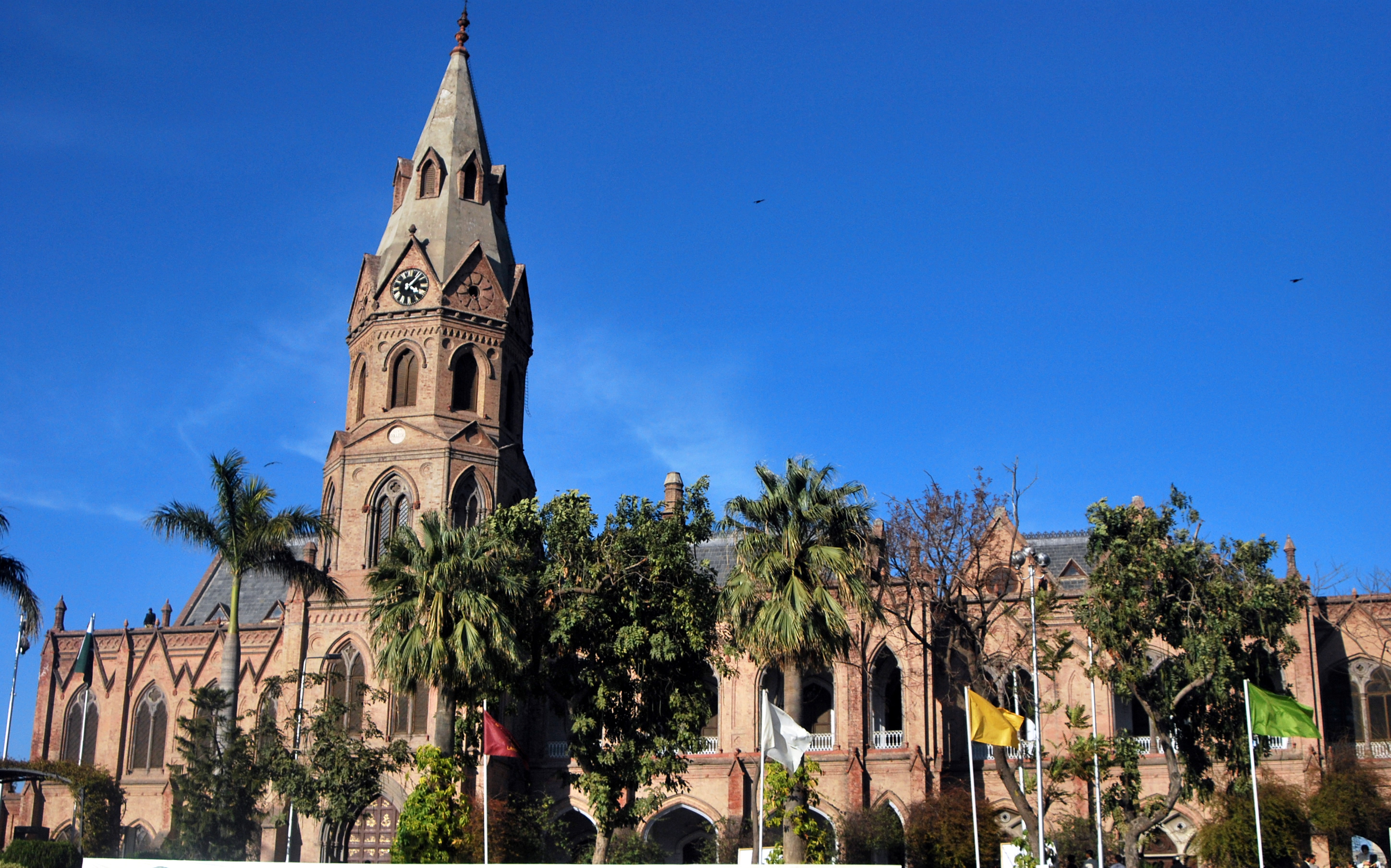
Government College, Lahore, established in 1864.

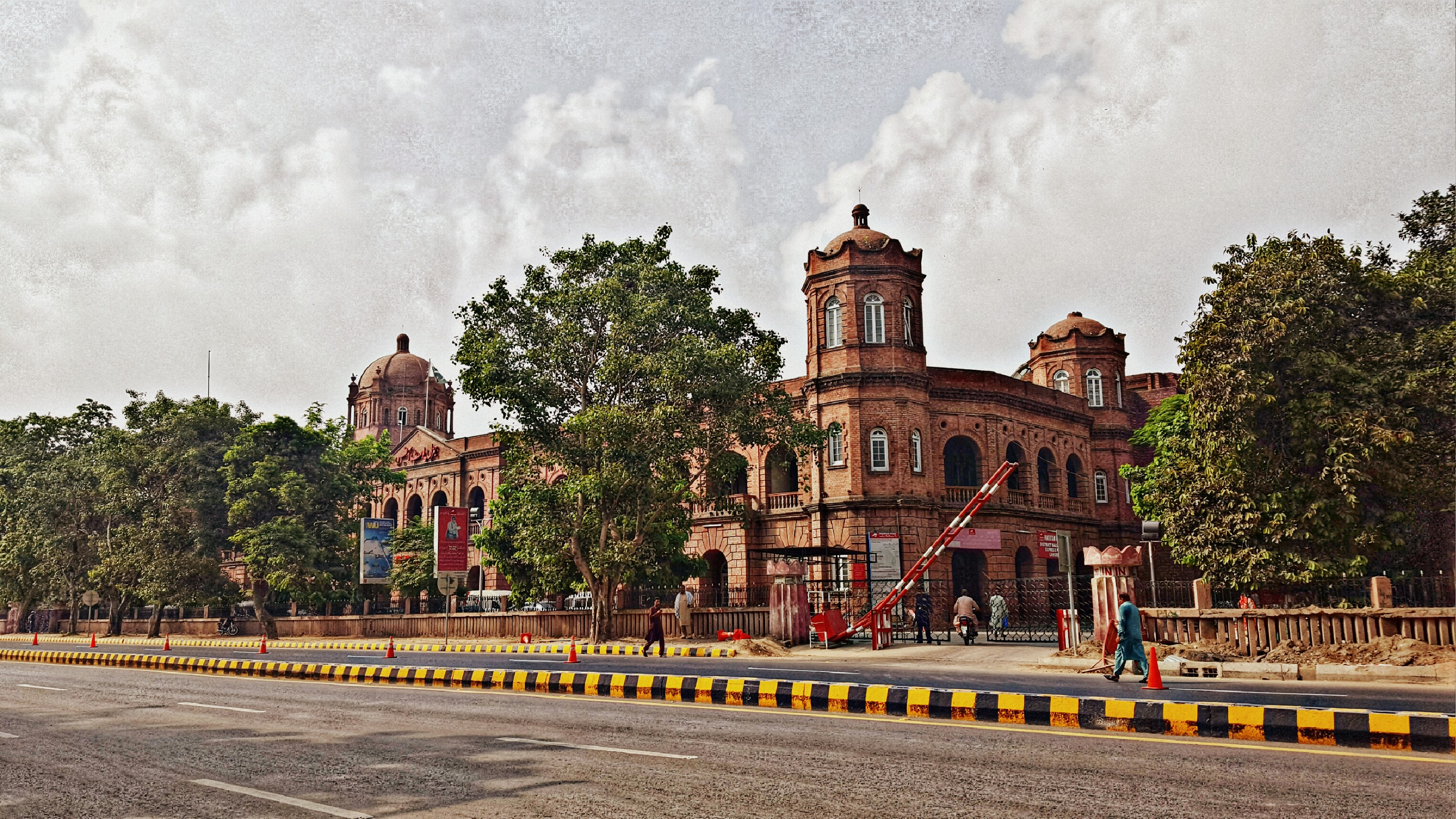
General Post Office, Lahore, built in 1887.

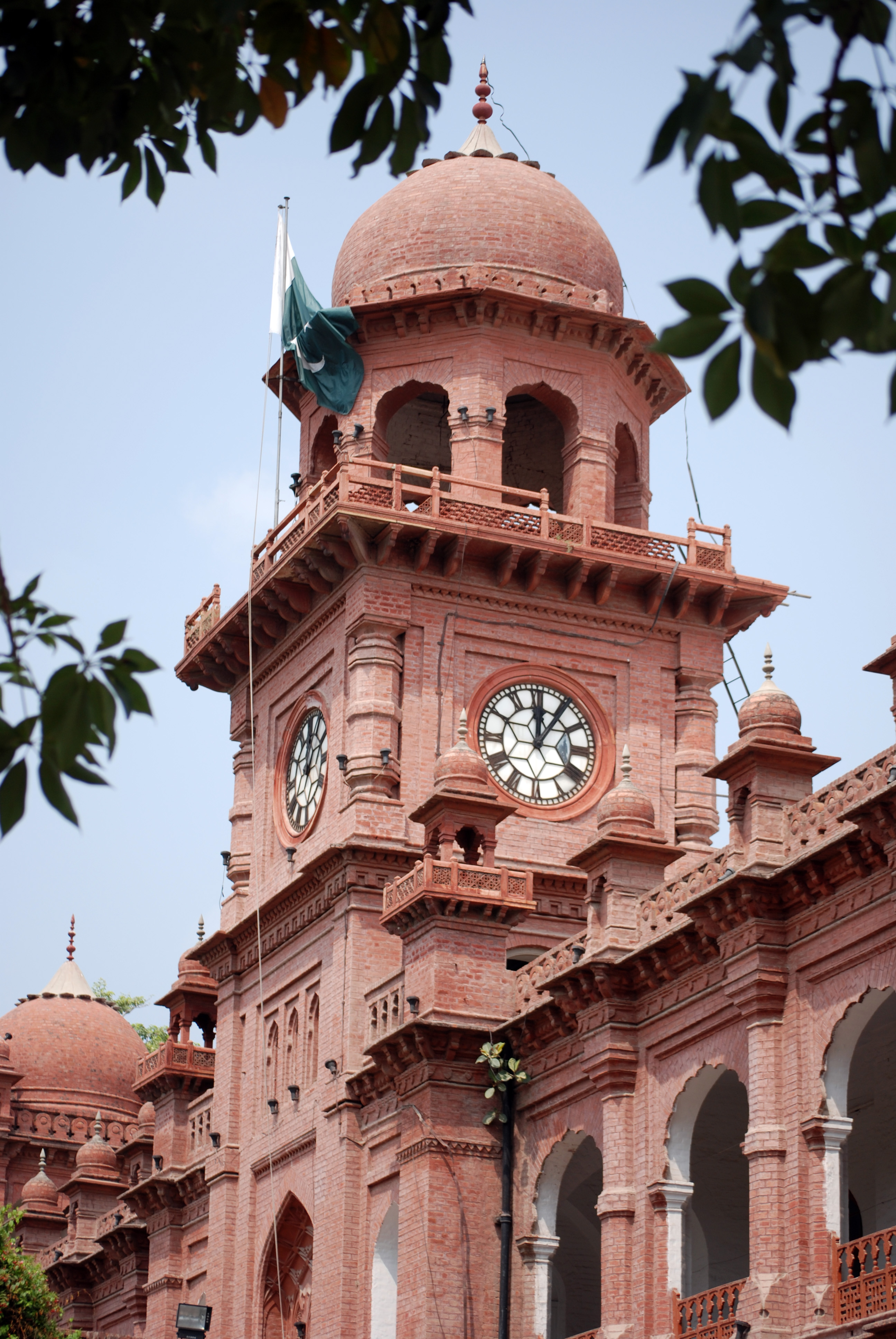
University of the Punjab, built in 1882. It was the fourth university established in the Indian subcontinent.

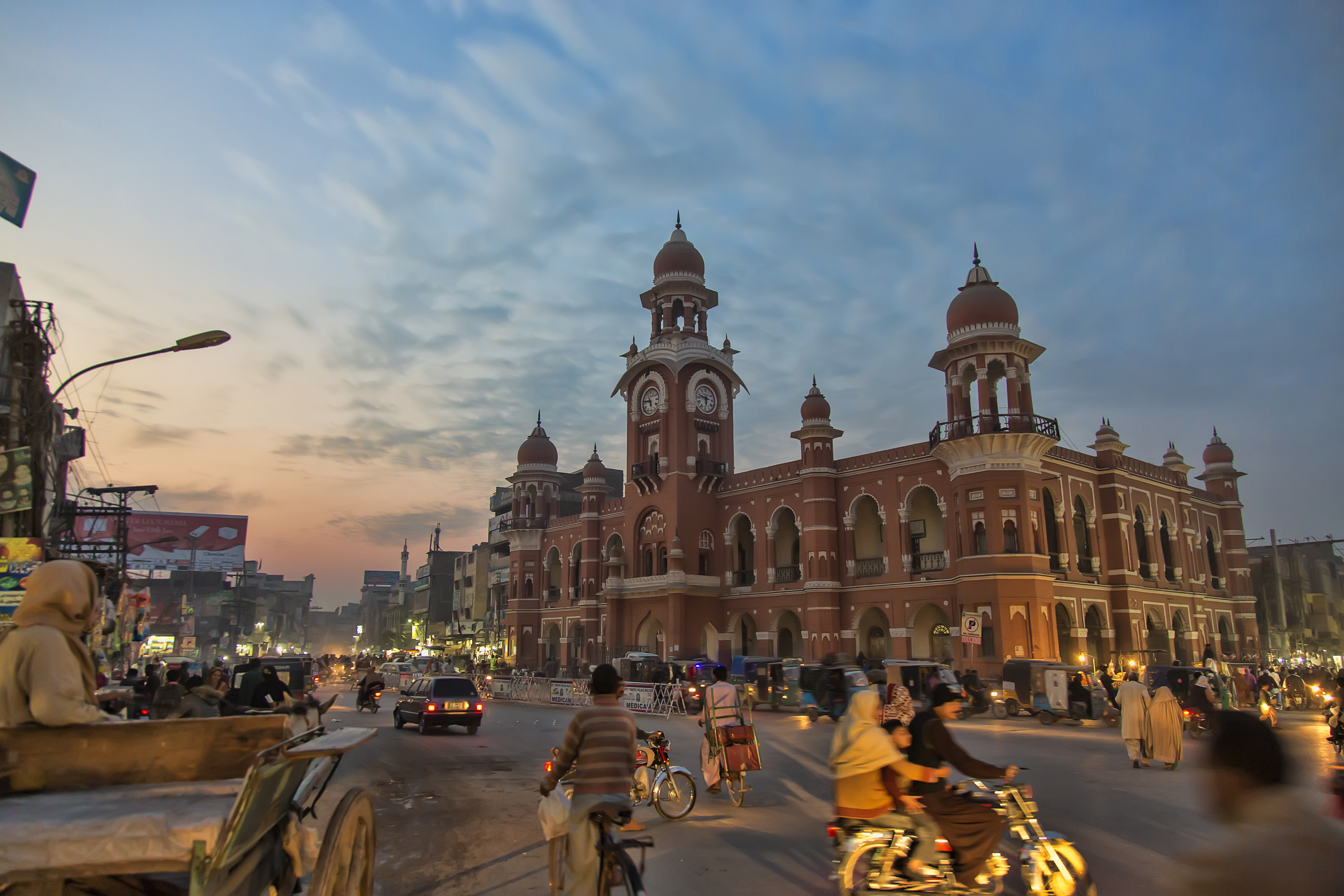
Multan Ghanta Ghar was built in the Indo-Saracenic style, in 1884.

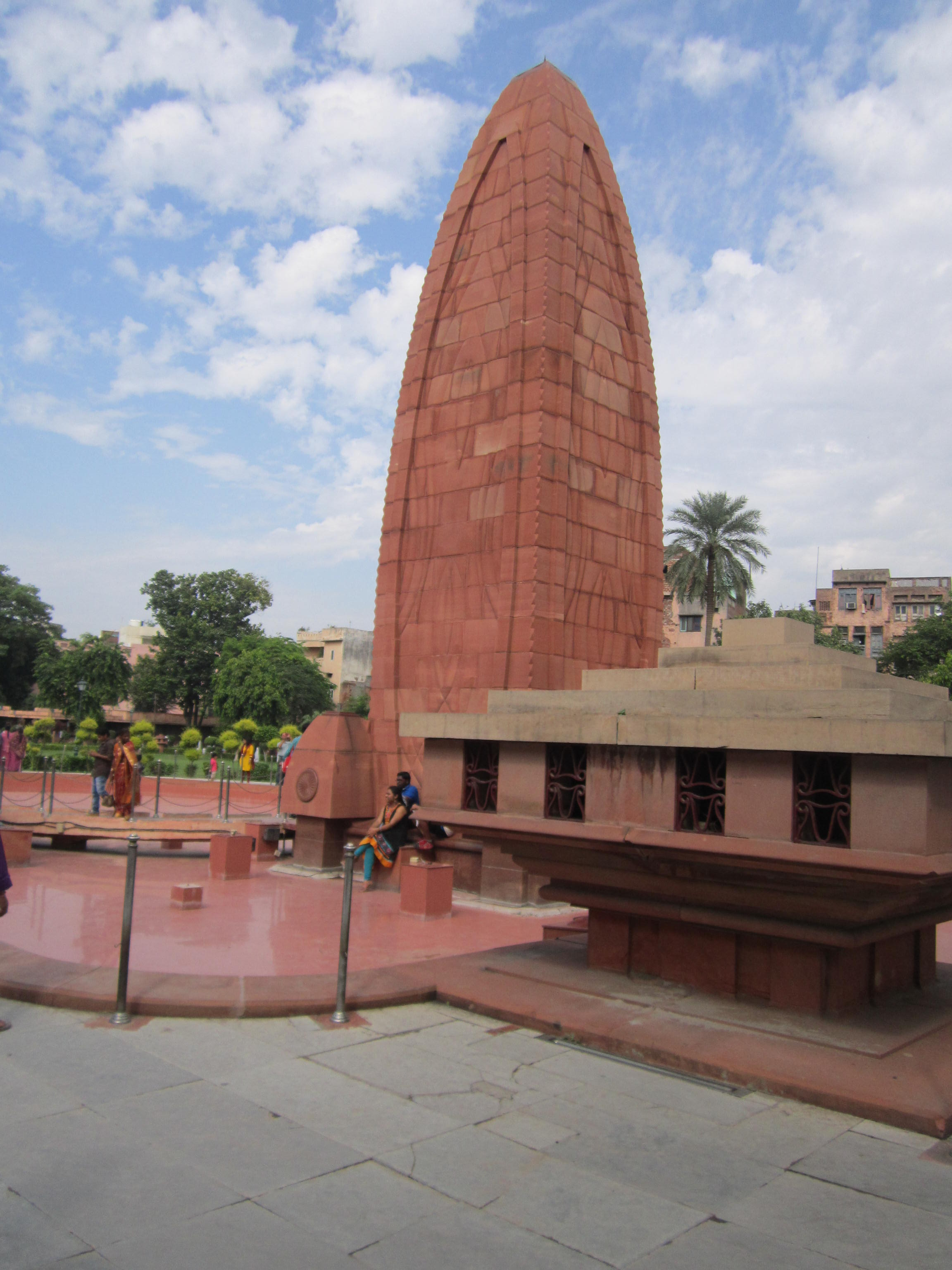
Martyr's memorial at Jallianwalla Bagh. In 1919, Brigadier-General Reginald Dyer ordered troops under his command to fire into a crowd of non-violent protestors, killing between 300 and 1,000 people. The act served to rally the Indian independence movement.

== Partition of Punjab (1947) ==
Map of Punjab region, as of today

In 1947, the Punjab Province of British India was divided along religious lines into West Punjab and East Punjab, with East Punjab containing modern states of Indian Punjab, Haryana and Himachal Pradesh. The Partition of India in 1947 split the former Raj province of Punjab; the mostly Muslim western part became the Pakistani province of West Punjab and the mostly Sikh and Hindu eastern part became the Indian province of Punjab. Many Sikhs and Hindus lived in the west, and many Muslims lived in the east, and so partition saw many people displaced and much intercommunal violence. All Punjabi princely states, except Bahawalpur, also became part of India.

The undivided Punjab, of which Punjab (Pakistan) forms a major region today, was home to a large minority population of Sikhs and Hindus unto 1947 apart from the Muslim majority. The Gurdaspur district which is partially now part of the Indian state of Punjab had a slight Muslim majority (50.2% according to the 1941 census) prior to the partition. Many Muslims fled the partition violence to settle in Pakistan. While many cities in what is now Pakistan—such as Rawalpindi, Nankana Sahib, and Sargodha etc.—had Hindu and Sikh majorities before 1947, other districts like Lahore, Sheikhupura, and Lyallpur (now Faisalabad) had sizable Hindu and Sikh populations, though not in the majority. The migration of Hindus and Sikhs to India began following communal violence in the Hazara region in December 1946, and intensified after the Rawalpindi Massacres of March 1947. This migration continued amid the broader wave of partition-related violence, lasting until and beyond the day of independence.

As stated, a major consequence of partition was the sudden shift towards religious homogeneity occurred in all districts across Punjab owing to the new international border that cut through the province. This rapid demographic shift was primarily due to wide scale migration but also caused by large-scale religious cleansing riots which were witnessed across the region at the time. According to historical demographer Tim Dyson, in the eastern regions of Punjab that ultimately became Indian Punjab following independence, districts that were 66% Hindu in 1941 became 80% Hindu in 1951; those that were 20% Sikh became 50% Sikh in 1951. Conversely, in the western regions of Punjab that ultimately became Pakistani Punjab, all districts became almost exclusively Muslim by 1951.

A major religious population exchange happened in 1947, which resulted in the following 1951 census: Muslim population noted as 300,246 persons (1.77%) in East Punjab (India), while in West Punjab (Pakistan), the 1951 census recorded a Hindu population of 33,052 persons (0.16%) and only 35 others (some of whom may have been Sikh).

== After independence ==
After the partition of Punjab, Eastern Punjab came to be known as Chardha Punjab while Western Punjab became known as Lehnda Punjab. Furthermore, a term for united Punjab was coined, being Sanjha Punjab. In Pakistani Punjab, owing to government and media views and activities, the usage of Punjabi declined in favour of Urdu. However, since the 1990s a language revitalization movement is underway to revive Punjabiyat in Pakistan.

=== Punjabi Subah ===
After independence, the Akali Dal, a Sikh-dominated political party active mainly in Punjab, sought to create a Sikh State but idea was not very popular. However, there was push in many regions of India for reorganisation of states based on language. In Punjab, instead of religion, the Akalis launched the Punjabi Suba movement aimed at creation of a Punjabi-majority subah ("province") in the erstwhile East Punjab state of India in the 1950s.In 1966, it resulted in the formation of the Punjabi speaking -majority Punjab state, the Haryanvi-Hindi-majority Haryana state and the Union Territory of Chandigarh. Some Pahari majority parts of the East Punjab were also merged with Himachal Pradesh as a result of the movement.

=== Khalistan movement ===
Some Sikhs called for the creation of a separate Sikh homeland known as Khalistan in the 1970s, along the lines of Pakistan, which led to a state of emergency being declared by Indira Gandhi, who believed the creation of Khalistan would drastically weaken India, particularly since the Punjab region grew up to 70% of the country's wheat (during the Green Revolution in India, incentives had been provided to the people of Punjab to switch to growing wheat exclusively). During Operation Blue Star, Gandhi further called in Indian troops to extinguish the few militants who had taken shelter in the Golden Temple, killing thousands of civilians in the crossfire. Attacks then targeted the Punjab State police and Indian Security forces that opposed the creation of Khalistan and wished Punjab stay under Indian rule.

== See also ==
- History of Pakistan
- History of India
- Panjab Digital Library

== Bibliography ==
=== Books ===
- Ali, Imran. The Punjab under imperialism, 1885–1947 (2014).
- Alram, Michael (2014). "From the Sasanians to the Huns New Numismatic Evidence from the Hindu Kush". The Numismatic Chronicle. 174: 261–291. JSTOR 44710198.
- Barua, Pradeep (2006), The State at War in South Asia, University of Nebraska Press, ISBN 978-0-8032-2785-9
- Banarsi Prasad Saksena (1992) [1970]. "The Khaljis: Alauddin Khalji". In Mohammad Habib and Khaliq Ahmad Nizami (ed.). A Comprehensive History of India: The Delhi Sultanat (A.D. 1206–1526). Vol. 5 (Second ed.). The Indian History Congress / People's Publishing House. OCLC 31870180.
- Bhaṅgū, R.S.; Singh, K.; Singh, K. (2006). Sri Gur Panth Prakash: Episodes 1 to 81. Institute of Sikh Studies. ISBN 978-81-85815-28-2. Archived from the original on 18 November 2022.
- Chattopadhyaya, Brajadulal (2003), Studying Early India: Archaeology, Texts, and Historical Issues, Permanent Black Publishers, ISBN 81-7824-143-9
- Condos, Mark. The Insecurity State: Punjab and the Making of Colonial Power in British India (2020) excerpt Archived 18 November 2022 at the Wayback Machine
- Daniélou, Alain (2003), A Brief History of India, Simon and Schuster, ISBN 978-0-89281-923-2
- Dhanoa, S.S. (2005). Raj Karega Khalsa (in Estonian). Sanbun Publishers. Archived from the original on 18 November 2022.
- Theodore Dodge (1890). Alexander. New York: Da Capo Press. pp. 592–608.
- Dyson, Tim (2018), A Population History of India: From the First Modern People to the Present Day, Oxford University Press, ISBN 978-0-19-882905-8
- George Erdosy (1995). The Indo-Aryans of Ancient South Asia: Language, Material Culture and Ethnicity. Walter de Gruyter. ISBN 978-3-11-014447-5.
- Flood, Gavin D. (1996), An Introduction to Hinduism, Cambridge University Press
- Frawley, David (2000), Gods, Sages and Kings: Vedic Secrets of Ancient Civilization, Lotus Press, ISBN 978-0-910261-37-1
- Gandhi, R. (2013). of the Book: Punjab: A History from Aurangzeb to Mountbatten.
- Grewal, J. S. (1990), The Sikhs of the Punjab, Cambridge University Press, ISBN 0-521-2688-4-2
- Habib, Irfan (2015). The Indus Civilization. Tulika Books. ISBN 978-93-82381-53-2.
- Jackson, Peter (2003). The Delhi Sultanate: A Political and Military History. Cambridge University Press.
- Jayapalan, N. (2001), History of India, Atlantic Publishers & Distributors (P) Limited, ISBN 978-81-7156-928-1
- Jestice, Phyllis (2004), Holy people of the world : a cross-cultural encyclopedia, ABC-CLIO, ISBN 978-1-57607-355-1, OCLC 57407318
- Johar, S.S. (1975). Guru Tegh Bahadur: A Biography. Abhinav Publications. ISBN 978-81-7017-030-3. Archived from the original on 18 November 2022.
- Kumar, Sunil (2020). "The Delhi Sultanate as Empire". In Bang, Peter Fibiger; Bayly, C. A.; Scheidel, Walter (eds.). The Oxford World History of Empire. Vol. 2. Oxford University Press.
- Lapidus, I. M. (2014), A History of Islamic Societies, Cambridge University Press, ISBN 978-1-139-99150-6, archived from the original on 18 November 2022
- Majumdar, R. C. (1977), Ancient India, Motilal Banarsidass, ISBN 978-81-208-0436-4
- Mani, C. M. (2005), A Journey Through India's Past, Northern Book Centre, ISBN 978-81-7211-194-6
- McIntosh, Jane (2008). The Ancient Indus Valley: New Perspectives. ABC-Clio. ISBN 978-1-57607-907-2.
- McLeod, Hew (1999), "Sikhs and Muslims in the Punjab", South Asia: Journal of South Asian Studies, 22 (sup001): 155–165, doi:10.1080/00856408708723379, ISSN 0085-6401
- Melton, J. G. (2014), Faiths Across Time: 5,000 Years of Religious History, ABC-CLIO, ISBN 978-1-61069-026-3
- Mohan, R. T. (2010), Afghanistan Revisited: The Brahmana Hindu Shahis of Afghanistan and the Punjab (c.840–1026 CE), MLBD
- Nesbitt, E. (2016). Sikhism: A Very Short Introduction. Very short introductions. Oxford University Press. ISBN 978-0-19-874557-0. Archived from the original on 18 November 2022.
- Rezakhani, Khodadad (2017b). "From the Kushans to the Western Turks". In Daryaee, Touraj (ed.). King of the Seven Climes: A History of the Ancient Iranian World (3000 BCE – 651 CE). UCI Jordan Center for Persian Studies. pp. 1–236. ISBN 978-0-692-86440-1.
- Romm, James S. (2012), The Landmark Arrian: The Campaigns of Alexander, Anchor Books, ISBN 978-1-4000-7967-4
- Scharfe, H. (2002), Handbook of Oriental Studies, Brill, ISBN 978-90-04-12556-8, archived from the original on 23 October 2022
- Seiple, Chris (2013), The Routledge Handbook of Religion and Security, Routledge, ISBN 978-0-415-66744-9, OCLC 781277896
- Singh, Khushwant (1984). A history of the Sikhs. Princeton University Press. ISBN 978-0-19-562643-8. OCLC 11819068.
- Singh, Khushwant (2006). The Illustrated History of the Sikhs. India: Oxford University Press. pp. 12–13. ISBN 0-19-567747-1.
- Singh, Ganda (1989), "History and Culture of Panjab Through The Ages", in Singh, Mohinder (ed.), History and Culture of Panjab, Atlantic Publishers, pp. 1–16, ISBN 978-8171560783
- Singh, H. (2008). Game of Love. Akaal Publishers. ISBN 978-0-9554587-1-2. Archived from the original on 18 November 2022.
- Singh, Pashaura; Fenech, Louis E., eds. (2016), The Oxford Handbook of Sikh Studies, Oxford University Press, ISBN 978-0-19-969930-8, OCLC 874522334
- Singh, Upinder (2017), Political Violence in Ancient India, Harvard University Press, ISBN 978-0-674-97527-9
- Thorpe, Showick; Thorpe, Edgar (2009), The Pearson General Studies Manual 2009, Pearson, ISBN 978-81-317-2133-9
- Wink, Andre (2002), Al-Hind, the Making of the Indo-Islamic World: Early Medieval India and the Expansion of Islam 7Th-11th Centuries, Brill, ISBN 978-0-391-04173-8
- Wright, Rita P. (2009). The Ancient Indus: Urbanism, Economy, and Society. Cambridge University Press. ISBN 978-0-521-57219-4.

=== Journals ===
- Digby, Simon (1976). "Mohammad Habib: Politics and society during the early medieval period. Collected works, Vol. 1. Edited by K. A. Nizami. xx, 451 pp., front. New Delhi: People's Publishing House [for the] Centre of Advanced Study, Dept. of History, Aligarh Muslim University, 1974. Rs. 50". Bulletin of the School of Oriental and African Studies. 39 (2). Cambridge University Press (CUP): 453. doi:10.1017/s0041977x0005028x. ISSN 0041-977X.
- Fenech, Louis E. (2001), "Martyrdom and the Execution of Guru Arjan in Early Sikh Sources", Journal of the American Oriental Society, 121 (1): 20–31, doi:10.2307/606726, ISSN 0003-0279, JSTOR 606726
- Giosan L, Clift PD, Macklin MG, Fuller DQ, et al. (2012). "Fluvial landscapes of the Harappan civilization". Proceedings of the National Academy of Sciences. 109 (26): E1688–E1694. Bibcode:2012PNAS..109E1688G. doi:10.1073/pnas.1112743109. ISSN 0027-8424. PMC 3387054. PMID 22645375.
- Talbot, I. A. (1980). "The 1946 Punjab Elections" Modern Asian Studies 14(1), 65–91 online Archived 28 January 2021 at the Wayback Machine.

=== Theses ===
- Rehman, Abdur (1976). The last two dynasties of the Sahis : an analysis of their history, archaeology, coinage and palaeography (PhD). doi:10.25911/5d74e50054bb9.
