= Olympic Oration or On Man's First Conception of God =

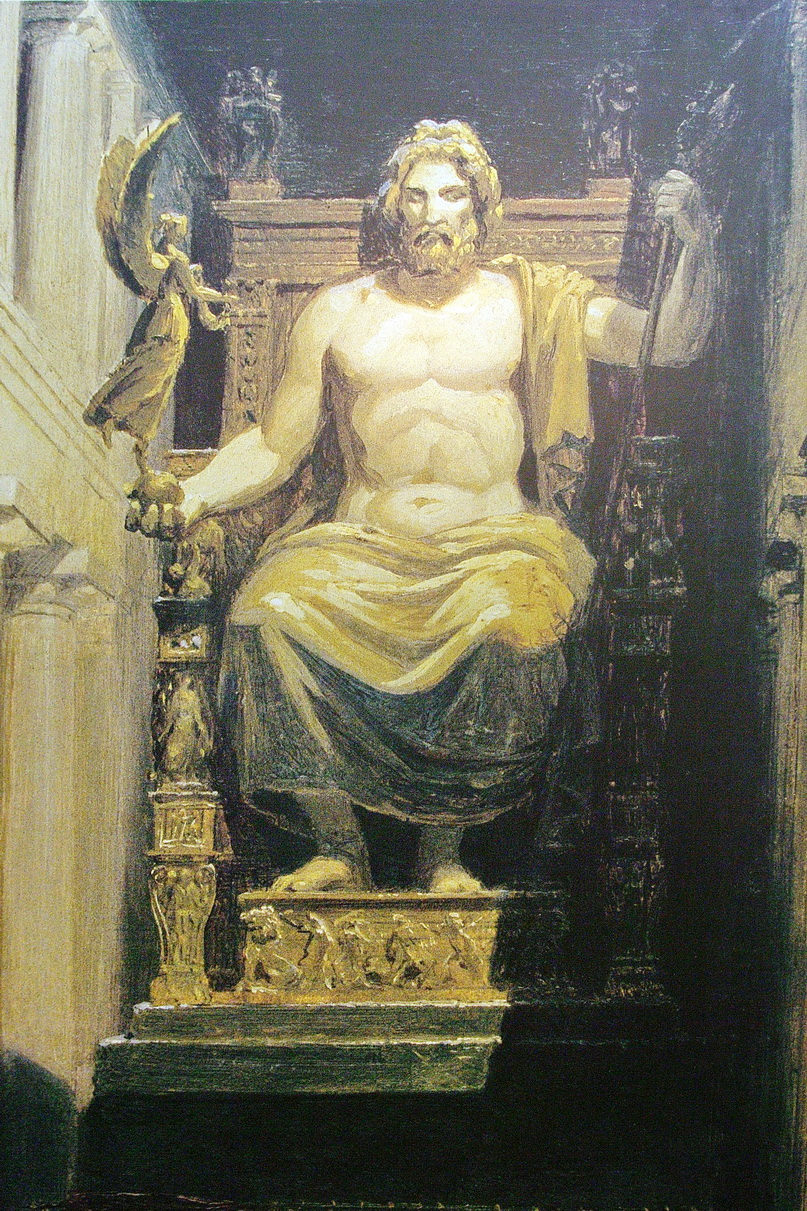
A modern reconstruction of the Statue of Zeus at Olympia, topic of the oration.

The Olympic Oration or On Man's First Conception of God (Ancient Greek: Ὀλυμπικὸς ἢ περὶ τῆς πρώτης τοῦ θεοῦ ἐννοίας, romanized: Olympikos ē peri tēs protēs tou theou ennoias, Oration 12 in modern corpora) is a speech delivered by Dio Chrysostom at the Olympic games in the 90s or 100s AD. The speech uses the Statue of Zeus at Olympia as a springboard to discuss how human beings envision God, both in terms of where human ideas about God come from and about the appropriateness of depicting God in human form. In the process, Dio contrasts literature and the visual arts. The oration is thus an important work in the history of ancient Greek theology and aesthetics. It has been called "a masterpiece of rhetoric, composition, and philosophical discourse."

== Background ==
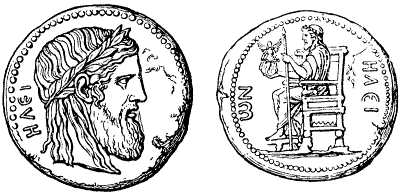
Depiction of the Statue of Zeus at Olympia on an early second century AD coin of Elis (the city-state that controlled Olympia).

Ancient Greek religion was polytheistic. Zeus, king of the Olympian gods, was considered the supreme god and it was common to refer to him simply as "God." He was frequently depicted in human form in literature and art. The Statue of Zeus at Olympia, made by Phidias around 435 BC, was a giant chryselephantine statue (made of gold and ivory), which was about 12.4 m (41 ft) high and depicted Zeus as a bearded man, seated on a throne, with a sceptre in his left hand and a winged Nike, personification of victory, in his right hand. It was the most famous artistic depiction of Zeus in ancient times, considered to be a masterpiece and one of the seven wonders of the ancient world.

Dio Chrysostom had been exiled by the Emperor Domitian in AD 82 and, according to his 13th oration, On his Banishment, he then adopted the guise of a Cynic philosopher, travelling through Greece and around the Black Sea. This oration was delivered shortly after his exile had been rescinded by Nerva, at the Olympic games of AD 97, 101 or 105, in accordance with a vow sworn long before. In the Roman Imperial period, orations by philosophers and sophists, like this one, were an important part of the attraction at the Olympics and other Panhellenic games - Dio's On Virtue and Isthmian Oration (Or. 8–9) were also written for delivery at games, as were several speeches of Aelius Aristides.

== Summary ==
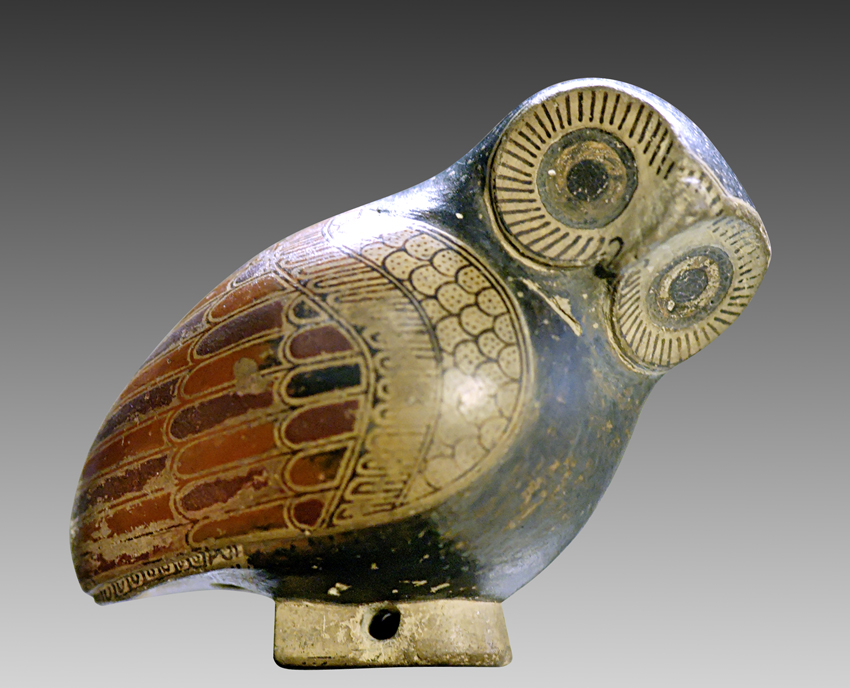
An owl-shaped proto-Corinthian aryballos, c. 640 BCE, from Greece

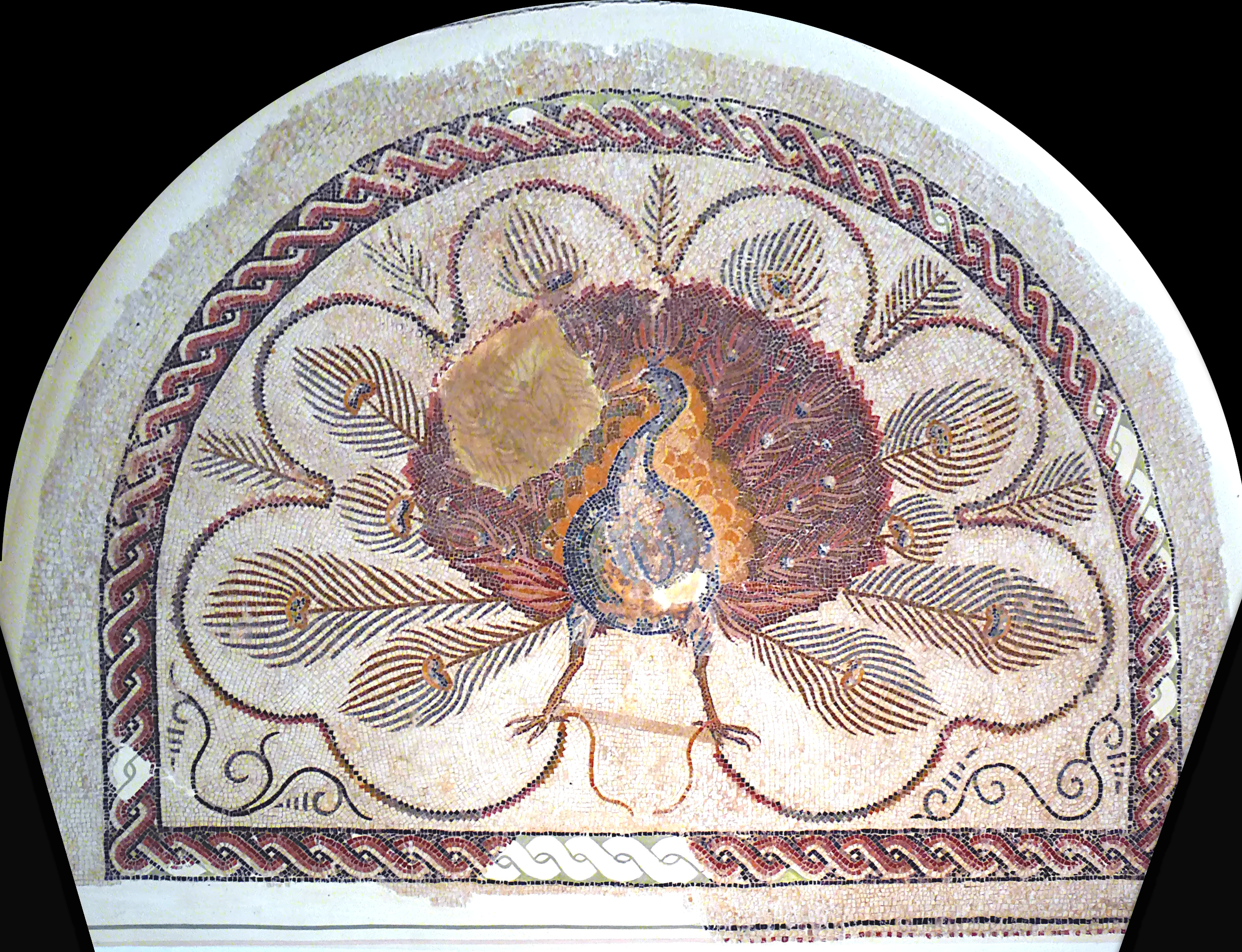
A peacock in a mosaic from Sousse.

The speech consists of three parts:

1. an introduction consisting of preamble, exordium, narratio, and praepositio (sections 1-26),
2. an argumentatio, presenting the basic conception of God as having something in common with human beings as innate (27-38) and a discussion of the sources of human ideas about God, with a special focus on art (39-48)
3. a speech in the persona of the sculptor Phidias defending his depiction of Zeus (49-83).

=== Introduction ===
Dio introduces his speech by commenting on the crowd that has flocked to hear him. He compares himself to the owl, which all birds flock to see when it hoots, contrasting this with the peacock which is much more visually impressive, but gets no such attention (2-4). As the owl was the bird associated with wisdom, this comparison allows him to identify himself as a philosopher and wise advisor, in contrast to other speakers and sights at Olympia, which have style without substance (7-8). Dio presents his key advice: "get to know men who are wise, clever, and understand everything" wherever they may be found, for wisdom leads to fame and virtue, which themselves lead to wealth (10-12). Dio identifies himself with Socrates and with Cynic philosophers (13-16).

Dio then pretends to deliberate on whether he should speak on his experiences in Dacia (17-20: the topic of his Borysthenitic Oration), deciding it is more appropriate to focus on Zeus (21-22). The praepositio (declaration of the topic) follows. Noting the literary depictions of Zeus in Hesiod and Homer and the visual depiction of Zeus by Phidias that had been dedicated in the sanctuary, Dio introduces the central theme of the discourse:

for us to investigate these depictions - poems and dedications - more carefully and whether there is something non-technical that actually moulds and crafts the human concept of the divine

— Dio Or. 12.26

=== Basic conception of God ===
The next part (27-38) deals with that basic underlying conception of God as a rational being with some similarity to human beings. He calls this opinion "inevitable and innate in every rational being, naturally, without any mortal teacher or prophet" (27) and claims that it has been shared by all human beings since the beginning of time. He says that the miraculous nature of the world and of human ability to describe it through language made it impossible for the original people to remain ignorant of God (28). God's affinity for humanity is proven by the fact that the Universe is shaped to human needs and by human superiority over animals (29-32). This belief in a rational supreme being, whose relationship to the universe is akin to the leader of a chorus of dancers or the pilot of a ship, is derived from experience of the universe itself (34). Dion denounces those who deny this position (i.e. Epicurean philosophers), as "cleverer than all wisdom," devoted to pleasure, and potentially dangerous (36-37).

=== Sources of human conceptions of God ===
In the next part (39-47), Dio identifies further sources of human conceptions of God. The innate source is the primary source, while these others are secondary, bracketed together as "speeches, stories, and customs" (logoi kai mythoi kai ethe, 39). The sources are:

1. The innate source discussed in the previous part, which is the primary source, and like the love of offspring for their parent (42)
2. Poetry, which is voluntary, encouraging people to be grateful to God as an older kinsman and creator;
3. Law, which compels and commands people through punishment for disobedience;
4. Artistic depictions, which are the topic of the following discussion;
5. Philosophy, briefly raised as a "fourth source," which reaches God most truly and perfectly through reason (47).

Then Dio introduces artistic depictions, which he breaks down into six types: outline drawing, combining colour with outlines, carving stone, working wood, casting metal, and shaping wax (44), as a fourth source which deserves to be placed on a par with poetry and law. The producers of artistic part of a tradition of wise men going back to Daedalus, who sometimes innovate in their depictions, but usually interpret (45) and who are important because they present the divine to the less experienced masses (46). When these different sources of knowledge are compared, Dio claims that they are mostly found to agree (48).

=== Phidias' defence ===
Dio now moves on to Phidias' statue of Zeus, presenting the scene as if Phidias were facing the audit (euthynai) which all public officials and contractors faced at the end of their term. However, instead of being asked to account for his financial expenditures, Dio challenges him to justify his artistic choices, in a brief speech by an anonymous prosecutor, who acknowledges the joy and pleasure that the statue brings, but asks "is this a fitting image and a form worthy of the nature of God?" (51-52). He stresses that the matter is important precisely because the image has shaped the conception of God in all people's minds (53).

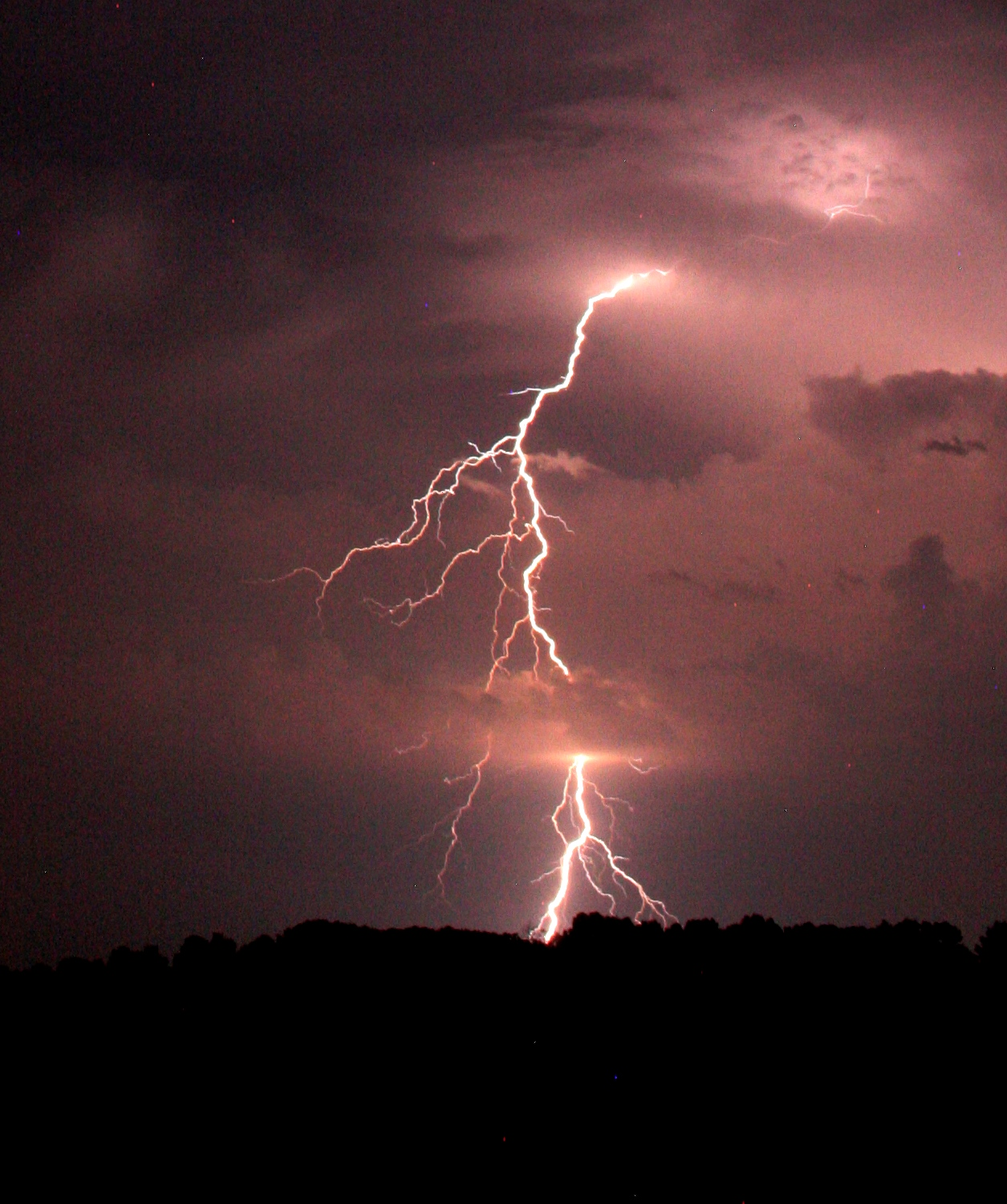
Image of a lightning bolt.

The rest of the oration consists of a speech within the speech delivered by Phidias in his defence (54-83). Phidias opens with a brief proem acknowledging the issue's importance (54-55). He emphasises his dependence on earlier ideas and his lack of alternatives to anthropomorphism - sculptures of "sun" and "moon" are not impressive and abstract concepts like "mind" cannot be depicted at all. The human body, as seat of the mind, is therefore an appropriate symbol of the divine intellect (56-59). Phidias argues that aniconism is not viable; human beings need a physically close image of the divine to worship, as infants reach out for their parents (60-61). Phidias claims that poetry has substantial advantages over visual arts (62-73). Whereas Homer is extravagant, and able to mix metaphors, and implant feeling directly in listeners' souls (62-67), visual artists are limited by their materials and assistants, and their sculpture can only depict a single posture, which must be the product of years of work (69-72). Phidias then justifies his design, as being as good as it is possible for a mortal to produce (74-82). He has derived his image of Zeus from Homer (73) and has fitted it to Zeus' epithets: father, king, protector of cities, protector of suppliants and guests, and giver of increase, through the image's size, facial expression, and human form (75-77). Other aspects of the god could not be depicted, especially those associated with Zeus' fury; Phidias dwells on the impossibility of adequately depicting a lightning bolt in sculpture (78-79). Phidias acknowledges that the materials used are not good enough for the God, but are the best possible, since a sculpture cannot be made of water or fire (80-82). He concludes:

So then, I do not concede that any human being ever has been greater than me in this art, but it is not possible for any mortal to match Zeus, craftsman of the whole cosmos.

— Dio, Or 12.82

A brief conclusion summarises the topics covered in the oration (84) and concludes with a short speech by Zeus praising the Eleans for their organisation of the Olympic festival but expressing his concern about the behaviour of the Greeks with a quote from Odyssey 24.249‑250 (84-85).

== Style ==
The oration is written in the good Attic style favoured by orators and literary critics of the second century AD. B. F. Harris characterises it as having "considerable" literary merit:

Dio speaks with persuasive charm... with a feeling for the picturesque phrase and the telling metaphor and with more than a little leavening of Socratic diffidence and irony

— B. F. Harris

He makes frequent use of analogy for effect and to advance his argument. For instance, when he compares the first humans' perception of God to the induction of initiates into religious knowledge in contemporary mystery religions, this allows him to present the primary perception is superior because derived directly from God, rather than through human intermediaries. He also returns several times to the conventional analogy of God as parent.

== Analysis ==
The work has been discussed by a number of modern theologians and scholars of the history of religion, as an important source for Greek religious thought in the Roman Imperial period and for the religious milieu of early Christianity.

=== Philosophical context ===
Dio's concepts of the primary conception of God and of human kinship with God are derived from Stoicism, especially that of Posidonius and Antiochus of Ascalon, which is known to us from Cicero's summary of their doctrines in book two of De Natura Deorum. Dio's attack on the Epicureans who deny God is also based on earlier ideas attributed by Cicero to Quintus Lucilius Balbus (Stoic) and Gaius Aurelius Cotta (New Academy), The fierceness of Dio's attack on the Epicurean position indicates its strength in his time. Dio's speech consistently identifies Zeus worshiped at Olympia with the philosophical idea of an absolute supreme being. This identification of the two concepts is encountered in other contemporary authors, notably Plutarch and Maximus of Tyre. B. F. Harris considers the speech as a whole to be "further evidence of that search after an intellectually and emotionally satisfying religious experience which occupied so many cultured men of the period." In his view, linking the figure of Zeus with this philosophical idea was important at the beginning of the Second Sophistic, as classical literature and mythology were being emphasised as essential to Greek culture.

Karl Reinhardt argued that Dio's sources of knowledge of God are derived from the theologia tripartita ("three-part theology") attributed by Augustine to Varro. This system identified three forms of theology: natural/physical, studied by philosophers; mythical, presented by poets; and civil, used by states. Reinhardt argued that Dio then added the primary conception as a first and prior source of God shared by all three forms of theology. This analysis fits Dio's schema in section 39 but the place of the artistic source within this schema is not clear. One possibility is that Dio has separated the "mythical" division between the poets and the visual artists; this makes sense since the oration is mostly focussed on the contrast between them. Andrew Sprague Becker argues that the cursory treatment of the philosopher that this would imply (mentioned only in section 47) is unacceptable, given that Dio emphasises his role as a philosopher so heavily in the preamble. Instead, he proposes that Dio's has equated philosophy with the primary source, making "the philosopher's role... to discover and explain what we already know; the philosopher becomes the most eloquent mouthpiece of what we all know by nature."

Hans Dieter Betz argues that Dio's discussion of divine images reflects an underlying tension in Greco-Roman thought between the admiration of expensive, colossal works of religious art and the rejection of them as wasteful and inappropriately anthropomorphic. The accusation speech distils the fear that worship of the god will be overtaken by worship of the artwork, "transform[ing] what should be a religious experience of encountering the deity into an aesthetic experience of viewing a glorified human being." This position is seen in the presentation of the Statue of Zeus by earlier authors, such as Callimachus and Strabo. Betz sees Phidias' speech as presenting "an entire theory of religious art," according to which any mortal representation of God would fall short, but images are nevertheless required because humans have a psychological desire to be close to God and to display the nature of God clearly to worshippers. The statue is thus a crutch used by worshippers to help them access their innate conception of God.

=== Comparisons with Christianity ===
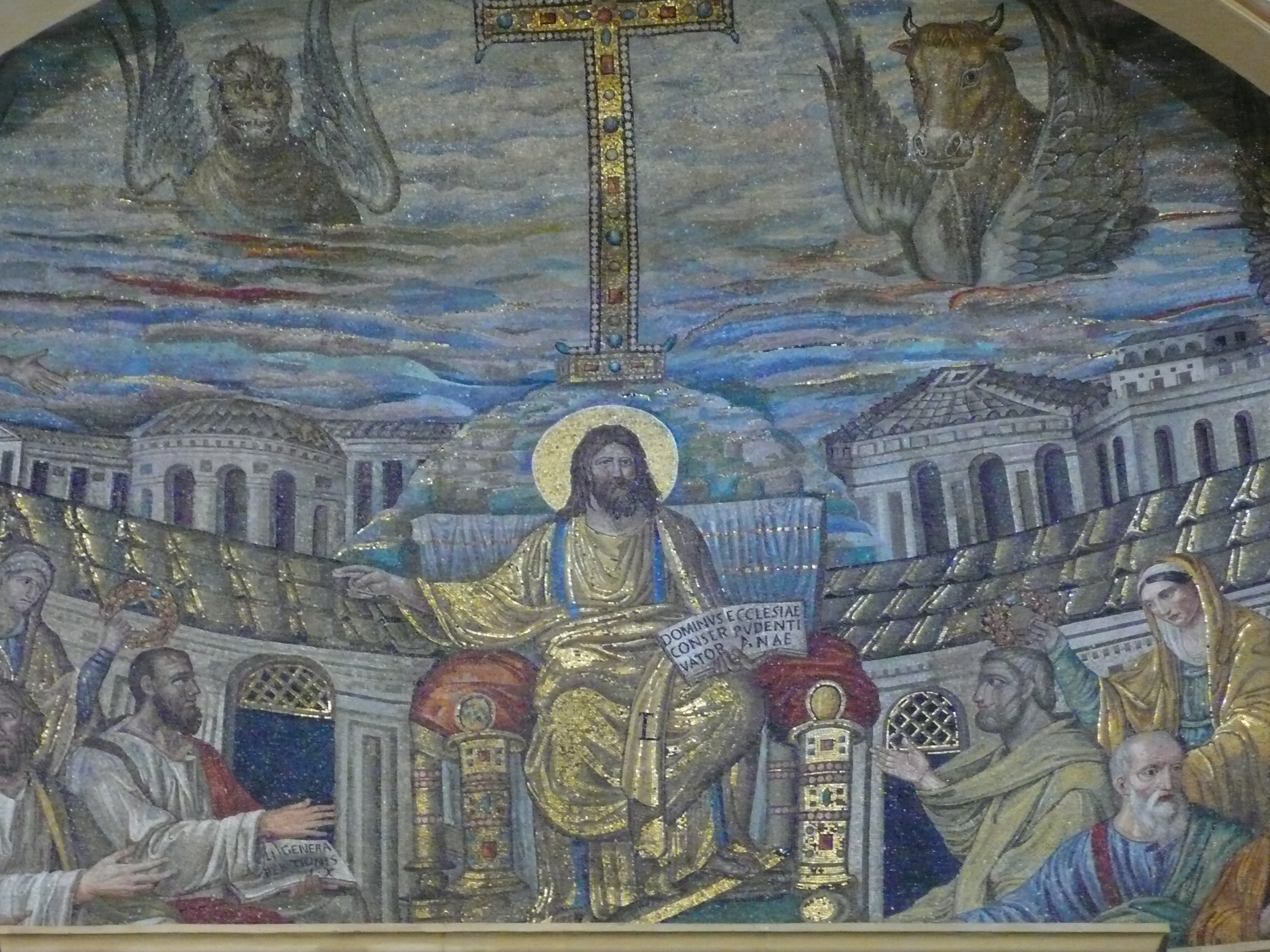
Depiction of Christ Pantokrator in Santa Pudenziana, Rome, c. 400–410 AD.

The speech's theological positions have been compared with early Christianity by several authors. The idea of a universal human conception of God is encountered also in the speech of Paul of Tarsus before the Areopagus in Acts. His attack on atheist beliefs parallels that of Paul in Romans 1.21. The depiction of God with a graven image was wholly rejected by early Christian thinkers, but Betz argues that the "image of Christ" which "reflect[s] the image of God" performs a similar role in Paul's theology to that of the statue in Dio's. Christoph Auffarth argues that Phidias' image of Olympian Zeus became the model for the depiction of Christ Pantokrator in the early fourth century AD, in part under the influence of discourses on the statue, like that of Dio.

=== Aesthetics ===
The Oration influenced Gotthold Ephraim Lessing's comparison of visual art and poetry in Laocoön, or the Limitations of Poetry, but whereas Dio argues for a common conception of God lying behind both literature and art, Lessing denies this.

== Editions ==
- Hans von Arnim, Dionis Prusaensis quem uocant Chrysostomum quae exstant omnia (Berlin, 1893–1896).
- Klauck, Hans-Josef (2000). Olympische Rede oder Über die erste Erkenntnis Gottes. Wissenschaftliche Buchgesellschaft. ISBN 9783534149476.
- Cohoon, J. W. (1939). Dio Chrysostom, II, Discourses 12-30. Princeton: Harvard University Press, Loeb Classical Library. ISBN 9781258030353.
- Russell, D. A. (1992). Dio Chrysostom Orations VII, XII, and XXXVI. Cambridge University Press. ISBN 978-0-521-37696-9.

== Bibliography ==
- Auffarth, Christoph (2010). "The Materiality of God's Image: The Olympian Zeus and Ancient Christology". In Bremmer, Jan; Erskine, Andrew (eds.). The Gods of Ancient Greece: Identities and Transformations. Edinburgh: Edinburgh University Press. pp. 465–480. doi:10.1515/9780748642892-029. ISBN 978-0-7486-4289-2.
- Becker, Andrew Sprague (1993). "The "Theologia Tripertita" in Dio Chrysostom's Olympian Oration". The Classical World. 87 (1): 67–71. doi:10.2307/4351445. ISSN 0009-8418. JSTOR 4351445.
- Betz, Hans Dieter (2004). "God Concept and Cultic Image: The Argument in Dio Chrysostom's "Oratio 12 (Olympikos)"". Illinois Classical Studies. 29: 131–142. ISSN 0363-1923. JSTOR 23065344.
- Harris, B. F. (1962). "The Olympian Oration of Dio Chrysostom". Journal of Religious History. 2 (2): 85–97. doi:10.1111/j.1467-9809.1962.tb00787.x.
- Hunter, R. L. (2018). The measure of Homer: the ancient reception of the Iliad and the Odyssey. Cambridge, United Kingdom: Cambridge University Press. pp. 82–84. ISBN 9781108583848.
- Kennedy, George Alexander (2008). The Art of Rhetoric in the Roman World. Eugene: Wipf and Stock Publishers. pp. 574ff. ISBN 9781725222410.
- Koelb, Janice Hewlett (2006). The poetics of description : imagined places in European literature. New York: Palgrave Macmillan. p. 46. ISBN 9780230601888.
- Nikolsky, Boris (2016). "Images of Zeus in Dio's Olympian Oration". Spudasmata. 169: 177–184.
- O'Sullivan, Patrick (2011). "Dio Chysostom and the Poetics of Phidias' Zeus". In McWilliam, Janette; Puttock, Sonia; Stevenson, Tom (eds.). The Statue of Zeus at Olympia: New Approaches. Cambridge Scholars Publishing. pp. 137–154. ISBN 978-1-4438-3032-4.
- Wojciechowski, Michał (2011). "Views of God in the Olympic Oration of Dio Chrysostom and in the Bible". Folia Orientalia. 48: 185–196.
