= In Athens, on his Banishment =

In Athens, on his Banishment or on his Exile (Ancient Greek: Έν Ἀθήναις περὶ φυγης, romanized: en Athenais peri phuges, Oration 13 in modern corpora) is a speech or speech-fragment by Dio Chrysostom, delivered in Athens, likely in AD 101. In it, Dio discusses his experience of being banished and how he found consolation in the philosophy of Socrates. He advises the Greeks and the people of Rome to do likewise and pursue Cynic moral philosophy rather than the cultural education like the Greeks or wealth and power like the Romans.

== Background ==
In the early Flavian period (AD 69–96), Dio Chrysostom was an important politician in his native city of Prusa in Bithynia and also in the city of Rome. However, he was banished from his home province of Bithynia by the emperor Domitian. Dio says that this was because he was the "friend and advisor" of someone who had been convicted of conspiracy against the emperor (section 1). This is generally connected with the execution of Titus Flavius Sabinus in AD 82 or 83, but other possibilities have been suggested, such as the execution of Lucius Salvius Otho Cocceianus in the 80s. This oration and scattered comments in other speeches are the only sources for the banishment. After the assassination of Domitian and accession of Nerva in AD 96, the banishment was cancelled and Dio was allowed to return home. This speech was delivered shortly thereafter.

== Summary ==
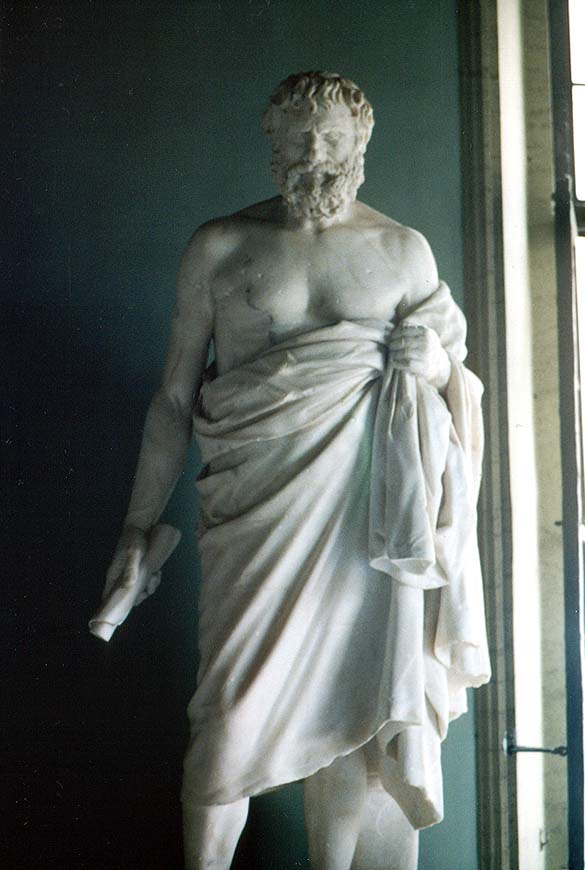
Statue of an unknown Cynic philosopher from the Capitoline Museums in Rome. Dio claims to have adopted similar costume during his exile.

The speech can be divided up into sections in various ways. Sections 1-28 focus on Greek culture and sections 29–37 on Rome. Thematically, there are three parts: Dio's initial reaction to being banished (section 1–13), a speech attributed to Socrates and targeted at the Athenians criticising the excessive focus on a traditional Greek education (14-27), and another Socratic speech to the Romans criticising excessive focus on wealth (29-37). Alternatively, Moles proposes a four-part structure: Dio's reaction to his exile (1-11), people's questions to Dio (12), Dio's response in imitation of Socrates (13-28), and Dio's attempt to apply these insights to Rome (29-37).

In the opening, Dio briefly mentions the fact of his exile and moves on to his state of mind. He mused about whether banishment is difficult for all people or if there are ways of coping with it (2), noting on the one hand that exemplary heroes like Odysseus and Orestes underwent great struggles to escape it (3-6), but on the other hand that the Oracle of Delphi advised Croesus to go into exile voluntarily, which means that the god Apollo must have considered it a fate preferable to death (6-8). Dio therefore decided to consult the oracle himself and:

he ordered me to do the same thing that I was already doing, with all enthusiasm, as it was a beautiful and beneficial activity, "until you reach the ends of the earth"

— Dio Chrysostom, Oration 13.10

Therefore, Dio adopted a humble costume and travelled around (11). This led people to take him for a philosopher and invite him to speak on philosophical topics. He was forced to learn philosophy, so that he could discourse "on what is proper for people and what they are likely to benefit from" (13). Dio says he sought to draw people away from a focus on money, reputation, and bodily pleasures. He attributes this to Socrates (13-15).

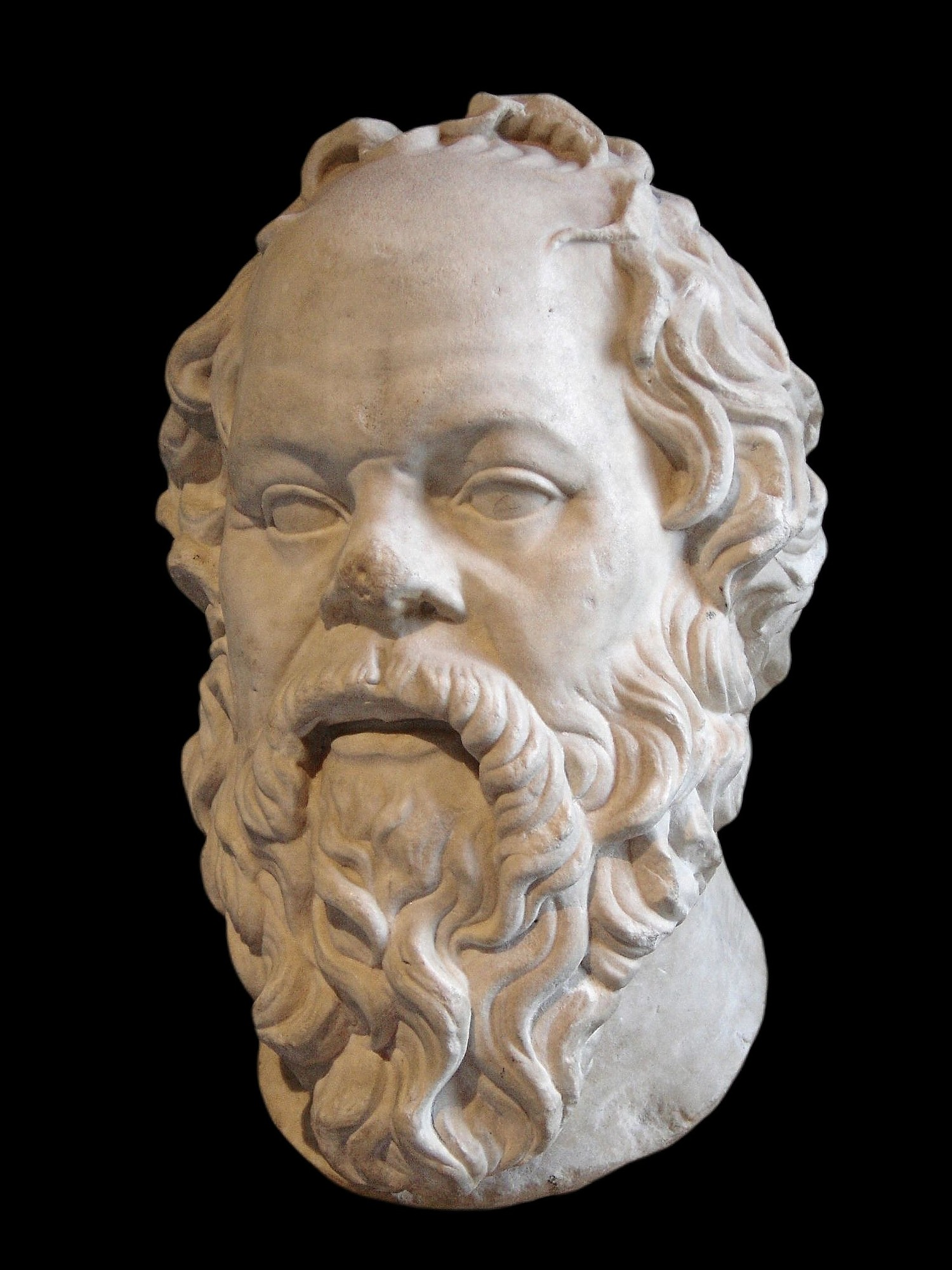
A marble bust of Socrates in the Louvre (copy of bronze head by Lysippus).

In the second part, he launches into the kind of oration that he says Socrates used to give to the Athenians, and which he attributes to Socrates. The focus of this section is criticism of the traditional components of an ancient Greek education (paideia), like playing the cithara, wrestling in the gymnasium, learning to read and write, and becoming familiar with classical literature (17-19), instead of what they need to know:

... in order that you will know what is beneficial for yourselves and your country, govern yourselves and live together lawfully and justly with harmony, neither wronging nor plotting against each other...

— Dio Chrysostom, Oration 13.19

The uselessness of other pursuits is shown by myth: wealth did not rich people, like Atreus, Agamemnon, and Oedipus from misfortune, nor did musical knowledge protect Thamyris, and inventing writing and mathematics did not save Palamedes, either (20-21). Learning oratory is no substitute for statesmanship (22). Dio rejects the argument that an exemplary education helped the Athenians win the Persian Wars; this was simply because the Persians did not know how to philosophise either (23-26). He concludes that ignorance of how to be "glorious and good" (kalos kagathos) is considered shameful and that philosophy (not paidea) is the true source of knowledge of how to be "glorious and good" (27-28).

In a brief bridge, Dio notes that this kind of discourse may be "old fashioned and trite", but it nevertheless has truth to it, and that he considered it safer to speak in the persona of Socrates than to speak in his own person and be considered old-fashioned and foolish himself (27-31). He then launches into the kind of Socratic speech that he used to deliver at Rome (it is unclear how he could have done this while in exile), exorting the Romans to find teachers, whether Roman, Greek, Scythian, or Indian, to teach them self-control (sophrosyne), manly virtue (andreia), and justice (dikaosyne), comparing such a teacher to a doctor for their soul (32-33). Only in this way can Rome "be great, strong, and truly leaders" (34). He claims that a focus on virtue instead of luxury would solve Rome's problems with overpopulation, comparing the city to an overladen ship (35). In gathering wealth, Rome only invites disaster, like Achilles piling treasures on Patroclus' funeral pyre in order to attract the winds and set it alight (36). Finally, he concludes that the fact that the Romans have already mastered all forms of military knowledge shows that they have the capacity to learn philosophy also.

The speech breaks off abruptly and it appears that the end is lost. However, John Moles argues that the lost section was not long and the work is "substantially complete."

== Analysis ==
John Moles emphasises the "creativity and philosophical expertise of the oration", as well as the way that it "weaves seemingly diverse themes into a complex unity." He sees the overall purpose of the speech as an argument for the replacement of both Greek cultural learning and Roman military training with the moral and philosophical training of a Cynic philosopher.

The "Socratic" speech which Dio presents in the second part of his oration appears to be derived from the Clitophon, a Socratic dialogue traditionally attributed to Plato, but now considered pseudonymous. Sections 14-21 parallel Clitophon 407b-e, 409a; section 22 parallels Clitophon 408b and 410b, with other material from Plato's Gorgias and Protagoras; section 27 parallels Clitophon 407d, 408b-c. Sections 23–26 on Athens and the Persians are not in Clitophon. Trapp suggests that they derived from a work of Antisthenes, one of Socrates pupils. Scholars such as Georg Ferdinand Dümmler and Hans von Arnim argued that Dio's discourse and the Clitophon derived from a common source by Antisthenes that is now lost. Trapp characterises this as "perverse" and argues that Dio's material should be assumed to come from the Clitophon directly. Aldo Brancacci considers the protreptic element of the oration to be a characteristic of Antisthenes and prefers to derive Dio's oration from the (lost) Protrepticus of Antisthenes.

Paolo Desideri argues that Dio's criticism of the city of Rome in this discourse is part of a wider theme in his work, which characterises large cities as leading their citizens to moral vice, standing at risk of social disorder, and depriving individuals of their freedom. He finds this theme also in the Euboean Oration, the Alexandrian Oration, the Oration Delivered in Celaenae in Phrygia and On Freedom.

== Editions ==
- von Arnim, Hans (1893–1896). Dionis Prusaensis quem uocant Chrysostomum quae exstant omnia. Berlin: Wiedmann.
- Cohoon, J. W. (1939). Dio Chrysostom, II, Discourses 12-30. Princeton: Harvard University Press, Loeb Classical Library. ISBN 9781258030353.
- Verrengia, Alfredo (2000). Dione di Prusa: In Atene, sull'esilio : (or. XIII). Napoli: Lettere italiane. ISBN 9788871883823.

== Bibliography ==
- Brancacci, Aldo (2000). "Dio, Socrates, and Cynicism". In Swain, Simon (ed.). Dio Chrysostom : politics, letters, and philosophy. Oxford: Oxford University Press. pp. 240–260. ISBN 9780199255214.
- Claassen, J.M. (1999). Displaced Persons. The Literature of Exile from Cicero to Boethius. London.
- Desideri, Paolo (2000). "City and Country in Dio". In Swain, Simon (ed.). Dio Chrysostom : politics, letters, and philosophy. Oxford: Oxford University Press. pp. 93–107. ISBN 9780199255214.
- Jones, Christopher Prestige (1978). The Roman World of Dio Chrysostom. Harvard University Press. ISBN 978-0-674-77915-0.
- Moles, John (1995). "Dio Chrysostom, Greece, and Rome". In Innes, D.; Hine, H.; Pelling, C. (eds.). Ethics and Rhetoric. Classical Essays for Donald Russell on his Seventy-fifth Birthday. Oxford: Oxford University Press. pp. 177–9.
- Moles, John (2005). "The Thirteenth Oration of Dio Chrysostom: Complexity and Simplicity, Rhetoric and Moralism, Literature and Life". The Journal of Hellenic Studies. 125: 112–138. doi:10.1017/S0075426900007138. ISSN 0075-4269. JSTOR 30033348.
- Trapp, Michael (2000). "Plato in Dio". In Swain, Simon (ed.). Dio Chrysostom : politics, letters, and philosophy. Oxford: Oxford University Press. pp. 213–239. ISBN 9780199255214.
- Sidebottom, Harry (1996). "Dio of Prusa and the Flavian Dynasty". The Classical Quarterly. 46 (2): 447–456. doi:10.1093/cq/46.2.447. ISSN 0009-8388. JSTOR 639801.
