= Diogenes or on Servants =

1st century speech by Dio Chrysostom

Diogenes or on Servants (Ancient Greek: Διογένης ἢ περὶ οἰκέτων, romanized: Diogenēs e peri oiketōn, Oration 10 in modern corpora) is a short speech delivered by Dio Chrysostom between AD 82 and 96, presenting a dialogue between Diogenes of Sinope and an unnamed traveller, which presents arguments against slavery and consulting oracles.

== Background ==
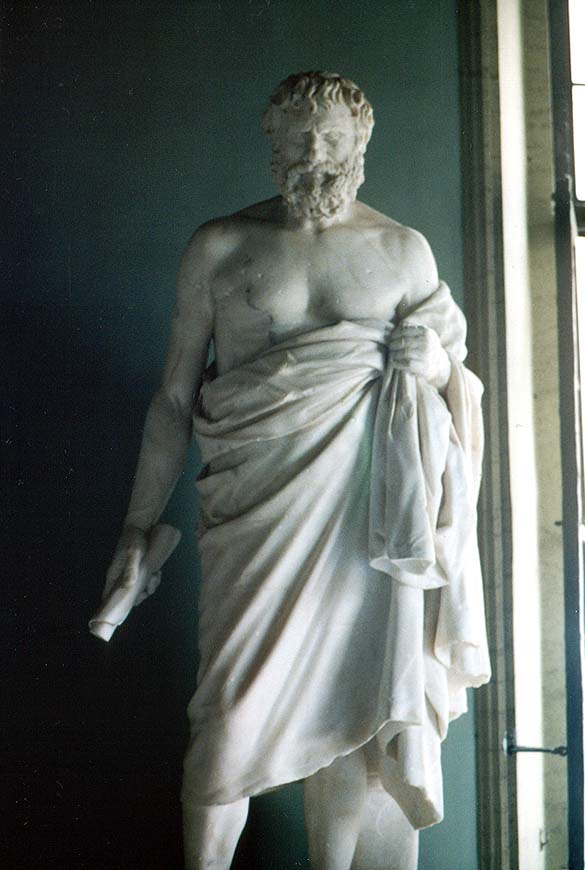
Statue of an unknown Cynic philosopher from the Capitoline Museums in Rome.

The fourth-century BC philosopher Diogenes became a proponent of the Cynic school of philosophy after being exiled from his hometown of Sinope. He was famous for his very ascetic lifestyle, living outdoors and going without shoes or clothes. Dio Chrysostom was exiled by the Emperor Domitian in AD 82 and, according to his 13th oration, On his Banishment, he then adopted the guise of a Cynic philosopher and travelled Greece and the Black Sea, delivering orations like this one.

== Summary ==
The speech opens with Diogenes encountering an unnamed traveller on the road from Corinth to Athens. The traveller had been planning to visit the Oracle of Delphi, but his slave attendant has run away, so he is detouring to Corinth in order to search for the slave there (1-2). The rest of the speech falls into two broad parts.

In the first part (2-16), Diogenes seeks to persuade the traveller that hunting the slave is pointless. He argues that a slave who has run away is by definition a bad slave and that possessing anything bad is harmful to the possessor (2-6). The traveller claims that he wants to find the slave in order to punish him for ingratitude, since he had been easy on the slave and had done him no harm. Diogenes responds that this behaviour must have caused the slave to become bad, the worst form of harm one can do to someone (6-7). The traveller next claims that if he does not recover the slave, he will have no slave at all. Diogenes responds that it is better not to have a thing, than to have a bad version of that thing. For example, it is better to go barefoot than to wear a shoe that is harming the foot (8-9). Diogenes argues that it is better not to have slaves at all, observing that:

... nature has made each man a body that is sufficient for looking after himself.

— Dio, Oration 10.10

Slaves bring additional expenditure for their food and medical treatment, have to be watched in case they steal their master's property, and cause a man's wife and children to become argumentative and lazy (12-13). Finally, the traveller suggests that he should recover the slave in order to sell him and buy a good one, but Diogenes responds that selling something one knows to be bad is fraud and that a focus on acquisition of property merely turns oneself into a slave to material things; the best approach would be to own no property at all, like animals (13-16). The traveller concedes defeat.

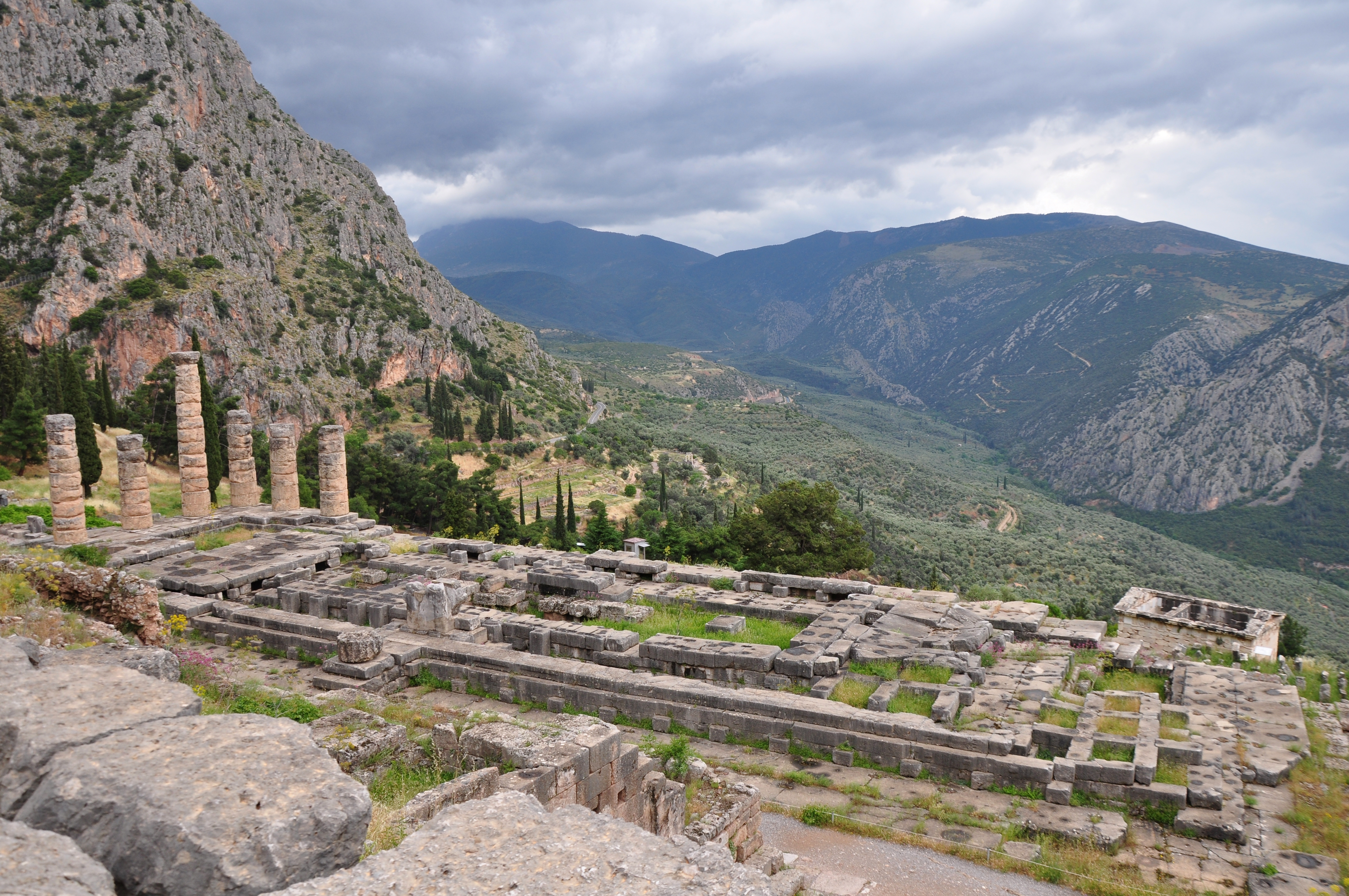
Seat of the oracle in the Temple of Apollo at Delphi.

In the second part of the speech (17-28), Diogenes seeks to persuade the traveller that consulting the oracle is also a bad idea. First Diogenes points out that using something without fully understanding how to use it is dangerous, giving the examples of an untrained man trying to ride a horse, employ hunting dogs, play a lyre, use the rudder of a boat, or fight with shield and sword (17-20). The "greater" the thing, the more dangerous it is to attempt to use it without full understanding - for example, riding a horse without training is generally more dangerous than employing a hunting dog (21). Diogenes notes the Delphic maxim "know thyself" and concludes that the god gives this out as a general command to all people and that one cannot properly make use of oneself until one understands oneself. Since the gods are "greater" than a human, one should not even attempt to use them until one has gained the knowledge to make use oneself safely (21-22). Examples from Homer show that the gods speak a different language from humans and there is a serious risk of misinterpreting the gods' words, as the examples of Laius, Croesus, and Orestes (23-26). He concludes:

First you should focus on knowing yourself and then, once you have become wise, if it seems good to you, then you could consult the oracle.

— Dio, Oration 10.27

In practice, however, the wise man will probably not feel the need to consult an oracle, since he will already know what the best course of action is, as a result of being wise (28).

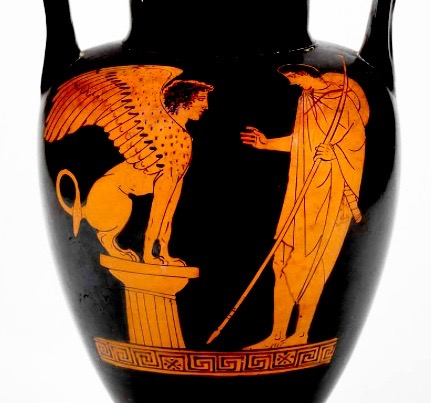
Oedipus and the Sphinx on a red-figure amphora, ca. 450 BC.

The speech concludes with a short revisionist account of Oedipus, in which Diogenes claims that his problems arose from consulting an oracle without sufficient understanding and that his behaviour once he discovered that he had married his own mother proved his stupidity - he should have kept the matter secret or just legalised it and he certainly did not need to blind himself in order to go into exile (29-30). The sphinx whose riddle Oedipus solved was an allegory for ignorance and, in claiming to have vanquished ignorance, Oedipus only proved himself especially stupid, like a sophist (31-32).

== Analysis ==
Dio Chrysostom is more critical of slavery than any other ancient author. He appears to be the only preserved ancient moralist to outright call for the abolition of slavery. His criticism of the institution draws on the Stoic idea that harming others is bad for the harmer. He also refers to the idea that true slavery is the failure to control one's passions and implies that natural slavery does not exist. He discusses these points in more detail in On Slavery and Freedom I, II, and the Euboean Oration. Despite the comments in these orations, In Defence of his Relations with Prusa shows that Dio sought to recover his lost slaves when he was allowed to return from exile in AD 96.

== Editions ==
- Hans von Arnim, Dionis Prusaensis quem uocant Chrysostomum quae exstant omnia (Berlin, 1893–1896).
- Cohoon, J. W. (1932). Dio Chrysostom, I, Discourses 1–11. Princeton: Harvard University Press, Loeb Classical Library. ISBN 9780674992832.

== Bibliography ==
- Brunt, P. A. (1973). "Aspects of the Social Thought of Dio Chrysostom and of the Stoics". Proceedings of the Cambridge Philological Society. 19 (199): 9–34. doi:10.1017/S0068673500003576. ISSN 0068-6735. JSTOR 44696657.
- Moles, J. L. (1978). "The Career and Conversion of Dio Chrysostom". The Journal of Hellenic Studies. 98: 79–100. doi:10.2307/630194. ISSN 0075-4269. JSTOR 630194.
