= On Training for Public Speaking =

On Training for Public Speaking (Ancient Greek: Περὶ λόγου ἀσκήσεως, romanized: Peri logou askēseōs, Oration 18 in modern corpora) is a short text written by Dio Chrysostom in the late first or early second century AD. The work takes the form of a letter to an anonymous man of affairs who has decided to train as a public speaker. It mostly consists of recommendations of authors for the recipient to read as examples of good style. The text is thus an important source on the formation of the Greek Classical canon in the early Roman Empire.

== Background and recipient ==
Dio Chrysostom was one of the first members of the Second Sophistic, a Greek cultural movement under the Roman Empire that prized oratorical performance in the style of the Classical Greek orators. Professional orators, like Dio, often trained from childhood and speaking was for them a full-time occupation, but some oratorical ability was expected of all public figures. Dio's text offers advice for a man of affairs who does not have time for full oratorical training but nevertheless wishes to expand his capabilities. Most of the text consists of recommendations of authors that the recipient should read as exemplars. Similar lists are attested from the late first-century BC Greek literary critic Dionysius of Halicarnassus (On Imitation 2), and the mid-first century AD Latin rhetorician Quintilian (Institutes 10.1.37-131). All three lists have a similar structure and substantial overlap. There is also some overlap with the assessment of Greek orators in Hermogenes of Tarsus' On Ideas 2.10.

Dio's text takes the form of a letter to a man whom he does not name but identifies as a "statesman" (politikos aner), who is "in the very prime of life and second to no one in influence, who possesses great wealth and has every opportunity to live in luxury by day and night" but nevertheless chooses to pursue oratory (sections 1–2). Hans von Arnim suggested that the addressee might have been a leading aristocrat in one of the Greek cities of Asia Minor or perhaps the Roman emperor Vespasian before his accession. Wilhelm von Christ suggested the Emperor Nerva, known to have had some connection with Dio. Other scholars have argued that the addressee is fictional.

== Summary ==
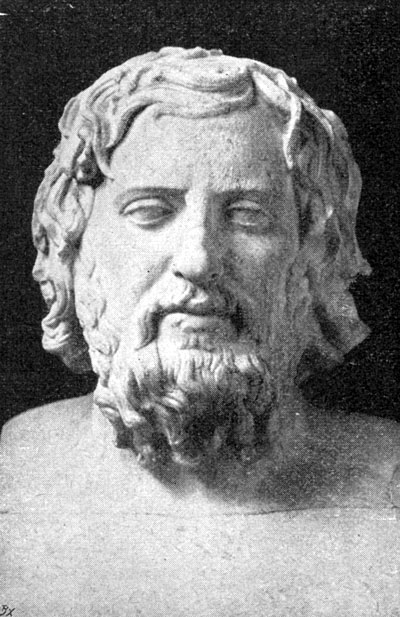
Bust of Xenophon, whom Dio identifies as the best author for statesmen to read.

The work opens with a short introduction (sections 1–4), congratulating the addressee on his decision to seek oratorical training despite his wealth and power, agreeing with him that such training is necessary for a statesman, and professing to be flattered to have been asked for advice. Dio explains that his recommendations are designed as a moderate regime for an adult who can only study part-time; his recommendations for full-time study from childhood would be different (5).

The bulk of the text consists of Dio's recommendations of works that the addressee should read as exemplars (6-17). Dio first recommends the comic playwright Menander and the tragedian Euripides (rather than earlier authors). He praises both for writing pleasantly and with mimesis; the latter also provides many quotable sayings (6-7). He also recommends as much Homer as possible, but time pressure precludes any other poets (8).

Dio encourages the addressee to read historians, both for the speeches which they placed in the mouths of historical actors and as a source of practical experience (9). In his assessment of historians, Dio presents a spectrum from Herodotus, whose writing is very pleasant, but "like myth more than history" to Ephorus, who provides lots of useful historical information, but has a very poor writing style. In between are Thucydides, who is the best historian, and then Theopompus (10).

Dio next discusses the Attic orators of the fourth century BC. He identifies Demosthenes and Lysias as the best, but the addressee should focus on Hyperides and Aeschines, who are simpler and easier to imitate, while still being very good. In addition, he recommends Lycurgus for his "simplicity and nobility" (11). Dio also recommends reading post-Classical orators, specifically Antipater, Theodorus, Plution, and Conon, because they could be criticised, unlike the Classical orators, whom Dio considers beyond reproach (12). Dio notes that the inclusion of contemporary authors might be controversial; other Greek literary surveys of this period avoid post-classical authors altogether.

Dio stresses the need to read the Socratics, but the only one he names is Xenophon, whom he praises extensively, "I think Xenophon - and he alone among the ancients - is able to meet the needs of the statesman," since his ideas are clear, simple, and easy, his narrative is pleasant and true-to-life, he provides example speeches for all situations that a statesman might face, and he combined words, deeds, and actual lived experience (13-17). This praise of Xenophon is part of a general phenomenon in Imperial-period literary criticism.

Finally, Dio offers some general advice on practicing oratory (18-19): it is better to dictate a speech than to write it, school exercises should mostly be avoided, but producing responses or paraphrases of Xenophon's speeches might be useful, and reciting them would be good practice.

In a short self-deprecating conclusion (20-21), Dio praises his addressee, suggests that they meet to read and discuss literature together.

== Editions ==
- von Arnim, Hans (1893–1896). Dionis Prusaensis quem uocant Chrysostomum quae exstant omnia. Berlin: Wiedmann.
- Cohoon, J. W. (1939). Dio Chrysostom, II, Discourses 12-30. Princeton: Harvard University Press, Loeb Classical Library. ISBN 9781258030353.

== Bibliography ==
- de Jonge, Casper C. (2022). "Greek Reading Lists from Dionysius to Dio: Rhetorical Imitation in the Augustan Age and the Second Sophistic". In König, Jason; Wiater, Nicolas (eds.). Late Hellenistic Greek literature in dialogue. Cambridge, United Kingdom: Cambridge University Press. pp. 319–350. ISBN 9781316516683.
- Jones, C. P. (1978). The Roman world of Dio Chrysostom. Cambridge, Mass.: Harvard University Press. pp. 7–8. ISBN 9780674779150.
- Matijašić, Ivan (2018). Shaping the canons of ancient Greek historiography : imitation, classicism, and literary criticism. Berlin: De Gruyter. ISBN 9783110476279.
- Rutherford, Ian (1992). "Inverting the Canon: Hermogenes on Literature". Harvard Studies in Classical Philology. 94: 355–378. doi:10.2307/311437. ISSN 0073-0688. JSTOR 311437.
- Walker, Jeffrey (2011). The genuine teachers of this art : rhetorical education in antiquity. [Columbia]: University of South Carolina Press. ISBN 9781611171822.
- Wright, Brian J. (2018). Communal Reading in the Time of Jesus : a Window into Early Christian Reading Practices. Baltimore, Maryland: Project Muse. pp. 84–88. ISBN 9781506438498.
