= Statue of Zeus at Olympia =

Ancient Greek sculpture by Phidias

Coordinates: 37°38′16.3″N 21°37′48″E

- Ἄγαλμα τοῦ Ὀλυμπίου Διός (Ancient Greek)
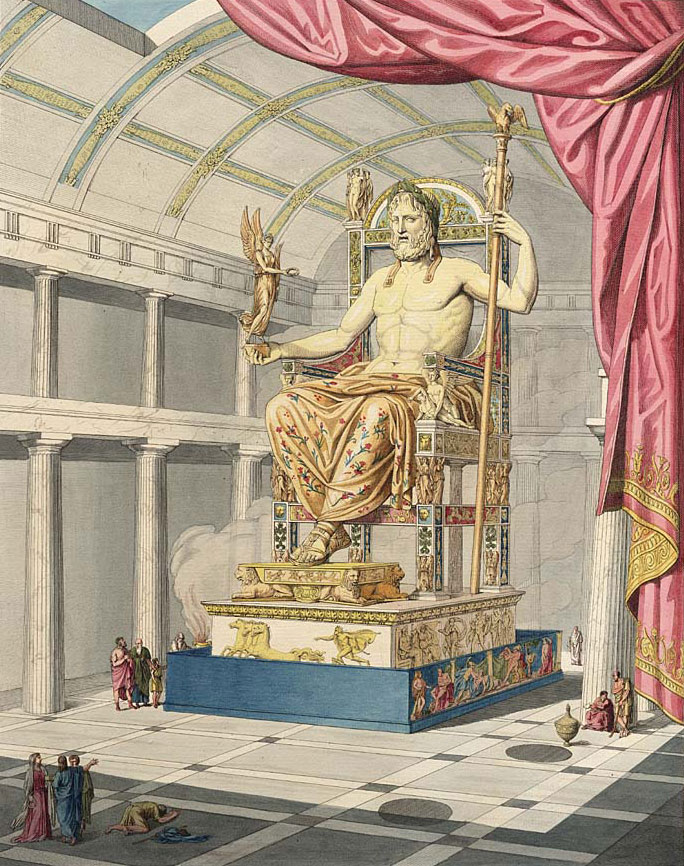
- Drawing of a reconstruction of the Statue of Zeus by Quatremère de Quincy (1815)
- Interactive map of Statue of Zeus at Olympia
- Location: Olympia, Greece

History
- Built: c. 435 BC
- Built by: Phidias

Site notes
- Condition: Completely destroyed

UNESCO World Heritage Site
- Criteria: i, ii, iii, iv, vi
- Designated: 1989
- Part of: Archaeological Site of Olympia
- Reference no.: 517

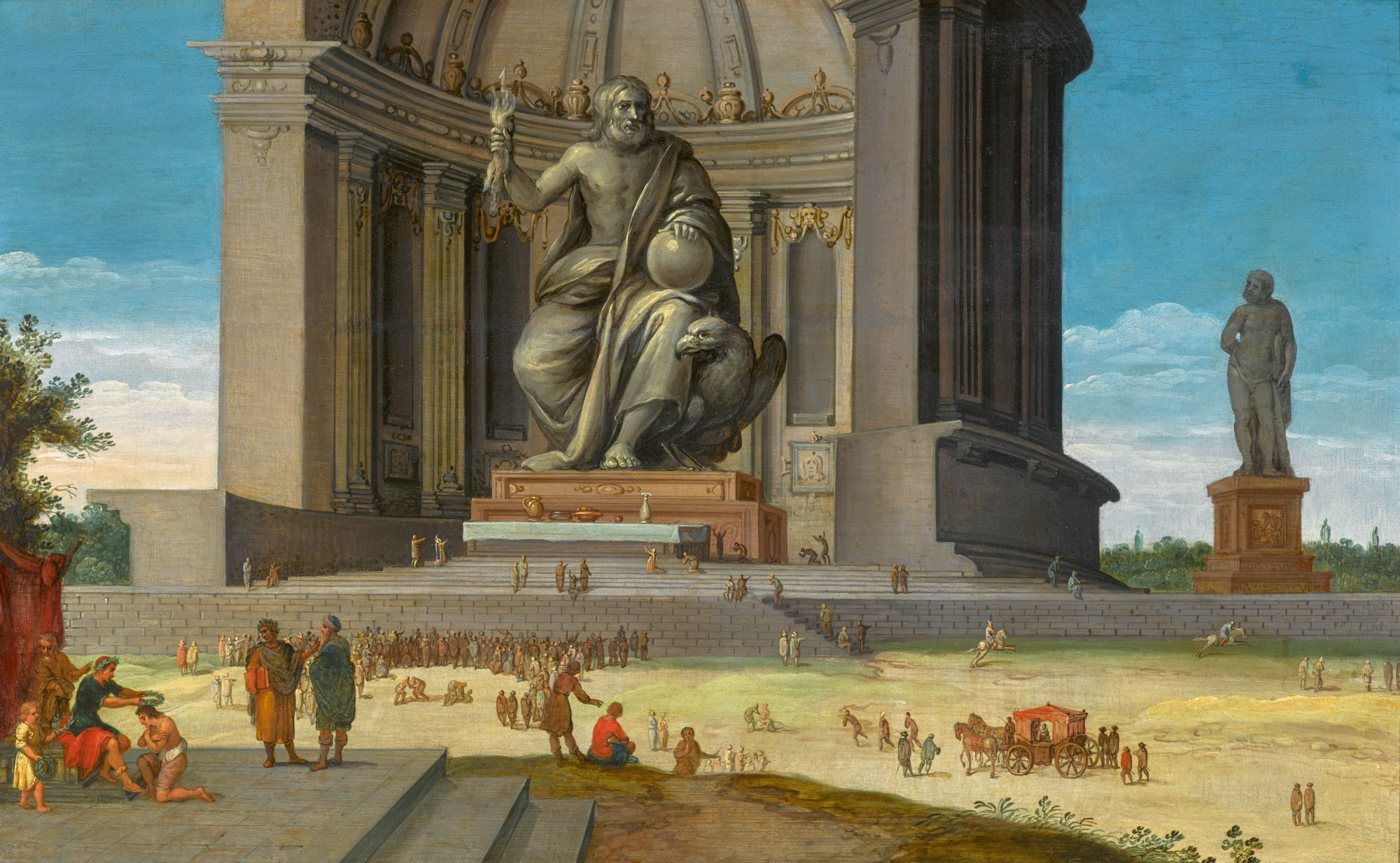
The Phidian Statue of Zeus at Olympia, with Olympic Games Taking Place at its Feet, oil painting by Jacob van der Ulft

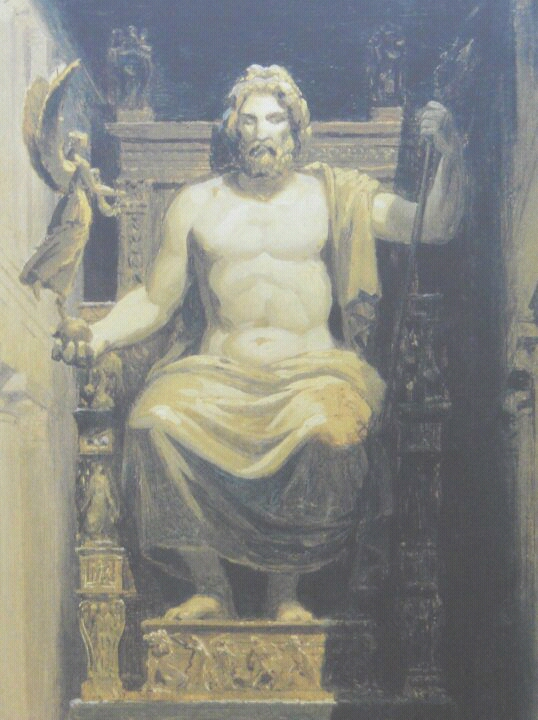
An artist's reconstruction of the Statue of Zeus

The Statue of Zeus at Olympia was a giant seated figure, about 12.4 m (41 ft) tall, made by the Greek sculptor Phidias around 435 BC at the sanctuary of Olympia, Greece, and erected in the Temple of Zeus there. Zeus is the sky and thunder god in ancient Greek religion, who rules as king of the gods on Mount Olympus.

The statue was a chryselephantine sculpture of ivory plates and gold panels on a wooden framework. Zeus sat on a painted cedarwood throne ornamented with ebony, ivory, gold, and precious stones. It was one of the Seven Wonders of the Ancient World.

The statue was lost and destroyed before the end of the 6th century AD, with conflicting accounts of the date and circumstances. Details of its form are known only from ancient Greek descriptions and representations on coins and art.

== History ==
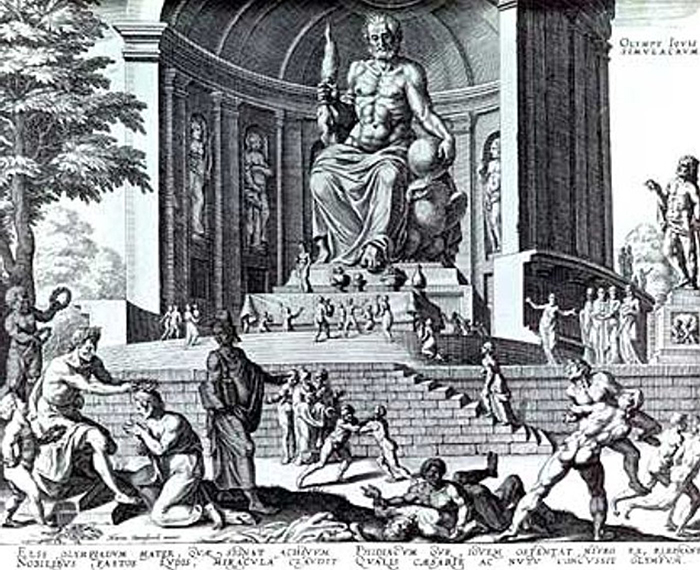
Drawing from the 1572 Octo Mundi Miracula, the earliest known representation of the statue in modern times. The engraving was made by Philippe Galle, from a drawing by Maarten van Heemskerck

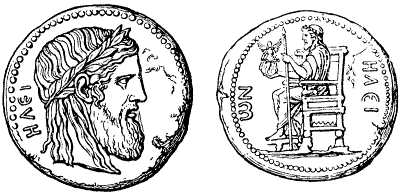
Drawings of the reverses of two Roman Provincial coins from Elis minted by Hadrian depicting the Statue of Zeus (Nordisk familjebok)

The statue of Zeus was commissioned by the Eleans, custodians of the Olympic Games, in the latter half of the fifth century BC for their newly constructed Temple of Zeus. Seeking to outdo their Athenian rivals, the Eleans employed sculptor Phidias, who had previously made the massive statue of Athena Parthenos in the Parthenon.

The statue occupied half the width of the aisle of the temple built to house it. The geographer Strabo noted early in the 1st century BC that the statue gave "the impression that if Zeus arose and stood erect he would unroof the temple." The Zeus was a chryselephantine sculpture, made with ivory and gold panels on a wooden substructure. No copy in marble or bronze has survived, though there are recognizable but only approximate versions on coins of nearby Elis and on Roman coins and engraved gems.

The 2nd-century AD geographer and traveler Pausanias left a detailed description: the statue was crowned with a sculpted wreath of olive sprays and wore a gilded robe made from glass and carved with animals and lilies. Its right hand held a small chryselephantine statue of crowned Nike, goddess of victory; its left a scepter inlaid with many metals, supporting an eagle. The throne featured painted figures and wrought images and was decorated with gold, precious stones, ebony, and ivory. Zeus' golden sandals rested upon a footstool decorated with an Amazonomachy in relief. The passage underneath the throne was restricted by painted screens.

Pausanias also recounts that the statue was kept constantly coated with olive oil to counter the harmful effect on the ivory caused by the "marshiness" of the Altis grove. The floor in front of the image was paved with black tiles and surrounded by a raised rim of marble to contain the oil. Rashna Taraporewalla considers it probable that this reservoir acted as a reflecting pool which added to the visual impression of the statue.

According to the Roman historian Livy, the Roman general Aemilius Paullus (the victor over Macedon) saw the statue and "was moved to his soul, as if he had seen the god in person", and according to Plutarch, Aemilius Paullus "made that utterance which is now on every mouth, that Pheidias had moulded the Zeus of Homer". The 1st-century AD Greek orator Dio Chrysostom declared that a single glimpse of the statue would make a man forget all his earthly troubles.

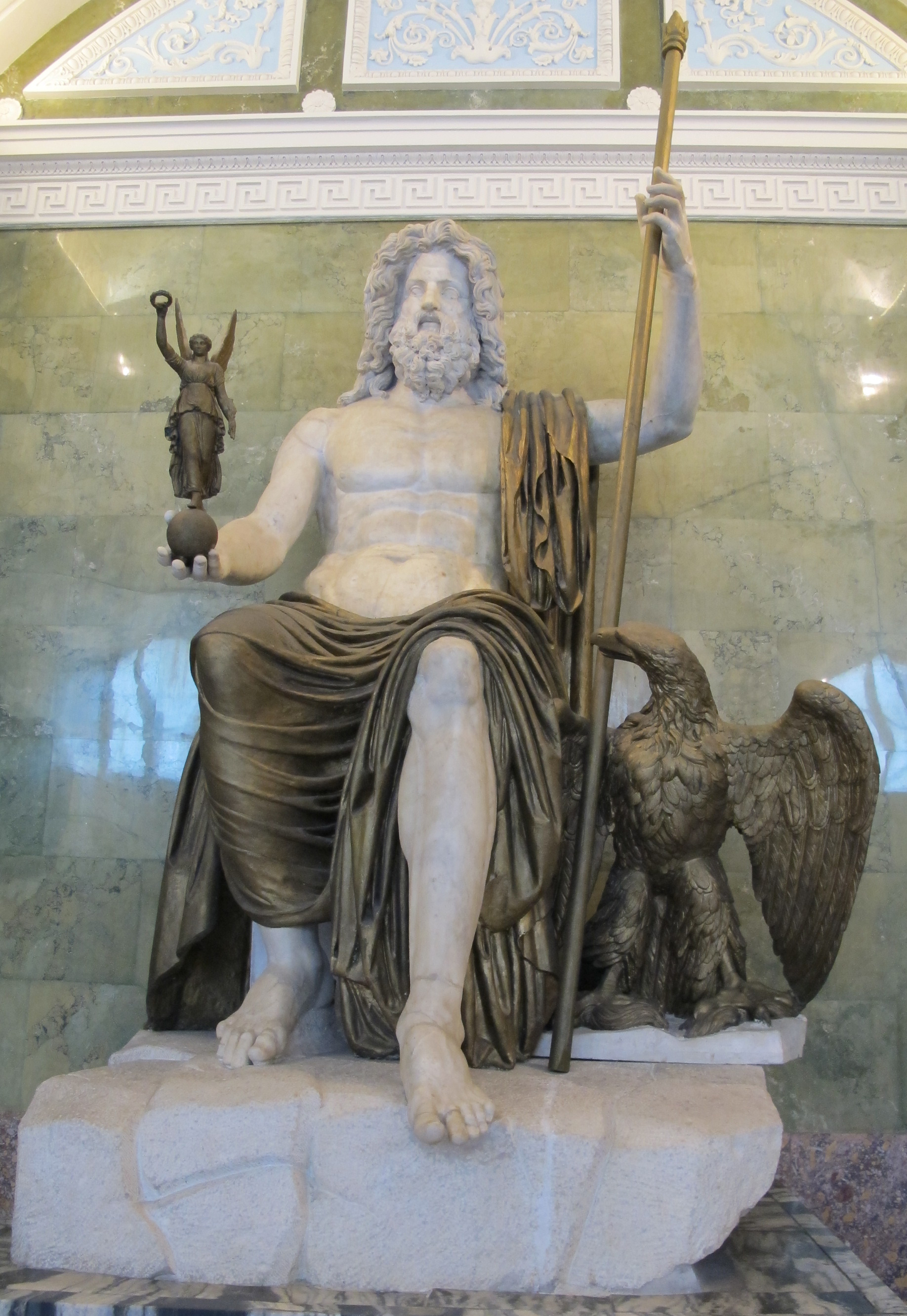
The Statue of Jupiter (Hermitage), marble and bronzed plaster, following the type established by Phidias (Hermitage Museum)

According to Strabo, when Phidias was asked about the model he would use for his Zeus, he answered that he would portray Zeus according to these words of Homer:

The son of Cronos spoke, and bowed his dark brow in assent, and the ambrosial locks waved from the king's immortal head; and he made great Olympus quake (English translation by A.T. Murray).

The sculptor also was reputed to have immortalized Pantarkes, the winner of the boys' wrestling event at the eighty-sixth Olympiad who was said to have been his "beloved" (eromenos), by carving Pantarkes kalos ("Pantarkes is beautiful") into Zeus's little finger, and by placing a relief of the boy crowning himself at the feet of the statue.

According to Pausanias, "when the image was quite finished Pheidias prayed the god to show by a sign whether the work was to his liking. Immediately, runs the legend, a thunderbolt fell on that part of the floor where down to the present day the bronze jar stood to cover the place."

== Loss and destruction ==
According to Roman historian Suetonius, the Roman Emperor Caligula gave orders that "such statues of the gods as were especially famous for their sanctity or their artistic merit, including that of Jupiter at Olympia, should be brought from Greece, in order to remove their heads and put his own in their place." The emperor was assassinated before this could happen, in 41 AD; his death was supposedly foretold by the statue, which "suddenly uttered such a peal of laughter that the scaffolding collapsed and the workmen took to their heels."

In 391 AD, the Christian Roman emperor Theodosius I banned participation in pagan cults and closed the temples. The sanctuary at Olympia fell into disuse. The circumstances of the statue's eventual destruction are unknown. The 11th-century Byzantine historian Georgios Kedrenos records a tradition that it was carried off to Constantinople, where it was destroyed in the great fire of the Palace of Lausus, in 475 AD.

Alternatively, the statue perished along with the temple, which was severely damaged by fire in 425 AD. But earlier loss or damage is implied by Lucian of Samosata in the later 2nd century, who referenced it in Timon: "they have laid hands on your person at Olympia, my lord High-Thunderer, and you had not the energy to wake the dogs or call in the neighbours; surely they might have come to the rescue and caught the fellows before they had finished packing up the loot."

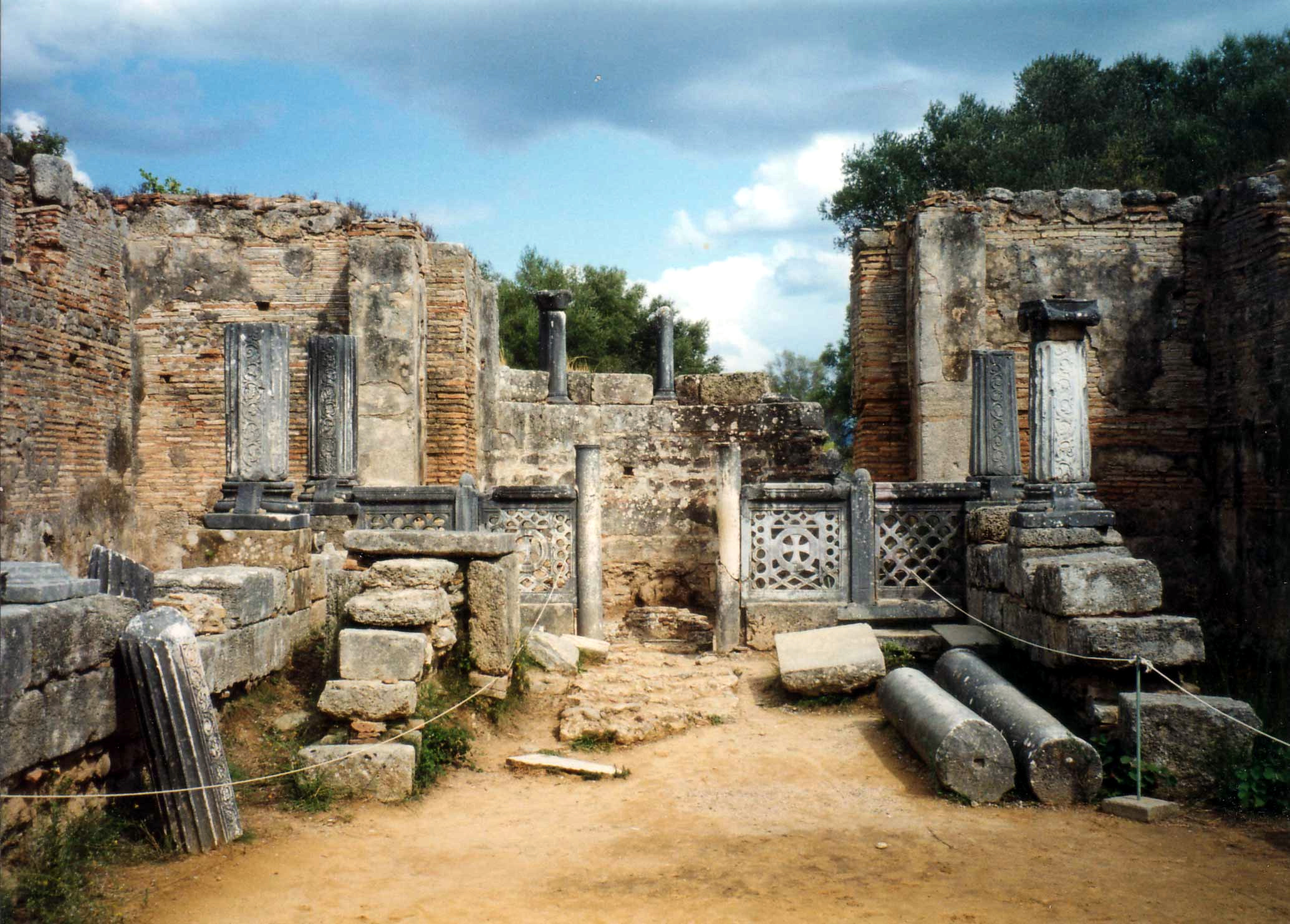
2005 photo of Phidias' workshop at Olympia

== Phidias' workshop ==
The approximate date of the statue (the third quarter of the 5th century BC) was confirmed in the rediscovery in 1954–1958 of Phidias' workshop, approximately where Pausanias said the statue of Zeus was constructed. Archaeological finds included tools for working gold and ivory, ivory chippings, precious stones and terracotta moulds. Most of the latter were used to create glass plaques, and to form the statue's robe from sheets of glass, naturalistically draped and folded, then gilded. A cup inscribed "ΦΕΙΔΙΟΥ ΕΙΜΙ" or "I belong to Phidias" was also found at the site. However, the inscription is considered by some to be a forgery.

== See also ==
- List of tallest statues
- Olympic Oration or On Man's First Conception of God
- George Washington, 1840 statue
- Great Buddha of Kyoto Lost giant statue of Japan, like Zeus at Olympia

== Bibliography ==
- Homer, The Iliad with an English Translation by A.T. Murray, Ph.D. in two volumes. Cambridge, Massachusetts, Harvard University Press; London, William Heinemann, Ltd. 1924. Online version at the Perseus Digital Library.
- Lapatin, Kenneth D. S., Chryselephantine Statuary in the Ancient Mediterranean World, Oxford University Press (2001) ISBN 0-19-815311-2
- Macrobius, Saturnalia, Volume II: Books 3-5, edited and translated by Robert A. Kaster, Loeb Classical Library No. 511, Cambridge, Massachusetts, Harvard University Press, 2011. ISBN 978-0-674-99649-6. Online version at Harvard University Press.
- Mallwitz, Alfred and Wolfgang Schiering, Die Werkstatt des Pheidias in Olympia I: Olympische Forschungen V, Berlin: Walter de Gruyter (1964)
- McWilliam, Janette; Puttock, Sonia; Stevenson, Tom, eds. (2011). The Statue of Zeus at Olympia: New Approaches. Cambridge Scholars Publishing. ISBN 978-1-4438-3032-4.
- Schiering, Wolfgang, Die Werkstatt des Pheidias in Olympia II: Werkstattfunde: Olympische Forschungen XVIII, Berlin: Walter de Gruyter (1991) ISBN 3-11-012468-8
- Strabo, Geography, translated by Horace Leonard Jones; Cambridge, Massachusetts: Harvard University Press; London: William Heinemann, Ltd. (1924). LacusCurtis, Online version at the Perseus Digital Library, Books 6–14.
