= Diogenes or On Virtue =

Speech by Dio Chrysostom

Diogenes or On Virtue (Ancient Greek: Διογένης ἢ περὶ ἀρετῆς, romanized: Diogenēs e peri aretēs, Oration 8 in modern corpora) is a speech delivered by Dio Chrysostom between AD 82 and 96, which is presented as a speech delivered by the Cynic philosopher Diogenes of Sinope at the Isthmian Games. It presents the superiority of a Cynic lifestyle, through a comparison with the professional athlete and a revisionist account of the life of Heracles. The oration forms a pair with the Isthmian Oration, which continues the story of Diogenes' visit to the Isthmian Games with many of the same themes.

== Background ==
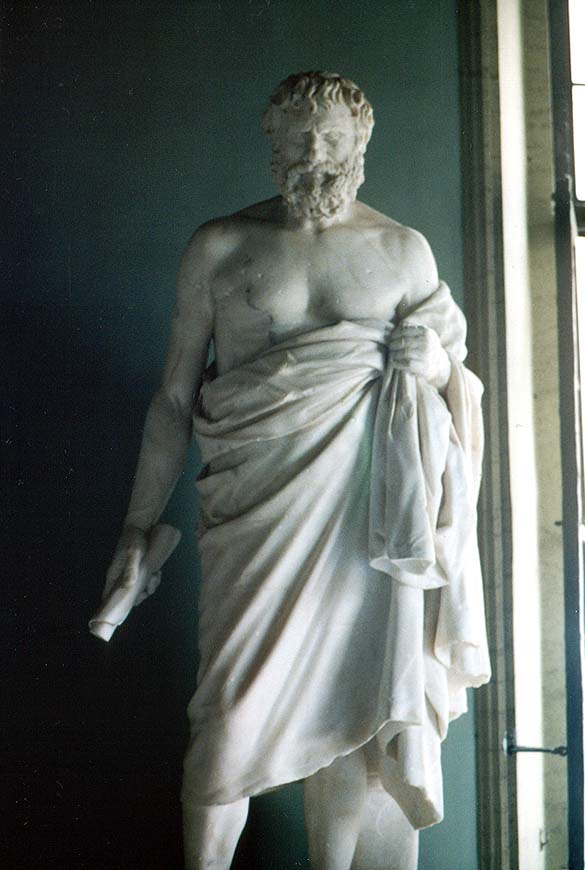
Statue of an unknown Cynic philosopher from the Capitoline Museums in Rome.

The fourth-century BC philosopher Diogenes founded the Cynic school of philosophy after being exiled from his hometown of Sinope. He was famous for his very ascetic lifestyle, living outdoors and going without shoes or clothes. Dio Chrysostom was exiled by the Emperor Domitian in AD 82 and, according to his 13th oration, On his Banishment, he then adopted the guise of a Cynic philosopher and travelled Greece and the Black Sea, delivering orations like this one.

== Summary ==
The speech consists of an introduction (sections 1-10), a speech supposedly delivered by Diogenes at the Isthmian Games (11-35), and a brief conclusion (36).

The introduction explains how Diogenes came to Athens and met Antisthenes, the founder of Cynicism and contrasts Antisthenes' mastery of virtuous doctrine with Diogenes' mastery of a virtuous lifestyle (1-4). Dio then recounts how Diogenes moved to Corinth after Antisthenes' death and made a habit of attending the Isthmian Games held there, with an extended metaphor of the philosopher as a doctor for spiritual illness (5-8). At the games, sightseers flock to see sophists and spectacles, among which Diogenes draws large crowds, who mostly find his presentation too challenging (9-10)

Diogenes' speech (11-35) contains three parts. In the first part (11-19), Diogenes explains that he has come to the games "not to watch but to compete" (11). His "rivals" are not athletes but "hardships" (Ancient Greek: πόνοι, romanized: ponoi), such hunger, thirst, cold, exile, and disreputable things. He explains how this competition is superior to the athletic competitions of the games and how he is superior to the athletes who compete only from time-to-time at games festivals and for useless prizes, while he is competing always and for "happiness and virtue" (13-16). Diogenes explains that the only way to defeat hardships is by fighting them constantly, fearlessly, and totally:

If one accepts hardships with disdain and approaches them enthusiastically, they are entirely powerless against him, but if he holds back and gives way to them, they seem entirely too big and fierce for him.

— Dio Chrysostom Or. 8.18

This is illustrated by a number of similes - facing hardship is like scaring off a fierce dog, fighting a boxing match, putting out a flame with one's tongue, or fighting the pancratium (17-19).

In the second part (20-26), Diogenes explains the best strategy for meeting a second opponent: "pleasure" (Ancient Greek: ἡδονή, romanized: hēdonē). Here the approach is the opposite: pleasure must be avoided altogether, since any engagement with pleasure leads to defeat (24). Whereas the battle with hardship is like the combat of the heroic warriors in Homer's Iliad, pleasure is like Circe from the Odyssey, who needed only the slightest moment to transform Odysseus' men into pigs and wolves.

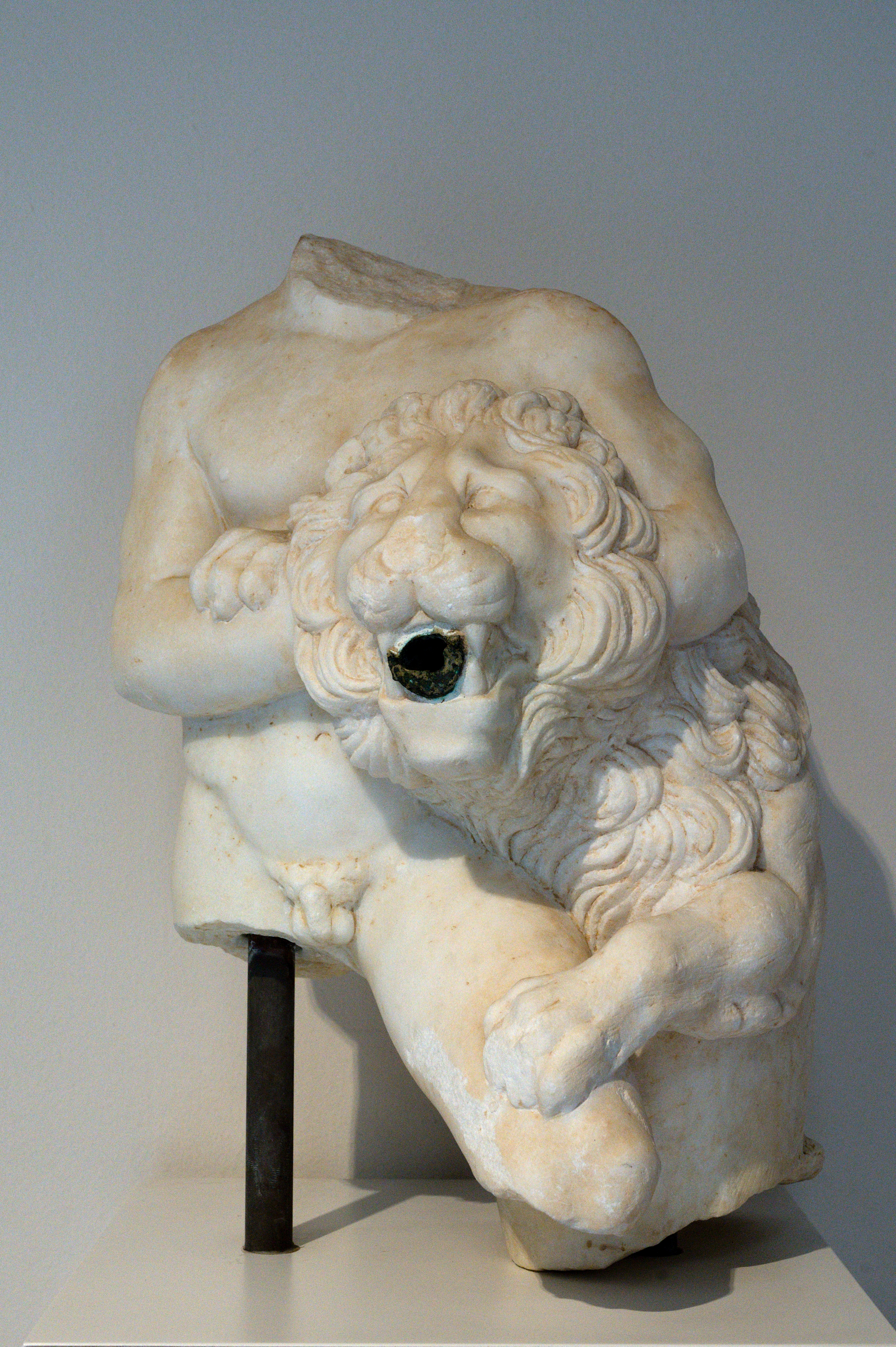
Fragmentary Roman-period statue of Heracles wrestling the Nemean lion, found at Isthmia.

The third part of Diogenes' speech (27-35) is a revisionist account of the labours of Heracles, presenting him as a paragon of the Cynic lifestyle, rather than the athletic one. Heracles, like Diogenes, was ignored in favour of flashier heroes in life, only receiving the honours he deserved after death (27-28). Heracles' physique was not the overly fleshy one of a contemporary athlete, which required a special diet and plenty of rest to maintain. Instead, he was alert and light "like a lion" (30). Such a man could not have been controlled by a non-entity like Eurystheus, who gave Heracles his labours in the traditional version of the myth (29, 34). Heracles' ability to resist hardship allowed him to easily kill luxurious tyrants like Diomedes of Thrace, Geryon, and Busiris (31-32). Heracles' resistance to pleasure allowed him to take Hippolyta's girdle (32) and meant that he had no need of the golden apples of the Hesperides (34). Prometheus was actually a sophist, who was freed from his errors by Heracles' example (33). His cremation in old age was a self-immolation intended to demonstrate his indifference to heat and cold (35). Finally, Heracles cleaned the stables of Augeas to demonstrate that he was not above disreputable work (35).

The brief conclusion (36) states that the crowd was initially swayed by Diogenes' words but then he, inspired by the story of the Augean stables with which he finished his oration, sat down and "did something disreputable" (probably defecating), and then they dismissed him as crazy and departed.

And all the sophists went back to making a ruckus, like frogs in a pond, unaware of the water snake.

— Dio Chrysostom Or. 8.36

== Analysis ==
At the time when the speech was delivered, Dio was in exile and we are probably meant to see parallels between his accounts of Diogenes and Heracles and his own situation. In particular, the inability of the mythical despot Eurystheus to truly control the wandering Heracles may have been intended as a comment on Domitian's inability to control Dio. However, Dio's adoption of the persona of Diogenes is also a method of distancing himself from the contents of his oration - "presenting advice without committing himself to it unequivocally."

Dio builds on a tradition of seeing Heracles as a model of virtue and a role model for a philosopher, which goes back to the fourth century BC. Within this tradition, Heracles was particularly closely associated with the Cynics in Roman-period literature, probably because both the mendicant Cynic and Heracles on his labours wandered throughout the world. Diogenes Laertius reports that Diogenes the Cynic had compared himself to Heracles because they both "put nothing before freedom" and Epictetus named him as the first Cynic hero. Dio also discusses Heracles as a role model in On Kingship I (52-84), where the young Heracles must choose between Royalty and Tyranny, and in On the Story of Deïaneira, where Heracles' death is a result of his failure to maintain the Cynic lifestyle.

Dio's presentation of athleticism in this oration is very negative. Jason König draws connections to negative depictions of athletic training in Lucian's Anacharsis and Seneca's Letters 15 and 80. In this oration, as in those authors, athletics is presented as an empty waste of time, which produces a 'soft' body that requires constant monitoring and is incapable of facing hardship. By contrast, in Melancomas I and II, Dio presents athletic training as a model for the Cynic's pursuit of virtue.

The ending, in which Diogenes sits down and defecates in public, strongly undercuts the main speech. This contrast between speech and framing narrative is a common feature of Dio's orations and may be part of the same distancing tactics mentioned above. Many opponents of Cynicism in the Roman period pointed to shameless behaviour like public defecation, by Cynics in general and Diogenes in particular, in their criticism of the doctrine. Dio might be suggesting that people who focus on that behaviour miss the more important doctrinal points about the virtuous life.

== Editions ==
- Hans von Arnim, Dionis Prusaensis quem uocant Chrysostomum quae exstant omnia (Berlin, 1893–1896).
- Cohoon, J. W. (1932). Dio Chrysostom, I, Discourses 1–11. Princeton: Harvard University Press, Loeb Classical Library. ISBN 9780674992832.

== Bibliography ==
- Brancacci, Aldo (2002). "Dio, Socrates, and Cynicism". In Swain, Simon (ed.). Dio Chrysostom: Politics, Letters, and Philosophy. Oxford University Press. pp. 240–260. ISBN 978-0-19-925521-4.
- Brenk, Frederick E. (2002). "Dio on the Simple and Self-Sufficient Life". In Swain, Simon (ed.). Dio Chrysostom: Politics, Letters, and Philosophy. Oxford University Press. pp. 261–278. ISBN 978-0-19-925521-4.
- König, Jason (2005). Athletics and Literature in the Roman Empire. Cambridge: Cambridge University Press. ISBN 9780521838450.
- Krueger, Derek (1996). "The Bawdy and Society: The Shamelessness of Diogenes in Roman Imperial Culture". In Branham, R. Bracht; Goulet-Cazé, Marie-Odile (eds.). The Cynics: The Cynic Movement in Antiquity and Its Legacy. University of California Press. pp. 222–239. ISBN 978-0-520-21645-7.
- Stafford, Emma (2013). Herakles. Routledge. ISBN 978-1-136-51926-0.
