= Isthmian Oration =

Isthmian Oration may refer to:

- Diogenes or the Isthmian Oration, Oration 9 by Dio Chrysostom
- Isthmian Oration on Poseidon, Oration 46 by Aelius Aristides
