= Getica (Dio) =

Book by Cassius Dio or Dio Chrysostom

- Author: Cassius Dio or Dio Chrysostom
- Language: Classical Latin or Greek
- Subject: History, military history
- Publication date: ? (100-200 AD)

Getica was a historical book about the Getae tribes of Thrace which the Suda, Jordanes, and Freculphus attribute to Cassius Dio, while Philostratus sees Dio Chrysostom as its author. No copies of the book are known to exist.

== See also ==
- Dacia
