= David Roochnik =

American philosopher

David Roochnik (born 1951) is an American philosopher and the Maria Stata professor of philosophy at Boston University.

Prior to completing his doctorate degree at Pennsylvania State University in 1995, Professor Roochnik taught at Iowa State University and Williams College. He joined the philosophy department at Boston University in 1995.

== Work ==
In his 1991 book, The Tragedy of Reason, Professor Roochnik presents an interpretation of the historical evolution of reason, or logos, as an ongoing quarrel. One camp, represented by Cleitophon, is impatient with reason's failure to culminate in a teachable techne. A second camp, represented by Socrates, insists on protrepticizing young minds to know and care for themselves despite the lack of a clearly articulated techne of self-knowledge and self-care. Descartes, argues Roochnik, is a modern representative of Cleitophon's position. Admiring the certainty achieved by the techne of mathematics, and hoping to place all knowledge on this same firm footing, Descartes places everything he can't establish with mathematical certainty into doubt. To order his life while he pursues his project, however, Descartes must adopt what he calls a "provisional morality," in which he obeys all the laws and customs of his local society. Descartes, says Roochnik, tries to make logos into a techne and, finding that techne is insufficient to order his life, "fills the void created by the absence of logos with his provisional morality." The hyper-rational realm of mathematical certainty has, as its "flipside," a realm of credulous and unquestioning acceptance of the laws and customs of society.

The modern scientific worldview with all its hope for clarity and precision, has a "flipside," a complementary set of views which it generates as its train. And this is its misology, sophistry, its abandonment of rationality in the world of human significance. There is thus a quite literal type of schizophrenia in the world bequeathed to us by the Cartesians. It is, on the one hand, hyper-rational; it seeks to extend the purview of mathematical physics throughout the universe. On the other hand, it relegates the world in which the physicist himself dwells, the unique world of humanity and its communities, to the junkpile of the irrational. We who know so much are prohibited from knowing ourselves.

== Selected publications ==
- Retrieving Aristotle in an Age of Crisis (State University of New York Press: 2013).
- Retrieving the Ancients: An Introduction to Greek Philosophy (Oxford: Blackwell, 2004).
- Beautiful City: The Dialectical Character of Plato’s Republic (Ithaca: Cornell University Press, 2003).
- Art and Wisdom: Plato’s Understanding of Techne (Pennsylvania State University Press, 1996).
- The Tragedy of Reason: Toward a Platonic Conception of Logos (Routledge 1991).
