= Euboean Oration =

2nd-century AD speech by Dio Chrysostom

The Euboean Oration or Euboicus (Ancient Greek: Εὐβοϊκὸς λόγος ἢ κυνηγὸς, romanized: euboikos logos e kynegos, lit. 'Euboean oration, or the hunter', Oration 7 in modern corpora) is a speech delivered by Dio Chrysostom in the early second century AD, dealing with the relationship between virtue and poverty and drawing a contrast between rural and urban life. The speech's name derives from the extended anecdote in the first part of the speech in which Dio describes a poor hunter whom he met after being shipwrecked on the island of Euboea. It has been treated as an important historical source for the state of the countryside and civic life in Greece under the Roman Empire.

== Summary ==
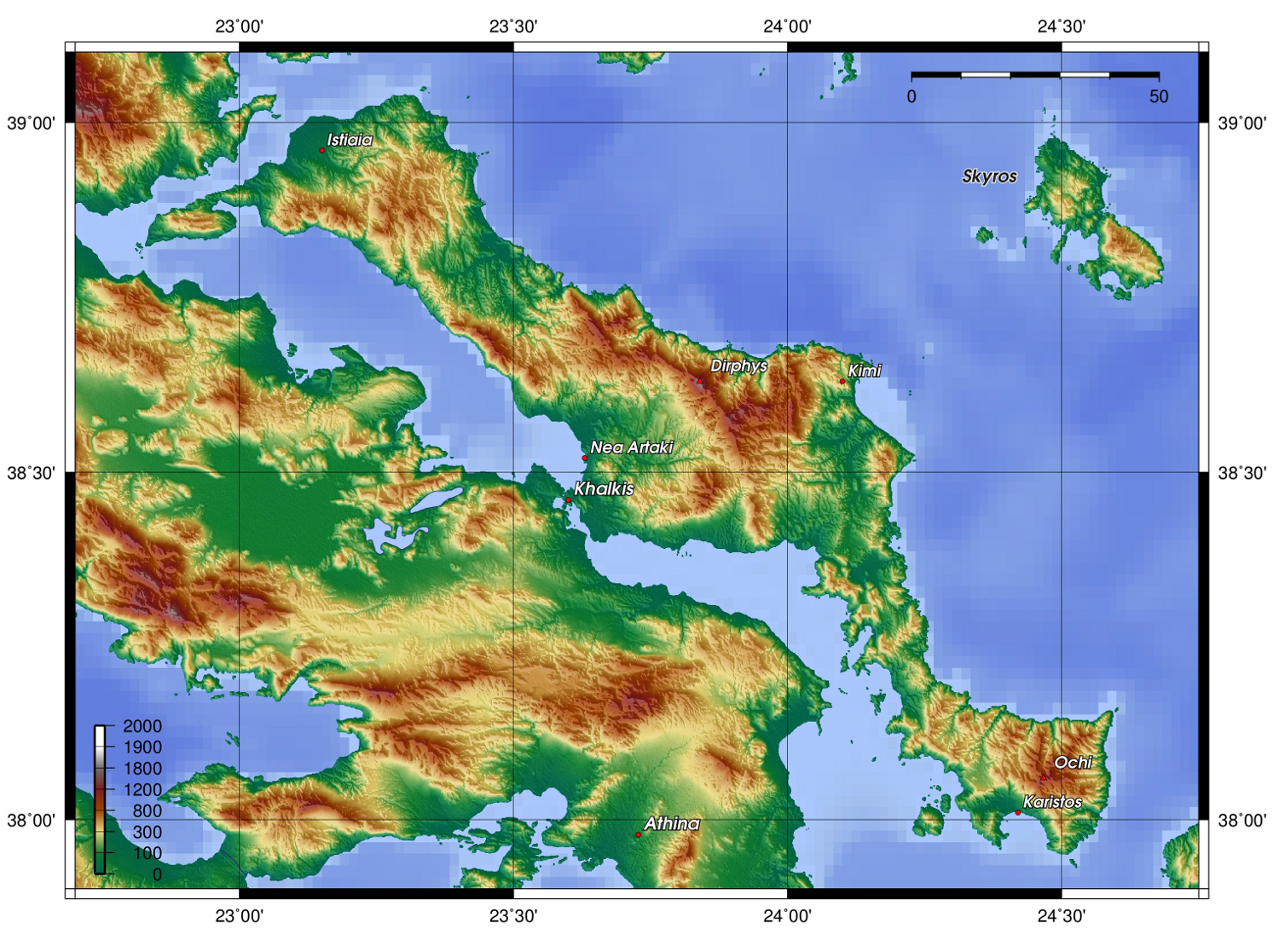
Map of Euboea; Dio claims to have been shipwrecked at the northwestern end.

The overall argument of the work is that poverty is compatible with a virtuous life. A contrast is drawn between the countryside, where it is easy to be poor and virtuous, and the city, where there are many obstacles to a virtuous life for the poor.

The speech broadly breaks down into two halves. The first half (sections 1-79) recounts how the speaker was shipwrecked on Euboea and met a rustic hunter, who tells him of his one journey to the city, where he successfully defended himself before the Assembly on charges of failing to contribute financially to city life, and offers the speaker hospitality. The narrative implicitly establishes the hunter as virtuous despite his poverty, comparing his life to that of the ideal state presented by Plato in The Republic. After a bridging section (80-103), criticising the hospitality offered by the rich characters in Homer's Odyssey, the second half (104-152) of the speech considers whether virtuous poor like the hunter can exist in an urban context, concluding that it is possible so long as they avoid taking up jobs that deform or weaken their body or that require them to behave unethically.

== Structure ==
Tale of the Hunter (1-79):

- 1-20: Account of the speaker's shipwreck and meeting with an unnamed rustic hunter
- 20-63: The hunter recounts a visit to town, where he was brought before the Assembly and charged

- 27-33: An accuser speaks against the hunter
- 33-40: Another orator speaks in defence of the hunter
- 42-53: The hunter speaks in his own defence, offering to share his meagre property with the city and claiming to be a good citizen
- 54-63: Sotades, a member of the Assembly who was rescued by the hunter when shipwrecked, speaks in his defence and the hunter is honoured by the Assembly

- 64-79: The shipwrecked speaker receives the hunter's hospitality and sees the hunter's daughter engaged to a village boy

Bridging section (80-103)

- 80-103: Criticism of the representation of hospitality in Homer's Odyssey

Virtue in the city (104-152)

- 104-126: Meditation on the possibility of virtuous poverty in the city, focussed on occupations that are incompatible with virtue
- 127-132: A digression on appropriate digressions
- 133-152: Denunciation of illicit sexual practices of the city

- 133-138: Brothels and brothelkeepers
- 139-148: Adultery and bastardy
- 149-152: Pederasty

== Editions ==
- Hans von Arnim, Dionis Prusaensis quem uocant Chrysostomum quae exstant omnia (Berlin, 1893–1896).
- Trans. J. W. Cohoon, Dio Chrysostom, I, Discourses 1–11, 1932. Harvard University Press, Loeb Classical Library:

== Bibliography ==
- Anderson, Graham (2002). "Some Uses of Storytelling in Dio". In Swain, Simon (ed.). Dio Chrysostom: Politics, Letters, and Philosophy. Oxford University Press. pp. 143–161. ISBN 978-0-19-925521-4.
- Brenk, Frederick E. (2002). "Dio on the Simple and Self-Sufficient Life". In Swain, Simon (ed.). Dio Chrysostom: Politics, Letters, and Philosophy. Oxford University Press. pp. 261–278. ISBN 978-0-19-925521-4.
- Day, J. (1951). "The Value of Dio Chrysostom's Euboean Discourse for the Economic Historian". In Coleman-Norton, P. (ed.). Studies in Roman Economic and Social History in Honor of Allan Chester Johnson. Princeton. pp. 209–235.
- Desideri, Paolo (2002). "City and Country in Dio". In Swain, Simon (ed.). Dio Chrysostom: Politics, Letters, and Philosophy. Oxford University Press. pp. 93–107. ISBN 978-0-19-925521-4.
- Ma, John (2002). "Public Speech and Community in the Euboicus". In Swain, Simon (ed.). Dio Chrysostom: Politics, Letters, and Philosophy. Oxford University Press. pp. 108–124. ISBN 978-0-19-925521-4.
- Scannapieco, Rosario (2001). "L' Euboico di Dione di Prusa: coscienza della crisi ed etica della filantropia". In Volpe, Paola; Ferrari, Franco (eds.). Ricerche su Dione di Prusa. Naples: Luciano Editore. pp. 99–153.
- Trapp, Michael (2017). Philosophy in the Roman Empire: Ethics, Politics and Society. Routledge. ISBN 978-1-351-91141-2.
