= Clitophon (dialogue) =

Dialogue, attributed to Plato, of Clitophon to Socrates

The Clitophon (Ancient Greek: Κλειτοφῶν, also transliterated as Cleitophon; Latin: Clitopho) is a 4th-century BC dialogue traditionally ascribed to Plato, though the work's authenticity is debated. It is the shortest dialogue in Plato's traditional corpus. It centers on a discussion between Clitophon and Socrates, with Socrates remaining mostly silent. Most scholarship until recently has been concerned with the authenticity rather than the actual meaning and contents of Clitophon.

== Clitophon outside of Clitophon ==
Not much is known about the historical Clitophon. What is known, outside of Plato, is from his presence in Aristophanes' The Frogs and Aristotle's Constitution of the Athenians. Depicted as a student of Euripides by Aristophanes, Clitophon is mentioned in relation to Theramenes, an Athenian politician, in both works. However while these works tell of Theramenes as Clitophon's companion, Bowe mentions Frogs and Athenian Constitution as not accurate reflections of the historical Clitophon, for only Theramenes is referenced in the works and Clitophon's character cannot be decided based solely upon his associations with Theramenes.

As is evident from Plato's Republic and Clitophon, Clitophon was a politician of Athens, active from 411–405 BC, who was an advocate of ancestral law and a companion of Thrasymachus. In the Republic, Clitophon speaks to defend Thrasymachus' position that justice is what is right to the ruling body. Clitophon sticks to this position even when Thrasymachus backs down (340a-340b). This is the only point in which Clitophon speaks in Republic, but it shows his stubbornness and faith in his own opinions. This reluctance to yield is seen in Clitophon as well.

== Summary of Clitophon ==
=== Opening ===
Socrates addresses Clitophon and confronts him on the rumor of Clitophon censuring spending time with Socrates while praising time with Thrasymachus (406a1-a4). Clitophon claims that he heard incorrectly and that while he did not praise some things of Socrates, he did praise others (406a5-a7). Socrates agrees to listen to Clitophon's side so that he might learn how to better himself by allowing himself be subject to Clitophon's criticism (407a1-a5).

=== Clitophon's imitation of Socrates' protreptic speeches ===
Clitophon starts off by reminding Socrates that he is amazed by what Socrates says and admires his exhortative speeches (407a6-a8). Clitophon continues by giving examples of speeches, which Socrates has given (407a8-b2).

==== Speech concerning wealth ====
Socrates states that fathers focus on increasing their wealth while not finding teachers of justice to instruct their sons on how to use their wealth justly (407b2-b6). He is concerned with the traditional education, which emphasizes music, gymnastics and writing, for disharmony stems from the spirit rather than lacking of measure in music (407c1-d2). The fathers respond saying that injustice is a choice rather than a lack of education. Socrates counters this asking why would someone voluntarily do something hateful to the gods. He asserts that if one is willfully unjust, then he would be willing to allow defeat in battle; therefore it is more apt to say that one is involuntarily unjust (407d5-d7). He ends this speech declaring that more care should be given towards this education of justice (407d8-e3).

Clitophon interjects at the end of the first speech to reiterate his admiration of Socrates before continuing onto the second speech (407e3-e4).

==== Speech concerning knowledge of use ====
Socrates points out that those who exercise the body are caring only for the part that is ruled, while neglecting the soul, which is what rules (407e5-e8). He goes on to say that if someone does not know how to use a tool, such as a lyre, eyes, ears and body, then that person would not know how to use that of his neighbors (407e8-408a4). Rather than using it incorrectly, it should be left alone (407e8-e9). The same concept pertains to the soul. If one does not know how to use their soul, then they should die or submit themselves to a life of slavery and those who are experts should rule (408a5-b3).

Clitophon concludes the speeches and agrees with the content of Socrates' exhortative works, for they wake people as if they were sleeping, and Clitophon has never spoken against them and never will (408c1-c4).

=== Questioning of Socrates' companions ===
Clitophon wishes to learn what is followed by these speeches by comparing justice, as if an art, to improve the soul as medicine improves health (408c4). He asks if the companions of Socrates are now able to pursue virtue further or if they are merely only able to exhort others (408d3-e2). He compares the care of the body and soul to the care of agriculture. One should not care only for the products of agriculture, but also pay heed to that which improves the body more permanently; therefore one should pay heed to the soul and virtue and seek a device able to secure such virtue (408e5-e10). Clitophon asks the companions what art improves the soul; they respond "justice" (409a2-a6) Clitophon is not satisfied, for with justice as an art, like medicine and carpentry, it must have two effects (409a7-b1). Medicine results in more physicians and health; carpentry results in more carpenters and buildings (409b2-b6). With one result being the perpetuation of the art, justice results in just men (409b6-b8). He then asks for the second result of justice (409b8-b4).

The companions give the answers "the beneficial," "the needful," "the useful," "the profitable" (409c1-c3). Clitophon finds these answers inadequate, for they are not unique to justice but are the results of all other arts as well (409c6-c7). Another answer given is "friendships" (409d4-d6) Upon elaboration, the definition of friendship is narrowed to the agreement of knowledge (409e3-e10). Again, this attribute can be given to other arts as well (410a3-a4). Finally Socrates answers that justice is to harm enemies and benefit friends, then later it seems that just men never injure anyone and do only good (410a8-b2).

=== Clitophon's defiance and final question ===
Clitophon is frustrated by these responses, or lack thereof, and claims that Socrates is unable to tell him how to attain virtue and justice (410b3-b6). This inability is either from Socrates' ignorance of how to go further than exhorting, or his unwillingness to share such knowledge with Clitophon (410b6-c6). He gives this reason for his association with Thrasymachus and others, searching for definitions and actions toward justice (410c6-c7).

Clitophon asks Socrates one last time about the nature of the body and how to care for it (410c7-d5). If Socrates is able to tell him, then Clitophon will be able to praise Socrates whole-heartedly (410e3-e5). If not, Clitophon asserts that, while Socrates is excellent at creating a desire for virtue, he is an obstacle to those whom he has already inculcated that desire (410e5-e8).

== Themes ==
=== Protreptic ===
According to Slings, the use of the protreptic in Clitophon is a parody of protreptic literature, which is designed to cause a change in behavior of the listener. Whether or not Clitophon was paraphrasing, Socrates' speeches lack congruence in content with three unrelated exhortations, taking the pattern of the Platonic trichotomy of values. Clitophon employs this pattern with exhortative motifs seen in other dialogues. The beginning of the dialogue is the accusing protreptic seen in Plato's Apology at 29d9-e3. Slings' example of the accusing protreptic is, "you care about the pseudo-Values x, y, not about true Values p, q." Clitophon's first example of Socrates' speech reflects the motifs of wealth from Plato's Euthydemus; gaining wealth has no use without knowing how to use it (280b8-d7), it is better to leave wisdom than money to your children (282a7-8, 301e1-3), not only one's children but oneself should be educated in wisdom (307c3-4). The last motif of slavery is within the second example of Socrates' speeches in which variants are seen also in Plato's Euthydemus (280e3-281e2) and Alcibiades I (117c6-e5), Xenophon's Memorabilia (4.2.25-29), Aristotle's Protrepticus (62-66). What one cannot handle should be left to others or be left alone. The use of the protreptic and protreptic motifs in Clitophon is to prove that explicit protreptic is not advantageous and instead implicit protreptic ought to be preferred.

=== Justice ===
As Slings mentions, justice is a secondary theme in Clitophon; justice is primarily used to show the ignorance of Clitophon. Clitophon depicts the concentric definitions of justice's results with the latter definition expanding upon the former until the definition is closer to the object in search and aporia, confusion or puzzlement, is reached. However, in Clitophon, aporia is reached prematurely before Socrates gives his definition. The first set of definitions of the result of justice are definitions borrowed from Republic I with some differences; Clitophon lacks "the gainful" and places "the beneficial" at the beginning of the list rather than the end. The second definition of "friendship in the cities" is a common concept in 4th century philosophical literature, but Slings counters that friendship cannot be given as a definition of the result of justice, for it is the parallel to justice. In Aristotle's Nicomachean Ethics, justice and friendship have the same subject and object; therefore they increase correspondingly (1159ab25-26, 1160a7-8). With respect to the third definition, Plato is the first to reject that to be just is to harm enemies and benefit friends. His rejection is due to Socrates' other definition that justice is benefiting everyone; however, this definition is left undeveloped. In the end, these definitions failed to fit into the criteria of an art with two results.

== Clitophon's ignorance ==
Clitophon throughout the dialogue displays his own ignorance, whether intentionally or not. Most important to understanding the dialogue is his ignorance of Socrates' speeches, methodology and his own ignorance.

As Moore points out, Clitophon does not understand Socrates' speeches. He paraphrases them, takes them out of context, and implies there was a much larger audience for the speeches than there actually would have been. There is a misrepresentation and misunderstanding of Socrates' definition of justice and the differing means through which Socrates and Clitophon view virtue and justice as being achieved, by speech and deed, respectively. It is possible that Socrates uses protreptic speeches because he sees being just as being the same as having a desire to be just; therefore justice is achieved through speech. Clitophon holds that deeds and actions need to bring about change and make one just. This clear misunderstanding of justice is an example of how Clitophon misunderstands Socrates' speeches, for Clitophon has already been given the answer for how to achieve justice.

Through not understanding his speeches, Clitophon does not understand Socrates' methods. Clitophon tries to make the protreptic speeches of Socrates effectual while in their nature they are solely meant to encourage and cause people to have a desire for justice. Clitophon misunderstands the Socratic method of elenchus, the cross-examination statements of interlocutors. Clitophon attempts to employ elenchus when he had questioned Socrates' companions, but the portrayal of his method when relating the conversation to Socrates is too one-sided with concern only for his answers and paraphrasing that of the others. This leads Bryan to label Clitophon as a pseudo-dialogue through his use of pseudo-elenchus. Having spoken with Socrates on the topic of justice it is clear that either Clitophon was not a receiver of Socrates' elenchus or he did not realize that he had been given the answer to how to achieve justice. Due to Clitophon's desire to be told what to think, this does not make him a proper interlocutor for elenchus.

The largest obstacle and most important example of Clitophon's ignorance is his ignorance of his ignorance. Slings, in his portrayals of the levels of Clitophon's character, defines Clitophon as an unabashed young man, who is defensive when provoked; this is seen in his hubristic claims to know of Socrates' speeches and methods, and his attack of Socrates. Wishing to gain the knowledge of how to attain justice for political advancement, Clitophon knows that to be told what he wants, he needs to claim aporia. However to actually experience aporia through elenchus, Clitophon needs to acknowledge ignorance and bad qualities. Clitophon remains ignorant to his bad qualities and assumes that he knows much in terms of Socrates' speeches and methodologies. This ignorance holds Clitophon back from gaining the knowledge of justice.

== Historical vs. literary Socrates ==
The character of Socrates in the dialogue causes difficulty in interpreting the dialogue and Socrates' silence. The Socrates within Clitophon is not necessarily equated with the historical Socrates. Within 4th century philosophical texts of the genre logos Sokratikos, the literary character of Socrates was prominent. The double character of Socrates in Clitophon, as Slings points out, labels Clitophon as a literary work rather than a philosophical pamphlet. The reader must detach himself or herself and read Clitophon as a fictional work. Socrates is used as a symbol of the protreptic and this causes the misinterpretations of the dialogue as well as the meaning of Socrates' silence. Socrates' character in the dialogue must be realized in his capacity as a tool of protrepsis and not as an accurate portrayal of the historical Socrates.

== Socrates' silence ==
One of the more puzzling aspects of the dialogue is Socrates' silence. Clitophon seems to be an attack on him and yet there is no rebuttal of Clitophon's remarks. What meaning, if anything, does his silence impart on the dialogue? Hayden Ausland indicates that his silence may be just a characteristic of the protreptic genre. This silence leaves the dialogue open-ended to elicit the reader to think what may have happened and reflect on what was just said. Another belief is that Socrates' silence is a pause in thinking, which continues into his speeches in Republic.

Socrates' silence also may be due to his inability to go further to teach Clitophon. As mentioned, Clitophon is ignorant of his faults and not aware of Socrates' methods at work. Socrates may not be able to do more for him. The gap between Socrates and Clitophon is illuminated and depicts the weakness of speech to not help make Clitophon understand Socrates' teachings.

As another stylistic reason, the silence is a Platonic characteristic to show what Socrates is by showing what he is not. Socrates is put in the light of Clitophon's ignorance and differences between the two are seen. Kremer notes that Clitophon is depicted as the antipoetic foil of Socrates.

Orwin suggests that this silence may be indicative of a legal study, stating that Clitophon may be a counter-Apology, in which Socrates is a defendant, which would not necessitate a response from Socrates. The dialogue begins with Socrates speaking in third person when referring to himself and Clitophon, which can be equated with a legal statement. What follows would then be the defense of Clitophon.

An important note is that Socrates claimed that he would reply, for he had stated that he would listen to Clitophon's complaints and try to learn from them. Along the same thought, Socrates is searching for the truth of people's perceptions of him and his teachings. A characteristic of Platonic dialogues is for Socrates to listen. In Clitophon, he is acting as the audience for Clitophon, who is taking on the role of the frank speaker. Socrates is also setting a precedent for the correct behavior when someone is speaking, something which Clitophon himself does not do well.

== Authenticity ==
Many ancient authors, such as Diogenes Laërtius, who stated that it was taken straight from the hand of Plato, had cited Clitophon. 1491 Ficino translations and the 1513 Aldine Press editions of Plato's works say that Clitophon was not by Plato. These statements derived from Greek manuscripts, which did not clearly state the author of Clitophon. In the 19th century, scholars began to label Clitophon as spurious because it did not fit their subjective interpretation of what qualifies as Platonic works. Attempts to defend the authenticity have sprung up, but among the defenses there is still much disagreement over classifying the work as fragmentary, completed and independent, or related to Republic.

=== Spurious ===
The rejection of Clitophon depends on both thematic and philological reasons. Heidel and others believed that the vocabulary used in Clitophon would not have been used by Plato; however, that argument has been defeated by Brünnecke, Kester and Grube. Plato's use of language is too varied and interpretations of style are too subjective to be able to use language as a base from which to deem Clitophon unauthentic.

Another argument is based on the anti-Socratic sentiment. It is difficult at first to answer why Socrates would be criticized by his student and follower. Schleiermacher was one of the first to lead people to characterize Clitophon as spurious; while he acknowledges its listing in the Platonic corpus, he could not reconcile the non-Socratic sensitivity.

If Clitophon is spurious, then who would have written this dialogue? Slings had originally noted that due to the similarity of writing to that of Plato's, it must have been written by a student of Plato. Schleiermacher believed it to have been written by a contemporary school of rhetoric, which wrote this dialogue as an attack against Socrates. It is difficult to attribute a work so similar in style to Plato's to another person. Slings in his later work changed his thesis on the authorship and claimed that it is easier to accept as a work of Plato than to postulate an anonymous author similar to Plato's skill.

=== Genuine work of Plato ===
Yxem was the first to question the Aldine editions' of 1513 placement of Clitophon. As already mentioned, there are ancient writers who have cited Clitophon and indicated no suspicions of its authenticity. Grote argued that it safer to accept this work as one of Plato rather than ascribe it to another.

==== Plato's attack on Antisthenes ====
Brunnecke, Kester and Souilhe believe this dialogue to be an attack on Antisthenes. Based upon Diogenes Laërtius crediting Antisthenes with three books of protreptic works in his Lives and Opinions of Eminent Philosophers vi 16, Clitophon may well be a criticism of Antisthenes. The author of Clitophon uses one of Antisthenes' protreptic works and summarizes its content. Throughout Clitophon, Plato disparages the use of protreptic speeches. This could easily be an answer to why Plato seems to be anti-Socratic; he wishes to indirectly denounce Antisthenes via Socrates.

==== Fragment or draft of Plato ====
Many think that Clitophon is a fragment or draft written by Plato. Grube believes Clitophon to have been a draft of Plato as a reflection of his dissatisfaction with his earlier methods, a tone seen in the middle period of Plato's works, but was abandoned as is attested to in its lack of revision. Bury believed that, if indeed it was written by Plato, Clitophon would be a fragmentary preface of Republic, a stance held by Shorey and Grote. However, Slings makes note that no ancient author ever indicated that Clitophon was incomplete or unfinished. In Parallel Lives, Plutarch, fully aware of Clitophon, mentions that Plato's life ended before finishing his work (32.2), namely Critias, not Clitophon; this indicates that Clitophon was finished in the opinion of ancient authors.

==== Finished work of Plato related to Republic ====
Discussed previously, Grube thought Clitophon was not necessarily a finished work, but one associated with Republic. Thrasyllus of Mendes, Tiberius' astrologer, arranged Clitophon within the Platonic corpus including Republic, Timaeus, and Critias. Grube thought it to be the criticism of Republic I and the rest of the Republic was a response to Clitophon. Annas defends this stance with her belief that the remainder of Republic, being mostly a monologue by Socrates, to be the response to the silence of Socrates. Also, with the views of justice in Republic I, Clitophon is a natural reaction to Republic I, with Clitophon seeking out Thrasymachus. With Clitophon and Socrates at odds within Republic without any explanation, Orwin indicated that Clitophon might be the missing confrontation between Socrates and Clitophon. However, there are difficulties when attempting to understand Clitophon in relation to Republic, for it is unclear where Clitophon should be placed. It is possible that Clitophon was written after Republic and Clitophon only draws definitions from Republic. But regardless of when it was written, it can still be read as an introduction to Republic, and only completed by it.

==== Independent completed work by Plato ====
Although there are clear ties to Republic thematically in terms of the discussions on justice, Clitophon has very different themes concerning philosophical methods, resulting in its classification as an independent work in its own right. Above, the identification of Clitophon as a legal study has already been mentioned with no connections to another dialogue. On the other hand, Slings labels Clitophon as a short dialogue according to Müller's standards. Clitophon is used on this view to criticize protrepsis, for the colleagues of Socrates were only able to gain slogans and motifs surrounding justice rather than a full understanding of it. Clitophon is also a warning of how to not read protreptical dialogues and of the dangers of relying on these dialogues to gain insight. Clitophon did not want to think for himself, but rather to be told what to think by Socrates. As a replacement to protreptic speech, Slings proposes that Clitophon champions elenchus as the mode through which to attain virtue and justice by reaching aporia.

== See also ==
- The Tragedy of Reason
