= Dio Chrysostom =

Greek orator, writer, philosopher and historian (c. 40 – c. 115)

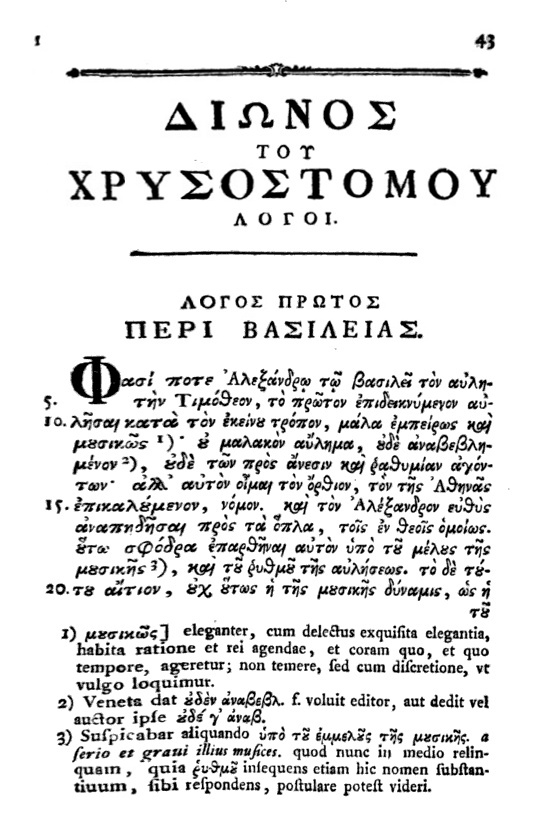
Orations of Dio Chrysostom edited by Johann Jakob Reiske, 1784. Oration 1, ΠΕΡΙ ΒΑΣΙΛΕΙΑΣ (On Kingship)

Dio Chrysostom (/ˈdiːoʊ ˈkrɪsəstəm, krɪˈsɒstəm/; Ancient Greek: Δίων Χρυσόστομος Dion Chrysostomos), Dio of Prusa or Cocceianus Dio (c. 40 – c. 115 AD), was a Greek orator, writer, philosopher and historian of the Roman Empire in the 1st century AD. Eighty of his Discourses (or Orations; Λόγοι) are extant, as well as a few letters, a mock essay Encomium on Hair, and a few other fragments. His sobriquet Chrysostom comes from the Greek chrysostomos, which literally means "golden-mouthed".

== Life ==
He was born at Prusa (now Bursa), in the Roman province of Bithynia (now part of northwestern Turkey). His father, Pasicrates, seems to have bestowed great care on his son Dio's education. At first he lived in Prusa, where he held important offices, composed speeches and other rhetorical and sophistical essays, and studied philosophy. The Stoic and Platonist philosophies, however, appear to have had the greatest charms for him, particularly the stoicism of Musonius Rufus.

He went to Rome during Vespasian's reign (69–79 AD), by which time he seems to have got married and had a child. He became a critic of the Emperor Domitian, who banished him from Rome, Italy, and Bithynia in 82 for advising one of the Emperor's conspiring relatives. He claims that, on the advice of the Delphic oracle, he put on the clothes of a beggar, and with nothing in his pocket but a copy of Plato's Phaedo and Demosthenes's On the False Embassy, he lived the life of a Cynic philosopher, undertaking a journey to the countries in the north and east of the Roman Empire. He thus visited Thrace, Mysia, Scythia, and the country of the Getae, giving orations.

He was a friend of Nerva, and when Domitian was murdered in 96 AD, Dio used his influence with the army stationed on the frontier in favour of Nerva. Under Emperor Nerva's reign, his exile was ended, and he was able to return home to Prusa. He adopted the surname Cocceianus, reflecting Nerva's nomen, Cocceius. Dio addressed his four Orations on Kingship to Nerva's successor, Trajan, and appears to have known the Emperor personally, claiming "I am perhaps as well acquainted with your character as anyone." He knew Apollonius of Tyana and Euphrates of Tyre. In his later life Dio had considerable status in Prusa, and Pliny the Younger reports that he was involved in a lawsuit about a civic building project around 111. He probably died a few years later.

== Writings ==
Dio Chrysostom was part of the Second Sophistic school of Greek philosophers, which reached its peak in the early 2nd century during the Antonine period. He was considered one of the most eminent of the Greek rhetoricians and sophists by the ancients who wrote about him, such as Philostratus, Synesius, and Photius. This is confirmed by the eighty orations of his which are still extant, and which were the only ones known in the time of Photius. These orations appear to be written versions of his oral teaching, and are like essays on political, moral, and philosophical subjects. They include four orations on Kingship addressed to Trajan on the virtues of a sovereign; four on the character of Diogenes of Sinope, on the troubles to which men expose themselves by deserting the path of Nature, and on the difficulties which a sovereign has to encounter; essays on slavery and freedom; on the means of attaining eminence as an orator; political discourses addressed to various towns which he sometimes praises and sometimes blames, but always with moderation and wisdom; on subjects of ethics and practical philosophy, which he treats in a popular and attractive manner; and lastly, orations on mythical subjects and show-speeches. He argued strongly against permitting prostitution. Two orations of his (37 and 64) are now assigned to Favorinus. Besides the eighty orations, fragments of fifteen others survive, as well as five letters under his name.

He wrote many other philosophical and historical works, none of which survives. One of these works, Getica, was on the Getae, which the Suda incorrectly attributes to Dio Cassius.

== Editions ==
=== Editions and translations of the full oeuvre ===
- Arnim, H. von, ed. (1893–1896). Dionis Prusaensis quem uocant Chrysostomum quae exstant omnia. Vol. I–II. Berlin: Weidmann.
- Dio Chrysostom (1932). Cohoon, J. W. (ed.). Discourses 1–11. Vol. I. Cambridge, MA. – London: Harvard University Press.
- Dio Chrysostom (1939). Cohoon, J. W. (ed.). Discourses 12–30. Vol. II. Cambridge, MA. – London: Harvard University Press.
- Dio Chrysostom (1940). Cohoon, J. W.; Crosby, H. L. (eds.). Discourses 31–36. Vol. III. Cambridge, MA. – London: Harvard University Press.
- Dio Chrysostom (1946). Crosby, H. L. (ed.). Discourses 37–60. Vol. IV. Cambridge, MA. – London: Harvard University Press.
- Dio Chrysostom (1951). Crosby, H. L. (ed.). Discourses 61–80. Fragments. Letters. Vol. V. Cambridge, MA. – London: Harvard University Press.
- Dion Chrysostomos (1967). Elliger, W. (ed.). Sämtliche Reden. Zürich: Artemis Verlag.

=== Editions, translations and commentaries of single works ===
- Dio von Prusa (2009). Nesselrath, H.-G.; Hahn, J.; Ramelli, I. L. E.; Amato, E.; Fornaro, S.; Borg, B.; Burri, R.; Schamp, J. (eds.). Der Philosoph und sein Bild. Tübingen: Mohr Siebeck. ISBN 978-3-16-149440-6.
- Dion Chrysostome (2006). Bost-Pouderon, C. (ed.). Trois discours aux villes (Orr. 33–35). Vol. I–II. Salerno: Helios.
- Dion de Pruse (2011). Bost-Pouderon, C. (ed.). Oeuvres (Or. XXXIII–XXXVI). Paris: Les Belles Lettres.
- Dion von Prusa (2012). Hehm, W.; Lehmann, G. A.; Engster, D.; Gall, D.; Goette, H. R.; Herrmann-Otto, E.; Zehnpfennig, B. (eds.). Armut – Arbeit – Menschenwürde. Die Euböische Rede. Tübingen: Mohr Siebeck. doi:10.1628/978-3-16-156436-9. ISBN 978-3-16-156436-9.
- Dion von Prusa (2024). Nieschler, A. (ed.). Der Borysthenitikos. Stuttgart: Franz Steiner. ISBN 978-3-515-13681-5.
- Dione di Prusa (2003). Vagnone, G. (ed.). Troiano – or. XI. Rome: Edizioni dell'Ateneo. ISBN 9788884760616.
- Dione di Prusa (2012). Vagnone, G. (ed.). Orazioni I-II-III-IV ("Sulla regalità"). Orazione LXII ("Sulla regalità e sulla tirannide"). Rome: Accademia Nazionale dei Lincei. ISBN 9788821810435.
