= Hans von Arnim =

German-Austrian classical philologist (1859–1931)

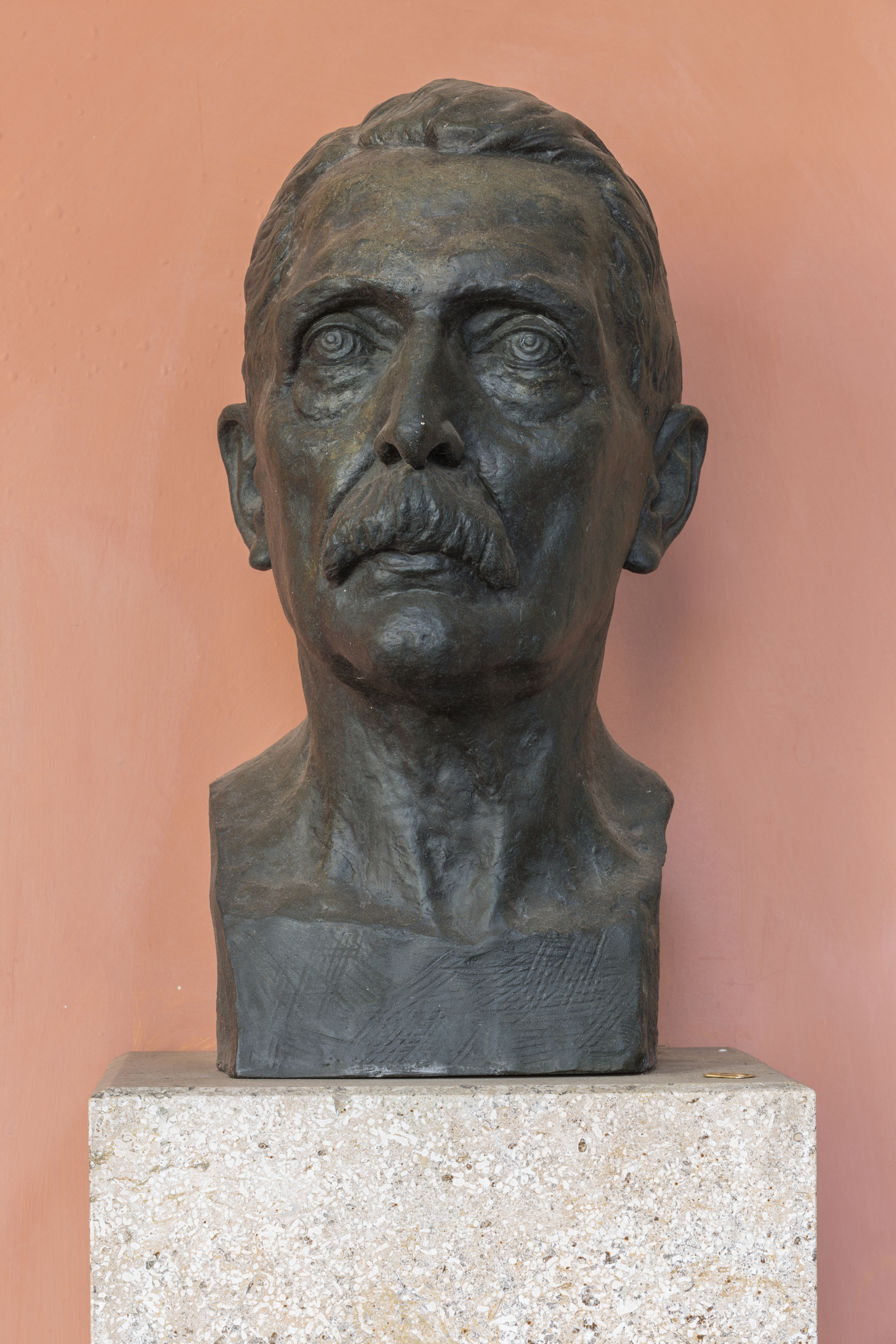
Bust of Hans von Arnim in the Arkadenhof, University of Vienna.

Hans von Arnim (14 September 1859, Groß Fredenwalde – 26 May 1931, Vienna) was a German-Austrian classical philologist, who specialized in studies of Plato and Aristotle.

He studied classical philology at the University of Greifswald as a pupil of Ulrich von Wilamowitz-Moellendorf. From 1881 to 1888 he worked as a schoolteacher in Elberfeld and Bonn, then obtained his habilitation in 1888 from the University of Halle. In 1893 he became a full professor at Rostock, then in 1900 was appointed chair of Greek philology at the University of Vienna as a successor to Theodor Gomperz. In 1914 he relocated as a professor to the newly founded University of Frankfurt, and in 1921 returned to the University of Vienna.

He was elected a foreign member of the Royal Netherlands Academy of Arts and Sciences in 1919.

== Selected works ==
- Stoicorum Veterum Fragmenta. 4 volumes, Leipzig 1903–05, 1924 – Fragments of the ancient Stoics. (Volume IV, 1924 : index, Maximilian Adler).
- Sprachliche Forschungen zur Chronologie der Platonischen Dialoge, 1912 – Linguistic research on the chronology of the Platonic dialogues.
- Platos Jugenddialoge und die Entstehungszeit des Phaidros, 1914 – Plato's "youth dialogues" and the origin of Phaedrus.
- Xenophons Memorabilien und Apologie des Sokrates, 1923 – Xenophon's "Memorabilia" and "Apology" (Socratic dialogues).
- Die drei aristotelischen Ethiken, 1924 – The three Aristotelian ethics.
- Zur Entstehungsgeschichte der aristotelischen Politik, 1924 – On the origin of Aristotelian politics.
- Die Entstehung der Gotteslehre des Aristoteles, 1931 – The emergence of Aristotle's doctrine of God.
- Zwölf Tragödien des Euripides, 2 volumes 1931 (edition of 12 tragedies by Euripides).
