= Attalus =

Attalus or Attalos may refer to:

== People ==
- Several members of the Attalid dynasty of Pergamon
  - Attalus I, ruled 241 BC–197 BC
  - Attalus II Philadelphus, ruled 160 BC–138 BC
  - Attalus III, ruled 138 BC–133 BC
- Attalus, father of Philetaerus the founder of the Attalid dynasty of Pergamon
- Attalus, father of Attalus I of Pergamon
- Attalus (general) (390–336 BC), courtier and general of Philip II of Macedonia
- Attalus (son of Andromenes) (fl. 330–317 BC), general of Alexander the Great and Perdiccas
- Attalus of Rhodes (fl. 2nd century BC), astronomer, contemporary of Hipparchus
- Attalus (Stoic) (fl. 25 AD), Stoic philosopher and teacher of Seneca
- Attalus (sophist), (fl. 2nd century) sophist, son of Polemon of Laodicea
- Statilius Attalus (fl. 2nd century), court physician of the emperor Marcus Aurelius
- Priscus Attalus (fl. 409–416), Roman senator who was proclaimed emperor twice by the Visigoths
- St Attalus, Sicilian saint and protomartyr, bishop of Catania
- Attalus (Marcomanni), King of Marcomanni
- Attalus (mythology) (also called Perdix or Talos), mythical nephew of Daedalus credited as the inventor of the potter's wheel, saw, and drawing compass
- Attalus (sculptor), statuary of ancient Greece whose time is unknown

== Other uses ==
- Attalus (band), an American rock band formed in 2010
- Attalus, a genus of beetles in the family Melyridae
- Attalus (UAV), a Greek anti-tank loitering munition
