= Claudius Rufinus Sophistes =

2nd-century Roman philosopher and general

Claudius Rufinus Sophistes was a sophist of ancient Rome, of the Second Sophistic tradition. He lived in Smyrna in Asia Minor during the 2nd and 3rd centuries CE. In his earliest references, he is called simply "Rufinus", then, starting around 200 "Claudius Rufinus", and from about 208 onwards, "Claudius Rufinus Sophistes".

Rufinus was a respected member of the community, having come from a long line of respected sophists. He had been granted an exemption from all taxes, duties, and service, by the Roman emperor, and was known to be a generous benefactor, donating several public buildings.

He was elected strategos of Smyrna during the reign of Gordian I, and he features prominently on the coinage of this city during this period. As a sophist and rhetor, he was the teacher of the sophist Hermocrates of Phocaea. He was also possibly the dedicatee of the book Sophistic Preparations by Phrynichus Arabius.

He also features in the story of the martyrdom of Pionius, as one of Pionius's questioners.

When he died, he was honored as an extremely prominent citizen, with a public funeral, commemorative games, and a sumptuous tomb.
