= Damis =

Ancient Greek philosopher

Damis (Greek: Δάμις) was a student and lifelong companion of Apollonius of Tyana, the famous Neopythagorean philosopher and teacher who lived in the early 1st up to the early 2nd century AD.

== Life ==
All that is known about Damis comes from Apollonius' biographer Philostratus who wrote his Life of Apollonius of Tyana between 217 and 238. Some scholars such as Charles Bigg believed that Damis never existed. F.C. Conybeare, however, points out the extreme and unnecessary skepticism of this theory.

E. Rabinovitch even advocates a high probability of the real existence of Damis' notebooks. It is possible that Philostratus did use a biography of Apollonius by Damis, who was however, not trustworthy (that is, he was like the so-called aretalogi, sought to embellish the life of his master).

According to Philostratus, Apollonius met Damis in a city which Philostratus calls "Old Ninos", which from its location cannot be Nineveh, but is in fact the "holy city" of Hierapolis Bambyce (Manbij) in Syria. Damis admired Apollonius so much that he became his disciple, and kept a record of Apollonius' actions and sayings, the so-called Memoirs (or Diary) of Damis. These notes came into the possession of the empress Julia Domna, and it was she who commissioned Philostratus to write a biography of Apollonius, the extant Life of Apollonius of Tyana. That's what Philostratus asserts.
