= Marjorie Livingston =

British spiritualist author

- Born: 1893
- Occupation: Writer

Marjorie Prout Livingston (1893 – ?) was a British spiritualist author who wrote works of spirit writing and novels about Atlantis.

Her The New Nuctemeron (The Twelve Hours of Apollonius of Tyana) (1930) was purported to be written in six weeks while channeling the ancient Greek philosopher Apollonius of Tyana, who recounted his teachings that were lost with the burning of the Library of Alexandria. It featured a preface by Arthur Conan Doyle. A reviewer in Ancient Egypt quipped that "Poor Apollonius has evidently fallen into bad company in the underworld." She wrote a series of books expounding on life and the afterlife and then turned to novels on similar themes. The Future of Mr. Purdew (1936) features a man confronted with the afterlife while Moloch (1942) is about a search for the lair of the god Moloch. Her Karmic Destiny trilogy - Island Sonata (1944), Muted Strings (1946) and Delphic Echo (1948) - features the fall of Atlantis and follows the survivors reincarnated through the generations in ancient Egypt and Greece.

== Bibliography ==
- The New Nuctemeron (The Twelve Hours of Apollonius of Tyana). London: Rider &. Co., 1930.
- The Harmony of the Spheres. 1931.
- The Elements of Heaven. London: Wright and Brown, 1932.
- The Outline of Existence. 1933.
- The Future of Mr. Purdew: A Novel. London: Andrew Dakers, 1936.
- Moloch. London: Andrew Dakers, 1942.
- Island Sonata. London: Andrew Dakers, 1944.
- Muted Strings. London: Andrew Dakers, 1946.
- Delphic Echo. London: Andrew Dakers, 1948.
