= Apollonius of Tyana =

Greek Neopythagorean philosopher (c.15–100)

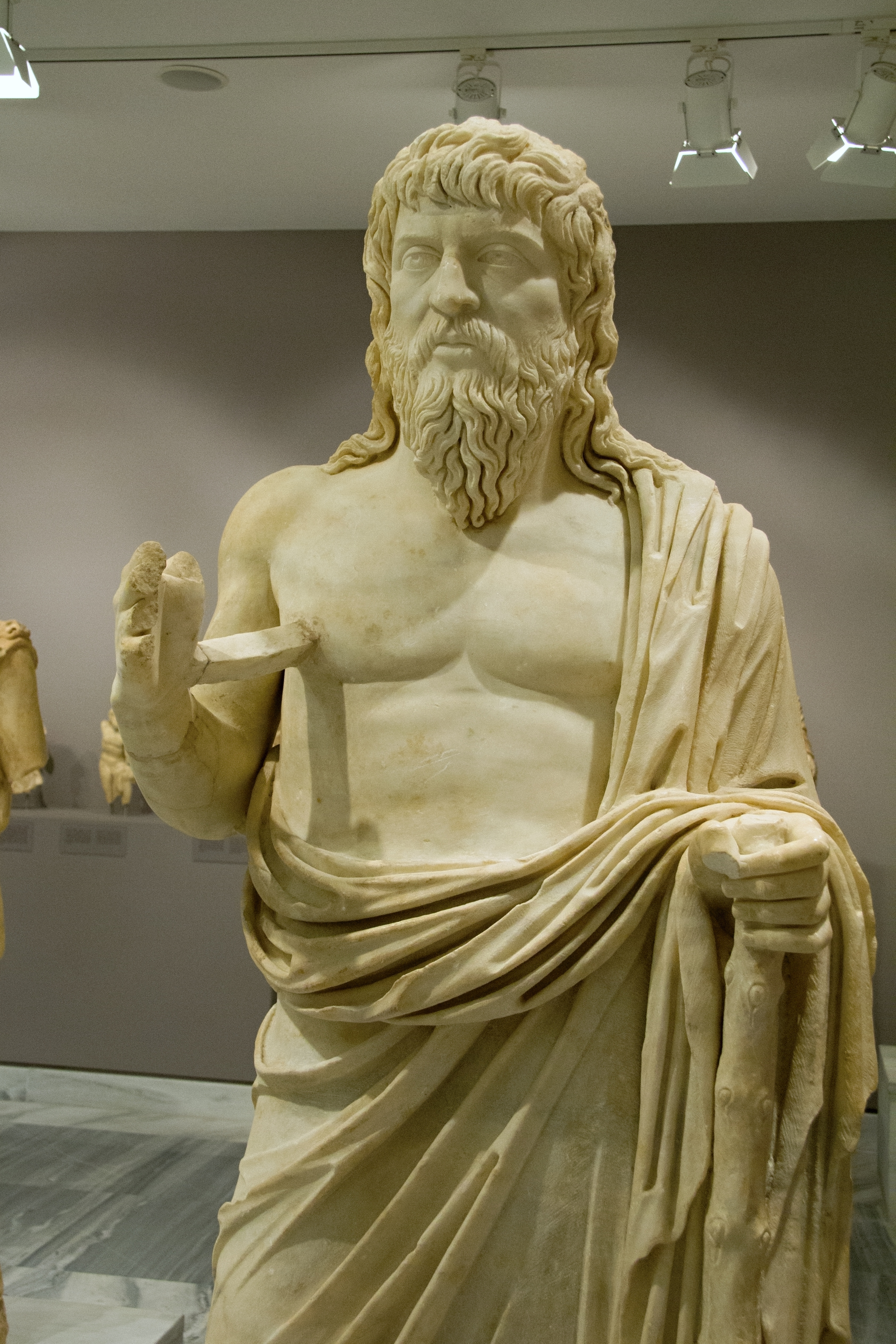
- A wandering philosopher, probably representing Apollonius of Tyana, who lived a part of his life in Crete and died there. Found in Gortyn (late 2nd century AD), now in Heraklion Archaeological Museum, Crete.
- Born: c. AD 15 (disputed); Tyana, Cappadocia, Anatolia (Roman Empire) (now Kemerhisar, Niğde, Turkey)
- Died: c. AD 100 (aged c. 85)
- Occupations: Sage, orator, philosopher
- Known for: Divination, miracle-work

Apollonius of Tyana (Ancient Greek: Ἀπολλώνιος ὁ Τυανεύς; c. AD 15 – c. 100) was a Greek philosopher and religious leader from the town of Tyana, Cappadocia in Roman Anatolia, who spent his life travelling and teaching in the Middle East, North Africa and India. He is a central figure in Neopythagoreanism and was one of the most famous "miracle workers" of his day.

His exceptional personality and his mystical way of life, which was regarded as exemplary, impressed his contemporaries and had a lasting cultural influence. Numerous legends surrounding him and accounts of his life are contained in the extensive Life of Apollonius. Many of the ancient legends of Apollonius consist of numerous reports about miracles that he was said to have performed as a wandering sage with his lifelong companion Damis.

He was tried for allegedly having used magic as a means of conspiring against the emperor; after his conviction and subsequent death-penalty, his followers believed he underwent heavenly ascension. Most modern scholars of antiquity agree that Apollonius existed historically.

== Life dates ==
Apollonius was born into a respected and wealthy aristocratic Greek household. His primary biographer, Philostratus the Elder (c. 170 – c. 247), places him c. 3 BC – c. AD 97, however, the Roman historian Cassius Dio (c. AD 155 – c. 235) writes that Apollonius was in his 40s or 50s in the 90s AD, from which the scholar Maria Dzielska gives a birth year of about AD 40.

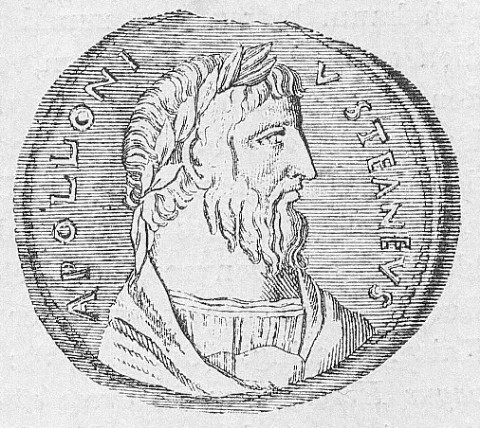
A medallion from the Palmyrene Empire depicting Apollonius, 2nd century AD

== Sources ==
The earliest and by far the most detailed source is the Life of Apollonius of Tyana, a lengthy, novelistic biography written by the sophist Philostratus at the request of empress Julia Domna, wife of Septimius Severus. She died in AD 217, and he completed it after her death, probably in the 220s or 230s AD. Philostratus's account shaped the image of Apollonius for posterity. To some extent it is a valuable source because it contains data from older writings that were available to Philostratus but disappeared later on. Among these works are an excerpt (preserved by Eusebius) from On Sacrifices, and certain alleged letters of Apollonius. The sage may have actually written some of these works, along with the no-longer extant Life of Pythagoras. At least two biographical sources that Philostratus used are lost: a book by the imperial secretary Maximus describing Apollonius's activities in Maximus's home city of Aegaeae in Aeolis and a biography by a certain Moiragenes. There also survives, separately from the life by Philostratus, a collection of letters of Apollonius, but at least some of these seem to be spurious.

One of the essential sources Philostratus claimed to know are the "memoirs" (or "diary") of Damis, an acolyte and companion of Apollonius. Some scholars claim that the notebooks of Damis were an invention of Philostratus, while others think it could have been a real book forged by someone else and naively used by Philostratus. Philostratus describes Apollonius as a wandering teacher of philosophy and miracle-worker who was mainly active in Greece and Asia Minor but also traveled to Italy, Spain, and North Africa, and even to Mesopotamia, India, and Ethiopia. In particular, he tells lengthy stories of Apollonius entering the city of Rome in disregard of emperor Nero's ban on philosophers, and later on being summoned, as a defendant, to the court of Domitian, where he defied the emperor in blunt terms. He had allegedly been accused of conspiring against the emperor, performing human sacrifice, and predicting a plague by means of magic. Philostratus implies that upon his death, Apollonius of Tyana entered heaven.

How much of this can be accepted as historical truth depends largely on the extent to which modern scholars trust Philostratus, and in particular on whether they believe in the reality of Damis. Some of these scholars contend that Apollonius never came to Western Europe and was virtually unknown there until the 3rd century AD, when Empress Julia Domna, who was herself from the province of Syria, decided to popularize him and his teachings in Rome. For that purpose, so these same scholars believe, she commissioned Philostratus to write the biography, in which Apollonius is exalted as a fearless sage with supernatural powers, even greater than Pythagoras. This view of Julia Domna's role in the making of the Apollonius legend gets some support from the fact that her son Caracalla worshipped him, and her grandnephew emperor Severus Alexander may have done so as well.

Apollonius was also a well-known figure in the Islamic world, being referred to by the name Balinus. (Note: Brief discussions of eight Arabic texts attributed to Apollonius may be found in Weisser 1980, pp. 28–39.)

== Biography ==
=== Historical facts ===
With the exception of the Adana Inscription from the 3rd or 4th century AD, little can be derived from sources other than Philostratus.

The Adana Inscription has been translated by C.P. Jones as: "This man, named after Apollo, and shining forth from Tyana, extinguished the faults of men. The tomb in Tyana (received) his body, but in truth, heaven received him so that he might drive out the pains of men (or: drive pains from among men)." It is thought to have been brought from Cilicia, perhaps Aegae (Cilicia). However, Miroslav Marcovich translates part of the text as: "Sure enough, Apollonius was born in Tyana, but the full truth is that he was a heaven-sent sage and healer, a new Pythagoras."

According to James Francis, "the most that can be said ... is that Apollonius appears to have been a wandering ascetic/philosopher/wonderworker of a type common to the eastern part of the early empire." What we can safely assume is that he was indeed a Pythagorean and as such, in conformity with the Pythagorean tradition, opposed animal sacrifice and lived on a frugal, strictly vegetarian diet. A minimalist view is that he spent his entire life in the cities of his native Asia Minor (Turkey) and of northern Syria, in particular his home town of Tyana, Ephesus, Aegae and Antioch, though the letters suggest wider travels, and there seems no reason to deny that, like many wandering philosophers, he at least visited Rome. As for his philosophical convictions, we have an interesting, probably authentic fragment of one of his writings (On sacrifices), in which he expresses his view that God, who is the most beautiful being, cannot be influenced by prayers or sacrifices and has no wish to be worshipped by humans, but can be reached by a spiritual procedure involving nous (intellect), because he himself is pure nous, and nous is the greatest faculty of humankind.

=== Miracles ===
Philostratus implies on one occasion that Apollonius had extra-sensory perception (book VIII, chapter XXVI). When emperor Domitian was murdered on 18 September AD 96, Apollonius was said to have witnessed the event in Ephesus "about midday" on the day it happened in Rome, and told those present, "Take heart, gentlemen, for the tyrant has been slain this day ...". Both Philostratus and renowned historian Cassius Dio report this incident, probably on the basis of an oral tradition. Both state that the philosopher welcomed the deed as praiseworthy tyrannicide.

=== Journey to India ===
Philostratus devoted two-and-a-half of the eight books of his Life of Apollonius (1.19–3.58) to the description of a journey of his hero to India. It's possible that the sage of Tyana indeed traveled to India, and it's also "entirely plausible" that he was attributed with this journey even before Philostratus.

According to Philostratus' Life, en route to the Far East, Apollonius reached Hierapolis Bambyce (Manbij) in Syria (not Nineveh, as some scholars believed), where he met Damis, a native of that city who became his lifelong companion. Pythagoras, whom the Neo-Pythagoreans regarded as an exemplary sage, was believed to have traveled to India. Hence such a feat made Apollonius look like a good Pythagorean who spared no pains in his efforts to discover the sources of oriental piety and wisdom. As some details in Philostratus' account of the Indian adventure seem incompatible with known facts, modern scholars are inclined to dismiss the whole story as a fanciful fabrication, but not all of them rule out the possibility that the Tyanean actually did visit India. Philostratus has him meet Phraotes, the Indo-Parthian king of Taxila, a city located in northern Ancient India in what is now northern Pakistan, around AD 46. And the description that Philostratus provides of Taxila comports with modern archaeological excavations at the ancient site.

What seemed to be independent evidence showing that Apollonius was known in India has now been proven a forgery. In two Sanskrit texts quoted by Sanskritist Vidhushekhara Bhattacharya in 1943 he appears as "Apalūnya", in one of them together with Damis (called "Damīśa"), it is claimed that Apollonius and Damis were Western yogis, who later on were converted to the correct Advaita philosophy. Some have believed that these Indian sources derived their information from a Sanskrit translation of Philostratus' work (which would have been a most uncommon and amazing occurrence), or even considered the possibility that it was really an independent confirmation of the historicity of the journey to India. Only in 1995 were the passages in the Sanskrit texts proven to be interpolations by a late 19th-century forger.

== Writings ==
Several writings and many letters have been ascribed to Apollonius, but some of them are lost; others have only been preserved in parts or fragments of disputed authenticity. Porphyry and Iamblichus refer to a biography of Pythagoras by Apollonius, which has not survived; it is also mentioned in the Suda. Apollonius wrote a treatise, On sacrifices, of which only a short, probably authentic fragment has come down to us.

Philostratus' Life and the anthology assembled by Joannes Stobaeus contain purported letters of Apollonius. Some of them are cited in full, others only partially. There is also an independently transmitted collection of letters preserved in medieval manuscripts. It is difficult to determine what is authentic and what not. Some of the letters may have been forgeries or literary exercises assembled in collections which were already circulated in the 2nd century AD. It has been asserted that Philostratus himself forged a considerable part of the letters he inserted into his work; others were older forgeries available to him.

== Impact ==
=== Antiquity ===
In the 2nd century the satirist Lucian of Samosata was a sharp critic of Neo-Pythagoreanism. After AD 180 he wrote a pamphlet wherein he attacked Alexander of Abonoteichus, a student of one of Apollonius's students, as a charlatan and suggested that the whole school was based on fraud. From this we can infer that Apollonius really had students and that his school survived at least until Lucian's time. One of Philostratus's foremost aims was to oppose this view. Although he related various miraculous feats of Apollonius, he emphasized at the same time that his hero was not a magician but a serious philosopher and a champion of traditional Greek values.

When Emperor Aurelian conducted his military campaign against the Palmyrene Empire, he captured Tyana in AD 272. According to the Historia Augusta he abstained from destroying the city after having a vision of Apollonius admonishing him to spare the innocent citizens.

In Late Antiquity talismans made by Apollonius appeared in several cities of the Eastern Roman Empire, as if they were sent from heaven. They were magical figures and columns erected in public places, meant to protect the cities from afflictions. The great popularity of these talismans was a challenge to the Christians. Some Byzantine authors condemned them as sorcery and the work of demons, others admitted that such magic was beneficial; none of them claimed that it didn't work.

In the Western Roman Empire, Sidonius Apollinaris was a Christian admirer of Apollonius in the 5th century. He produced a Latin translation of Philostratus's Life, which is lost.

=== The Middle Ages ===
During the medieval period, a number of works related to Hermetic philosophy and medieval European magic were falsely attributed to Apollonius of Tyana which spanned the Greek, Arabic, and Latin traditions.

In the Greek tradition, there is The Book of Wisdom (Greek: Biblos Sophias) which is a twelfth-century astrological magic book that dates to the fifth century but survives only as late as the fifteenth century. The Book of Wisdom may also have survived in the Latin and Arabic traditions as having been published and distributed as a series of short separate tracts or chapters under a variety of different titles.

In the Latin tradition, there is the Golden Flowers (Flores Aurei) which is a thirteenth-century book of angelic magic which supposedly contains Apollonius' select extracts and prayers from the mythical and lost Book of Flowers of Heavenly Teaching (Liber Florum Caelestis Doctrinae) compiled by King Solomon. The Golden Flowers was later compiled with its own derivative text called the New Art (Ars Nova) which would later become known as The Notory Art (Ars Notoria). The Notory Art explains that Apollonius of Tyana is the spiritual successor to King Solomon's angelic magic; for this reason, The Notory Art is often classified as belonging to the Pseudo-Solomonic corpus of magical literature. Another pseudepigraphal Latin work attributed to Apollonius of Tyana is the lost On Making Angelic Things (De Angelica Factura or De Angelica Factione) cited by the Italian university professor Cecco d'Ascoli in his commentary on the Sphere of the Cosmos by John de Sacrobosco. Another falsely attributed work is On the Seven Figures of the Seven Planets (Liber De Septem Figuris Septem Planetarum) which describes the seven magic squares attributed to the seven classical planets.

In the Arabic tradition, Apollonius of Tyana is called the "Master of the Talismans" (Sahib at-tilasmat) and known as Balinus (or, Balinas, Belenus, or Abuluniyus). The ninth-century Book of Balinas the Wise: On the Causes, or, the Book of the Secret of Creation (Kitab Balaniyus al-Hakim fi'l- 'llal, Kitab Sirr al-khaliqa wa-san 'at al-tabi'a) expounds upon the origins of the cosmos and its causes in six chapters and narrates the story of how Apollonius entered the crypt of Hermes Trismegistus to discover the Emerald Tablet (Tabula Smaragdina) which became a foundational text of alchemy. In this way, Apollonius of Tyana becomes the philosophical and alchemical successor to Hermes Trismegistus. Another Arabic book falsely attributed to Apollonius is the Treatise on Magic (Risalat al-Sihr) cited within the Great Introduction to the Treatise on Spirits and Talismans which was translated by Hunayn ibn Ishaq (al-Mudkhal al-Kabir ila 'ilm af 'al al-Ruhaniyat waw Talassimat). The Treatise on Magic might be the same work under its Latin titles De Hyle and De Arte Magica as cited by Cecco d'Ascoli.

=== Modern era ===
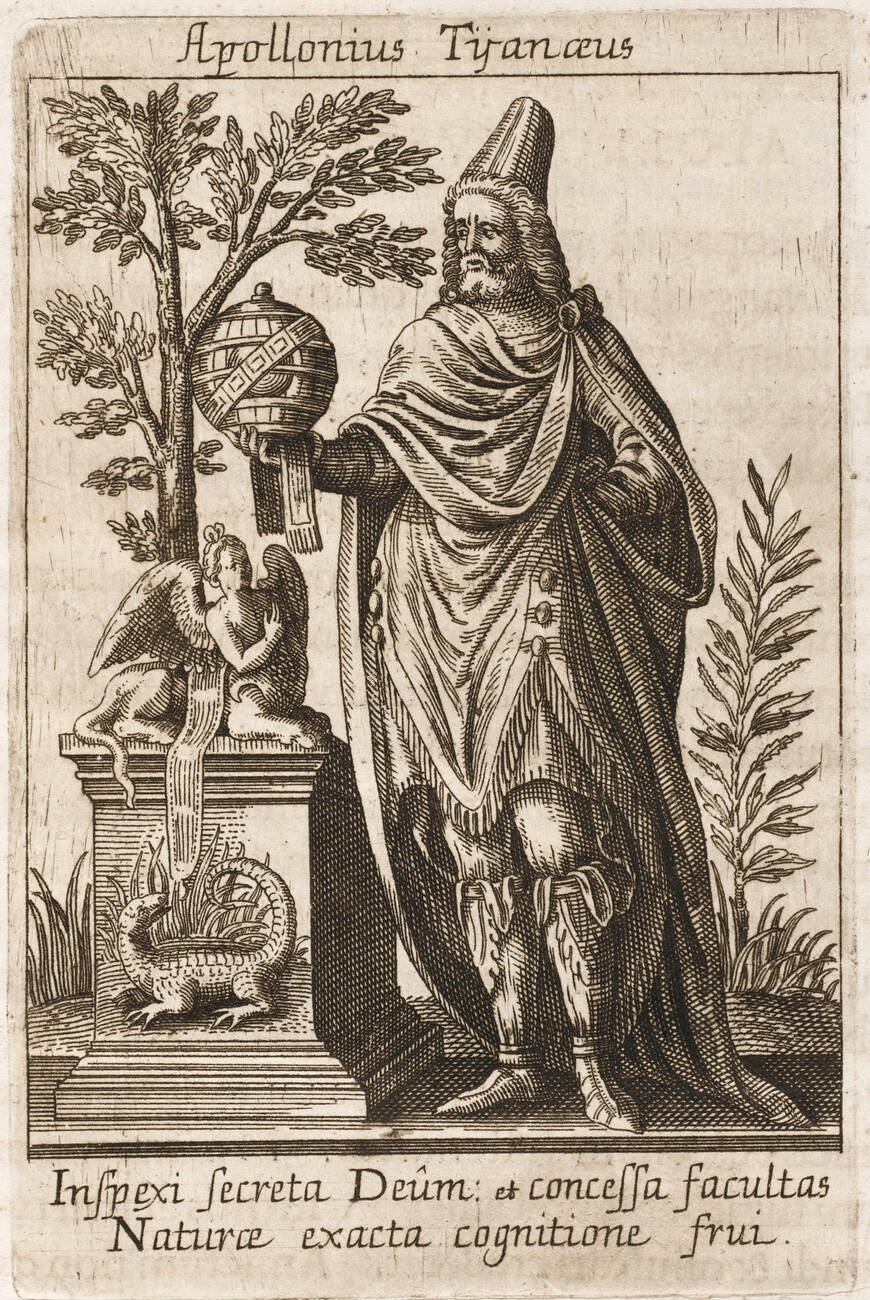
Apollonius of Tyana on a book cover or a frontispice, before 1800.

Beginning in the early 16th century, there was great interest in Apollonius in Europe, but the traditional ecclesiastical viewpoint prevailed, and until the Age of Enlightenment the Tyanean was usually treated as a demonic magician and a great enemy of the Church who collaborated with the devil and tried to overthrow Christianity.

Eliphas Levi made three attempts to raise the shade of Apollonius of Tyana by occult ritual, as described in his textbook on magic Dogme de la magie (1854).

=== Baháʼí scripture ===
The Tablet of Wisdom, written by Bahá'u'lláh, the founder of the Baháʼí Faith, names "Balinus" (Apollonius) as a great philosopher, who "surpassed everyone else in the diffusion of arts and sciences and soared unto the loftiest heights of humility and supplication." In another text Baháʼu'lláh states that he "derived his knowledge and sciences from the Hermetic Tablets and most of the philosophers who followed him made their philosophical and scientific discoveries from his words and statements".

=== Literature and film ===
Edward Bulwer-Lytton refers to Apollonius in The Last Days of Pompeii and Zanoni as a great master of occult power and wisdom.

Apollonius appears in Gustave Flaubert's novel The Temptation of Saint Anthony, where he tempts the titular saint with divine wisdom and the power to perform miracles. As a miracle worker and neo-Pythagorean philosopher, the character of Apollonius is used as a bridge between the two sections of the book covering the temptations of human sages and the temptations of the gods.

Apollonius of Tyana is a major character in Steven Saylor's historical novel Empire, which depicts his confrontation with the harsh Emperor Domitian. Apollonius is shown confounding the Emperor (and many others) in quick-witted dialogue, reminiscent of Socrates. The book's plot leaves ambiguous the issue of whether Apollonius possessed true magical power or that he was able to use suggestion and other clever tricks.

Avram Davidson's science fiction novel Masters of the Maze (1965) has Apollonius of Tyana as one of a select group of humans (and other sentient beings) who had penetrated to the center of a mysterious "Maze" traversing all of space and time. There he dwells in eternal repose, in company with the Biblical Enoch, the Chinese King Wen and Lao Tze, the 19th-century Briton Bathurst, and various other sages of the past and future, some of them Martians.

In The Circus of Dr. Lao (1935) by Charles G. Finney, Apollonius appears in the employ of Dr. Lao's circus and brings a dead man back to life. Apollonius of Tyana is one of the 7 circus characters portrayed by Tony Randall in the 1964 film The Seven Faces of Dr. Lao. This character does not have any philosophical context, rather he is a sideshow attraction similar to a fortune-teller who, besides being blind, has been blessed with clairvoyance. While he always speaks the truth, ugly or not, about the future, he is accursed with an ironic fate – nobody ever believes what he says.

In television, Apollonius of Tyana was portrayed by Mel Ferrer in The Fantastic Journey episode entitled "Funhouse". Apollonius was banished centuries ago to a time zone by the gods for opposing them. When the time zone travelers led by the 23rd century healer and pacifist named Varian arrive at a seemingly abandoned carnival, Apollonius intends to lure them into his funhouse of horrors so that he can possess the body of one of the travelers and escape his eternal imprisonment.

Keats' poem Lamia mentions and discusses Apollonius.

In Guillaume Apollinaire's poem "Zone," from Alcools, Apollonius is depicted with other figures historical and mythological, "floating around the first aeroplane."

=== Comparisons with Jesus ===
Comparisons between Apollonius and Jesus date to ancient times. Additionally, certain advocates of Enlightenment, deism and anti-Church positions saw him as an early forerunner of their own ethical and religious ideas, a proponent of a universal, non-denominational religion compatible with reason. These comparisons continued into the 20th century.

- Hierocles, governor of Lower Egypt during the reign of Diocletian, attempted to downplay the significance of Jesus' miracles by citing the miracles of Apollonius. He also argued for the superiority of pagan wisdom in view of Apollonius' followers refraining from elevating Apollonoius to the rank of God.
- Porphyry made similar use of Apollonius' miracles in his disputations with Christians, as well as contrasting Apollonius' bold defiance of Domitian to the humiliation of Christ at the hands of Pilate.
- In 1680, Charles Blount, a radical English deist, published the first English translation of the first two books of Philostratus's Life with an anti-Church introduction.
- In the Marquis de Sade's Dialogue Between a Priest and a Dying Man, the Dying Man compares Jesus to Apollonius as a false prophet.
- In his 1909 book The Christ, John Remsburg postulated that the religion of Apollonius disappeared because the proper conditions for its development did not exist. Buddhism, Christianity, and Islam thrived, however, because the existing conditions were favorable.
- Some early- to mid-20th-century Theosophists, notably C. W. Leadbeater, Alice A. Bailey, and Benjamin Creme, have maintained that Apollonius of Tyana was the reincarnation of the being they call the Master Jesus. Helena Blavatsky in 1881 refers to Apollonius of Tyana as "the great thaumaturgist of the second century AD".
- In the mid 20th century, the American expatriate poet Ezra Pound evoked Apollonius in his later Cantos as a figure associated with sun-worship and as a messianic rival to Christ. Pound identified him as Aryan within an antisemitic mythology, and celebrated his Sun worship and aversion to ancient Jewish animal sacrifice.
- In Gerald Messadié's The Man Who Became God, Apollonius appeared as a wandering philosopher and magician of about the same age as Jesus.
- Edward Gibbon compared Apollonius to Jesus in the footnotes to The Decline and Fall of the Roman Empire, saying "Apollonius of Tyana was born about the same time as Jesus Christ. His life (that of the former (Note: That is, Apollonius of Tyana)) is related in so fabulous a manner by his disciples, that we are at a loss to discover whether he was a sage, an imposter, or a fanatic." This led to controversy, as critics believed Gibbon was alluding to Jesus being a fanatic.
- Biblical scholar Bart D. Ehrman relates that he begins his introductory class on the New Testament, by describing an important figure from the first century without first revealing he is talking about the stories attached to Apollonius of Tyana.
- Erkki Koskenniemi has stated that Apollonius of Tyana is not a representative of a Hellenistic divine man.

== Editions ==
- Philostratus: Apollonius of Tyana. Letters of Apollonius, Ancient Testimonia, Eusebius's Reply to Hierocles, ed. Christopher P. Jones, Harvard University Press, Cambridge (Mass.) 2006 (Loeb Classical Library no. 458), ISBN 0-674-99617-8 (Greek texts and English translations)
- Philostratus: The Life of Apollonius of Tyana, ed. Christopher P. Jones, vol. 1 (Books I–IV) and 2 (Books V–VIII), Harvard University Press, Cambridge (Mass.) 2005 (Loeb Classical Library no. 16 and no. 17), ISBN 0-674-99613-5 and ISBN 0-674-99614-3 (Greek text and English translation)

== See also ==
- Elymas
- Christ figure
- Jesus of Nazareth
- John the Baptist
- List of people who disappeared mysteriously (pre-1910)
- List of unsolved deaths
- Simon Magus

== Sources ==
- C.P. Cavafy: "The Collected Poems: If Truly Dead" Translated by Aliki Barnstone, ISBN 0-393-06142-6
- Graham Anderson: Philostratus. Biography and Belles Lettres in the Third Century A.D., London 1986, ISBN 0-7099-0575-0
- Jaap-Jan Flinterman: Power, Paideia and Pythagoreanism, Amsterdam 1995, ISBN 90-5063-236-X
- James A. Francis: Subversive Virtue. Asceticism and Authority in the Second-Century Pagan World, University Park (PA) 1995, ISBN 0-271-01304-4
- Maria Dzielska: Apollonius of Tyana in Legend and History, Rome 1986, ISBN 88-7062-599-0
- Weisser, Ursula (1980). Spies, Otto (ed.). Das "Buch über das Geheimnis der Schöpfung" von Pseudo-Apollonios von Tyana. Berlin: De Gruyter. doi:10.1515/9783110866933. ISBN 978-3-11-086693-3.
