= Phraotes =

Ancient king of Taxila in Gandhara

Phraotes was a king of Taxila in Gandhara met by the Greek philosopher Apollonius of Tyana around 46 CE according to the Life of Apollonius Tyana written by Philostratus. It has been suggested that he might be identical with the Indo-Parthian king Gondophares IV Sases.

Apollonius described Phraotes' residence, Taxila, as being the same size as Nineveh, being walled like a Greek city whilst also being shaped with Narrow roads, and further describe Phraotes' kingdom as containing the old territory of Porus. Following an exchange with the king, Phraotes is reported to have subsidized both barbarians and neighboring states, with the objective of averting incursions into his kingdom. He also reported Hellenistic style urbanism in Taxila, probably referring to Sirkap, and explains that Phraotes speaks Greek fluently, a language he had been educated in while in exile to the east, beyond the river Hyphasis:

"Tell me, O King, how you acquired such a command of the Greek tongue, and whence you derived all your philosophical attainments in this place?"
[...]-"My father, after a Greek education, brought me to the sages at an age somewhat too early perhaps, for I was only twelve at the time, but they brought me up like their own son; for any that they admit knowing the Greek tongue they are especially fond of, because they consider that in virtue of the similarity of his disposition he already belongs to themselves."

Phraotes also recounted that his father, being the son of a king, had become an orphan from a young age. In accordance with Indian customs, two of his relatives assumed responsibility for his upbringing until they were killed by rebellious nobles during a ritualistic ceremony along the Indus River. This event led to the usurpation of the throne, compelling Phraotes' father to seek refuge with the king situated beyond the Hydaspes River, in modern-day Punjab, a ruler esteemed greater than Phraotes' father. Moreover, Phraotes states that his father received an education facilitated by the Brahmins upon request to the king and married the daughter of the Hydaspian king, whilst having one son who was Phraotes himself. Phraotes proceeds to narrate the opportune moment he seized to reclaim his ancestral kingdom, sparked by a rebellion of the citizens of Taxila against the usurpers. With fervent support from the populace, Phraotes led a triumphant entry into the residence of the usurpers, whilst the citizens brandished torches, swords, and bows in a display of unified resistance.
