= Hermocrates of Phocaea =

2nd-century Greek philosopher

Hermocrates (Ancient Greek: Ἑρμοκράτης) of Phocaea was a philosopher of ancient Greece, who lived in the 2nd century CE. He came from a renowned lineage of philosophers, being the grandson of the sophist Attalus and great-grandson of Polemon of Laodicea. He studied under Claudius Rufinus Sophistes of Smyrna. His parents were the otherwise unknown Rufianus and Callisto. He married a daughter of Antipater.

Hermocrates died at the age of twenty-five, or twenty-eight, according to other accounts. The writer Philostratus pronounces him one of the most distinguished rhetoricians of his age.
