= Attalus (sophist) =

2nd-century Greek philosopher

Attalus (Ancient Greek: Ἄτταλος) was an ancient Greek philosopher in the Second Sophistic tradition, who lived during the second century CE.

He was the son of the renowned sophist Polemon of Laodicea, and grandfather of a sophist named Hermocrates of Phocaea. Most of what we know about Attalus comes from a brief mention in the Lives of the Sophists of Philostratus, in which Philostratus both mentions that Attalus was a sophist and son of the famed Polemon, and also, cuttingly, that the only significant descendant of Polemon was his great-grandson, Hermocrates.

On the other hand, Attalus was noteworthy enough in his time to have had coins minted with his name on them. Attalus appears on some coins of Smyrna, which are figured in Gottfried Olearius's edition of Philostratus. They contain the inscription ΑΤΤΑΔΟΣ ΣΟΦΙΣ. ΤΑΙΣ ΠΑΤΡΙΣΙ ΣΜΥΡ. ΔΑΟΚ., which is translated as "Attalus, the Sophist, to his native cities Smyrna and Laodicea." The latter is conjectured to have been the place of his birth, the former to have adopted him as a citizen.
