= Life of Apollonius of Tyana =

Work by Philostratus

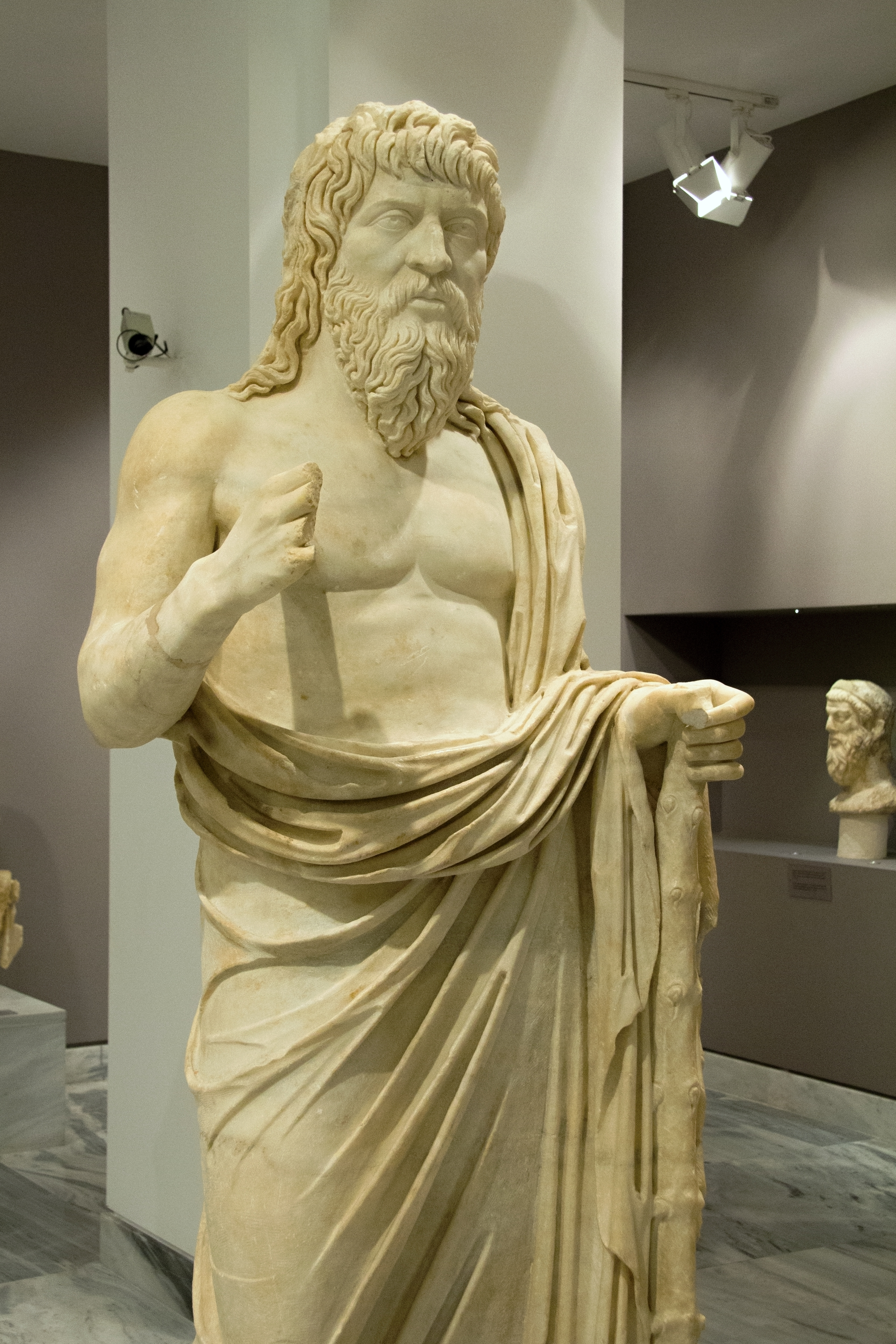
A wandering philosopher, probably representing Apollonius of Tyana, who lived a part of his life in Crete and died there. Found in Gortyn (late 2nd century AD), now in Heraklion Archaeological Museum, Crete.

Life of Apollonius of Tyana (Ancient Greek: Τὰ ἐς τὸν Τυανέα Ἀπολλώνιον), also known by its Latin title Vita Apollonii, is a text in eight books written in Ancient Greece by Philostratus (c. AD 170 – c. AD 245). It tells the story of Apollonius of Tyana (c. AD 15 – c. AD 100), a Pythagorean philosopher and teacher.

== Contents ==
The book extensively describes the alleged travels of Apollonius to Italy, Hispania, Nubia, Syria, Mesopotamia and India. Some scholars view it as fiction, and contend that Apollonius probably never reached any of these countries, but spent his entire life in the East of the Roman Empire.

According to Philostratus, his book relies on a multiplicity of sources:

- A book on the youth of Apollonius, written by Maximus of Aegae.
- Memoirs written by a disciple of Apollonius, Damis.
- The "Memorabilia of Apollonius of Tyana, magician and philosopher", written by a Moeragenes, although Philostratus considers that account rather unreliable.
- Local knowledge from towns like Ephesus, Tyana, Aegae, and Antioch.

The eastward travel of Apollonius is described in Book I. Apollonius receives from the Parthian king Vardanes (40–47) a safe-conduct to the Parthian ruler Phraotes in India:

And with that, he showed them a letter, written to that effect, and this gave them occasion to marvel afresh at the humanity and foresight of Vardanes. For he had addressed the letter in question to the satrap of the Indus, although he was not subject to his dominion; and in it he reminded him of the good service he had done him, but declared that he would not ask any recompense for the same, "for", he said, "it is not my habit to ask for a return of favors." But he said he would be very grateful, if he could give a welcome to Apollonius and send him on wherever he wished to go. And he had given gold to the guide, so that in case he found Apollonius in want thereof, he might give it him and save him from looking to the generosity of anyone else. – Book II:17

The description of Apollonius's visit to India is made in Book II, and particularly the visit to the city of Taxila, described in chapters 20 to 24. He describes constructions of the Greek type in Taxila, probably referring to Sirkap:

Taxila, they tell us, is about as big as Nineveh, and was fortified fairly well after the manner of Greek cities. I have already described the way in which the city is walled, but they say that it was divided up into narrow streets in the same irregular manner as in Athens, and that the houses were built in such a way that if you look at them from outside they had only one story, while if you went into one of them, you at once found subterranean chambers extending as far below the level of the earth as did the chambers above. – Book II:23

He also explains that the Indo-Parthian king of Taxila, named Phraotes, speaks Greek fluently, a language in which he had been educated while in exile to the east, beyond the river Hyphasis:

Tell me, O King, how you acquired such a command of the Greek tongue, and whence you derived all your philosophical attainments in this place? – Book II:29

My father, after a Greek education, brought me to the sages at an age somewhat too early perhaps, for I was only twelve at the time, but they brought me up like their own son; for any that they admit knowing the Greek tongue they are especially fond of, because they consider that in virtue of the similarity of his disposition he already belongs to themselves. – Book II:31

== Editions ==
- Philostratus: The Life of Apollonius of Tyana, trans. F.C. Conybeare, vol. 1 (Books I–IV) and 2 (Books V–VIII), Harvard University Press, Cambridge (Mass.) 1911 (Loeb Classical Library no. 16 and no. 17), ISBN 0-674-99018-8 and ISBN 0-674-99019-6 (Greek text and English translation)
- Philostratus: The Life of Apollonius of Tyana, ed. Christopher P. Jones, vol. 1 (Books I–IV) and 2 (Books V–VIII), Harvard University Press, Cambridge (Mass.) 2005 (Loeb Classical Library no. 16 and no. 17), ISBN 0-674-99613-5 and ISBN 0-674-99614-3 (Greek text and English translation)
- Filostrat: Viața lui Apollonius din Tyana, translated by Marius-Tiberiu Alexianu, Editura Polirom, Iași 1997, ISBN 973-683-000-4 (Romanian translation)
