= Martyrdom of Pionius =

Christian martyr and saint

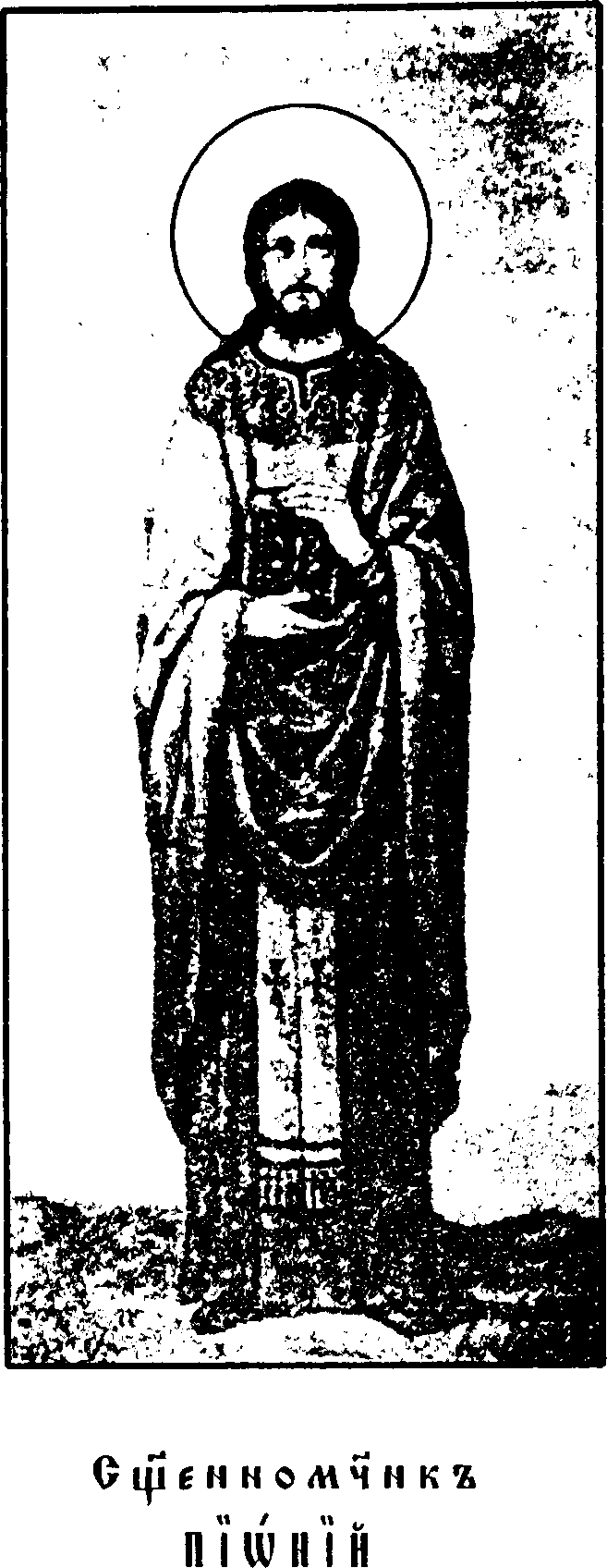

The Martyrdom of Pionius (Greek: Πιόνιος) is an account dating from about 250 AD to 300 AD of the martyrdom of a Christian from Smyrna named Pionius. It is also known as The Martyrdom of Pionius the Presbyter and His Companions, The Acts of Pionius, and in Latin as Martyrium Pionii or Passio Pionii. Pionius was a presbyter, and was most likely killed in 250 AD during the rule of the Roman Emperor Decius. The feast day of Saint Pionius is kept on March 11 in Eastern Orthodox churches, and on February 1 in Roman Catholicism.

== Narrative overview ==
The narrative records that Pionius and several other Christians were killed on the "birthday" of Polycarp, a prominent Christian martyr of an earlier period. Warned by God in a dream the previous night about his impending martyrdom, Pionius is arrested, gives a speech to local Jews and Greeks, is put on trial, imprisoned and tortured, then killed. The Martyrdom portrays Pionius as a willing martyr, even going so far as to place himself in chains prior to his arrest, repeatedly emphasizing that he goes freely to his death. Historian Geoffrey de Ste. Croix says, "If with most scholars we date the martyrdom of Pionius to the Decian persecution (250 AD), following the Passio Pionii, we cannot reckon Pionius a volunteer even though after being arrested he wrapped chains around his own neck and those of his two companions (Pass.Pion.2.3-4), since Pionius and the others would have been required to sacrifice in any event; but if Eusebius (HE 4.15.47) is right in putting the martyrdom under Marcus Aurelius (as believed, e.g., by Grégoire (Persecutions 108-114,157 f.) who ruled from 161 to 180 AD, then we should have to count Pionius and his two companions as volunteers."

The Empire-wide measures taken under Decius in 250 AD required everyone to provide sacrifices and eat sacrificial meat, one of the four things forbidden to Christians by the original Apostles in Acts 21:25. A report of the martyrdom of Pionius at that time appears in a report from Smyrna based on the original transcript of the governor's hearing, featuring the strategos of Smyrna, Claudius Rufinus Sophistes. "Pionius was a model citizen of Smyrna admired by all. One of the three temple guardians accompanied by policemen went to find Pionius because he had refused to perform sacrifices. He was waiting for them in his house with the Christians Sabina and Asklepiades. The three had already put shackles around their necks to show that they were ready to go to prison. While efforts were made to persuade them to follow the example of others who had already performed the sacrifice, the three were led through the streets to the agora."

The author of the Passio in the mid-third century says the upper galleries of the square were packed with Greeks, Hebrews and women who had the day off because of the Grand Shabbat. Pionius responds to the crowd's taunting by reminding the Greeks that Homer never considered it pious to rejoice at another losing his life. He reminds the Jews of Moses and Solomon, who preach offering aid to the enemy and not rejoicing at his fate. He accuses them of showing no compassion by the fact of being human beings or the victims of injustice themselves. He follows with a series of rhetorical questions: "To whom have we done wrong? Have we perchance murdered someone? Or, do we persecute anyone? Or have we obliged anyone to venerate idols?" Pionius is tortured, repeatedly asked, "Will you sacrifice?" and repeatedly declines, and is eventually sentenced to be burned alive.

== Historicity ==
Daniel Boyarin describes the historical accuracy of the Martyrdom of Pionius as "highly contested" among scholars, with varying levels of support among scholars for accuracy of its historical details. Jan Kozlowski, following L. Robert, has argued that various details of the text indicate that it was written in the third century AD, not long after the Decian persecution. Robin Lane Fox has also argued strongly for the reliability of the account, describing it as 'a text of rare authority, true to its first contemporary form'. Bart Ehrman argues that the narrative shows traces of "literary license, if not wholesale invention" in the way that it echoes the earlier story of Polycarp, who died in 155 AD. Theologian Arthur Cushman McGiffert says "Ruinart's Acta Martyrum Sincera is a Latin narrative of the martyrdom of Pionius which appears to be substantially the same as the document which Eusebius used in the Greek. The account bears all the marks of genuineness, and may be regarded as trustworthy, at least on the main points." Historian William Tabbernee reports Pionius as having two trials, the first under Polemon, the temple-verger at Smyrna, and the second under Julius Proculus Quintilianus.

McGiffert says: "The Life of Polycarp which purports to have been written by Pionius, is manifestly spurious and entirely untrustworthy, and belongs to the latter part of the fourth century. The true Pionius therefore, who suffered under Decius, and the pseudo-Pionius who wrote that life are to be sharply distinguished." According to the Martyrdom of Polycarp, (chapter 22) Gaius transcribed the text of the Martyrdom of Polycarp from the papers of Irenaeus; Socrates (or Isocrates) then transcribed the text from Gaius' copy; then it says Pionius produced his own copy after assembling papers "worn with age". "Ehrman assumes that this is the Pionius of Smyrna who was martyred during the Decian persecution c.250 AD. Kleist disagrees and correlates this Pionius with the author of the Vita Pol. instead. Naturally some scholars have equated all three."

=== Dating Pionius' death ===
In the second century, Asia Minor experienced several regional persecutions from varying causes. Emperor Marcus Aurelius' mandata (mandates) to the provincial governors to impose severe punishments on the sacrilegious were believed by the Bishop of Sardeis to be triggering manhunts. The vast majority of scholars date the "Martyrdom of Polycarp" to this period (c.155-168 AD). In the Historia Ecclesiae 4.14-15, Eusebius gives an account of the martyrdom of Polycarp, which is well attested, and other martyrs of the same period, and includes: "... Pionius, who made some excellent apologies for the Christian faith, were likewise burnt." McGiffert says, "Eusebius has fallen into a serious chronological blunder by making these other martyrs contemporaries of Polycarp. We learn from a notice in the document by Ruinart that Pionius ... and the others were put to death during the persecution of Decius in 250 AD and this date is confirmed by external evidence." Possible explanations for this error include a phrase Eusebius repeats in the heading of the document indicating these martyrdoms took place at the same season of the year, while Eusebius may have mistakenly interpreted that to mean at the same time.

The Martyrdom of Pionius and his Companions says, "On the second day of the sixth month, on the occasion of a great Sabbath, and on the anniversary of the blessed martyr Polycarp, while the persecution of Decius was still on, there were arrested the presbyter Pionius ... It was Saturday ..." The "sixth month" appears to be a reference to the modern month of March. While the Catholic Encyclopedia says Pionius was arrested on 23 February 250 and killed on 12 March, Monroy says German theologian Willy Rordorf thinks the precision of the description of the date does not indicate a day of the week, but instead indicates the feast of Terminalia, celebrated in the Roman world in honor of the god Terminus as the last day of the year precisely on 23 February. "This explains the presence of "Greeks, Hebrews, and women" and corresponds with a report by Lactantius, according to which Diocletian, at the instigation of Galerius, put in hand the Great Persecution precisely in the Terminalia." This theory has been contested by R. Cacitti who says the terminology of Grand Shabbat in church literature arose theologically and not chronologically. "Strobel opts for Saturday, 22 February 167 AD (an astronomical full moon)."

=== Authorship and style ===
The Martyrdom of Pionius makes two claims for itself: that it was written by Pionius, and that Pionius "left us this writing for our instruction" (Pionius 1). As to the first claim, Bart Ehrman says Pionius is written almost entirely in the third person, does not move into the first person till near the end, and then "it is clearly not Pionius speaking as the author claims to have witnessed the miracle that transpired at the martyr's death." Ehrman says the entire account bears evidence of literary license in its parallels to the "Martyrdom of Polycarp" which it may have used as a model for its style. But there is no doubt such martyrologies served as instruction. D.R. Woolf says the martyrologies "disseminated particular messages and instructions to their readers through commentary and the examples provided by the martyrs. Within the narrative accounts and the literary reconstruction of the martyrs words and experiences, lay the virtues, doctrine and values held by the oppressed group." L. Arik Greenberg says "there is an underlying thematic unity between the Hellenistic Noble Death tradition...and Christian martyrological texts by drawing upon the Philosopher's Death paradigm." L. Stephanie Cobb says that "in a number of ways, the martyrologies such as Pionius, appropriate both actual and spatial elements of the amphitheater" in that they claim power for the powerless at the moment when they are most victimized; they ascribe power onto the body of the martyr/gladiator; and they insist martyrs chose martyrdom and did so with masculine honor and bravery.

== Sociology ==
Sociologist and feminist scholar Elizabeth Castelli says it was in the writing of stories such as "The Martyrdom of Pionius" that early Christian culture first formed its cultural identity and was "indelibly marked by the collective memory of the religious suffering of others." She says: "The category of collective memory helps to illuminate why martyrdom was —and continues to be— such a critical building block of Christian culture."

G. E. M. de Ste. Croix, Marxist historian, says, "By around the late first century, the Romans had a clear conception of what Christians were which encompassed most, (although by no means all), of the myriad of groups who considered themselves Christian. This understanding focused on what Christians were not, namely people who would not participate in traditional sacrifices."

Much recent work has focused on the fashioning of the identities of Christians and Jews through mutual interaction which was often hostile. Priest and theologian Mauricio Saavedra Monroy says "the Martyrdom of Pionius records the "progressive disencounter [the ongoing process of separation] between the Jews of the day and the Christian minority." Monroy notes "the development on the Christian side of a literary genre and a theology of accusation and defense in the face of Jewish proselytism exercised in the midst of the persecutions of the Christians who, at this point in history are already clearly differentiated from the former by the authorities of the Empire and the mass of the people." Both the Martyrdom of Polycarp and that of Pionius convey that the social ascendancy of Judaism in Smyrna was exploited to take advantage of the weakness of the Christians during the time of persecution. Even if they were elaborated, "it is clear that the perception the editors of these sources had of the Jewish community present in Smyrna clearly conveys a real conflict between Christians and Jews."
