= Polemon of Laodicea =

Greek sophist (c. 90 – 144)

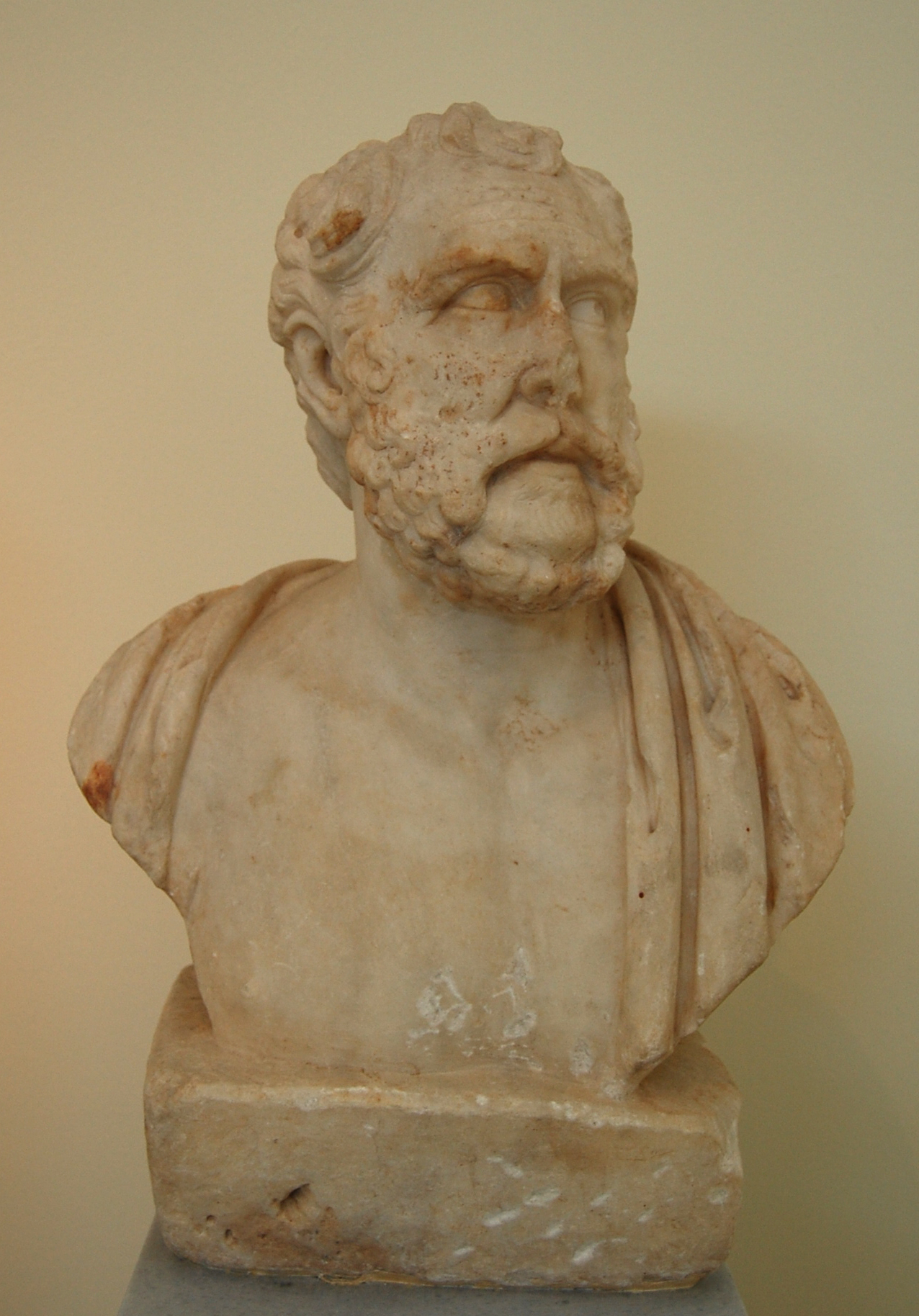
- Bust of Polemon, Pentelic marble, found in the Temple of Olympian Zeus (Athens)
- Born: 90 AD; Laodicea on the Lycus (now Eskihisar, Denizli, Turkey)
- Died: 144 AD
- Occupation: Sophist
- Title: Strategos (Given by Hadrian)
- Family: Mithridatic

Marcus Antonius Polemon (Greek: Μάρκος Ἀντώνιος Πολέμων; c. 90 – 144 AD) or Antonius Polemon, also known as Polemon of Smyrna or Polemon of Laodicea (Greek: Πολέμων ὁ Λαοδικεύς), was a sophist who lived in the 2nd century.

His son Attalus and great-grandson Hermocrates of Phocaea were also notable sophists.

== Early life ==
Polemon was Anatolian Greek from a family of Roman consular rank. He was the grandson of Polemon II of Pontus.

He was born in Laodicea on the Lycus in Phrygia (modern Turkey), however, he spent a great part of his life in Smyrna (modern İzmir, Turkey). From early manhood, he received civic honors from the citizens of Smyrna for his services to the city.

In Smyrna he was educated by Scopelianos of Klazomenai. He then attended the school of Timocrates of Heracleia for four years. After that he travelled to Bithynia to learn from the Sophist Dio Chrysostom.

== Career ==
Polemon was a master of rhetoric, a prominent member of the Second Sophistic. He was favored by several Roman Emperors. Trajan is said to have granted him the privilege of free travel wherever he wished; Hadrian extended that privilege to Polemon's posterity. Hadrian not only admitted he ruled with Polemon's advice, but Polemon accompanied the emperor during his travels in Greece and Asia Minor. When his enemies accused Polemon of spending funds Hadrian had given him to benefit the city of Smyrna, the emperor defended the sophist with a letter declaring that Polemon had rendered Hadrian an account of the moneys entrusted to him. Polemon gave the dedicatory oration to Hadrian's Temple of Olympian Zeus in Athens, which G.W. Bowersock speculates was "an embarrassing repudiation of the obvious person for the occasion, Herodes Atticus. There is a famous story of his arrogant behavior towards Antoninus Pius, whom he threw out of his house at midnight when Antoninus was the newly arrived Governor of Asia.

Three times he headed a legation dispatched by Smyrna to the emperor. Under Hadrian he was made strategos, and subsequently appointed strategos for life. He was a priest of Dionysos and agonothetes of the athletic competitions that took place in Smyrna in honour of the emperor Hadrian. Owing to Polemon's rhetorical skills the emperor stopped favoring Ephesos and endowed Smyrna with 10 million drachmae, which financed the building of a new grain market, a gymnasium, and a temple.

Polemon founded in Smyrna one of the foremost schools of rhetoric. His style of oratory was imposing rather than pleasing; however his character was haughty and reserved.

== Later life ==
In his later years, Polemon suffered from arthritis. At the age of 56 and no longer able to stand the pain, he ordered his servants to lock him in his family tomb. When his friends and family begged him not to commit suicide in this manner, he said, "Give me another body and I shall come forth." There, he most likely died from either starvation or dehydration.

== Works ==
Polemon's treatise on physiognomy is preserved in a 14th-century Arabic translation. The only fully surviving works of Polemon are his funeral orations for the Athenians generals Callimachus and Cynaegirus, who died at the Battle of Marathon in 490 BC. These orations are titled logoi epitaphioi (epitaphs). His rhetorical compositions were subjects that were taken from Athenian history.

== Bibliography ==
- Seeing the Face, Seeing the Soul: Polemon's Physiognomy from Classical Antiquity to Medieval Islam, edited by Simon Swain, Oxford University Press (2007); includes English translations of the major surviving Greek, Latin, and Arabic versions of Polemon's Physiognomy.
- M. W. Gleason, Making Men: Sophists and Self-Presentation in Ancient Rome, Princeton (1995).
- M. D. Campanile, "Note sul bios de Polemone", Studi ellenistici, 12 (1999), 269–315.
- Reader, William W.; Chvála-Smith, Anthony J. (1996). The Severed Hand and the Upright Corpse: The Declamations of Marcus Antonius Polemo. Scholars Press. ISBN 9780788502828.
- Dictionary of Greek and Roman Biography and Mythology^{[usurped]}
