= Nicetes of Smyrna =

Nicetes (or Nicetas) of Smyrna (Ancient Greek: Νικήτης or Νικήτας ὁ Σμυρναῖος, Nīkḗtēs or Nīkḗtās ho Smurnaîos; AD 1st century) was an Ancient Greek rhetorician and philosopher.

A noted forensic orator, he is considered the instigator of the Second Sophistic in Asia Minor during the first century. He has been identified with Sacerdos ille Nicetes, 'that priest Nicetes' who taught Pliny the Younger and to whom Tacitus referred in his Dialogus de oratoribus XV, 3.^{[en]}
