= John Remsburg =

American teacher, religious skeptic and writer (1848-1919)

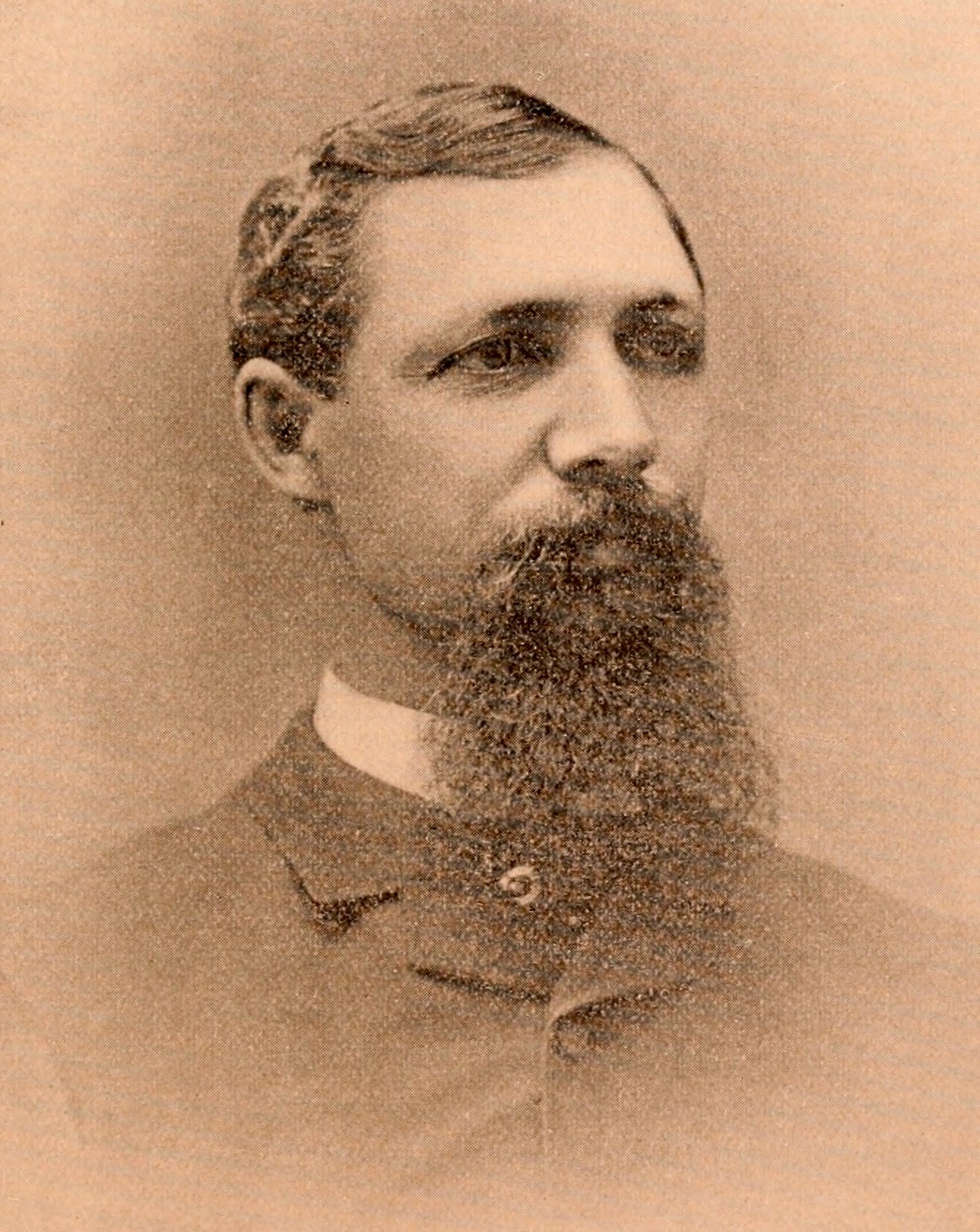
- John Eleazer Remsburg
- Born: January 7, 1848; Fremont, Ohio, US
- Died: September 24, 1919 (aged 71); Porterville, California, US
- Occupations: Author; secularist
- Notable work: The Christ (1909)
- Spouse: Nora Eiler

John Eleazer Remsburg (variously Remsberg; January 7, 1848 – September 24, 1919) was an ardent religious skeptic in America in the late 19th and early 20th centuries. In his book 1909 book The Christ, Remsburg lists forty-two ancient writers who did not mention Jesus or whose mentions are suspect, and this list has appeared in many subsequent books that question the historicity of Jesus. Remsburg himself wrote that the man Jesus may have existed, but that the Christ of the gospels is mythical.

== Life ==
Remsburg was born in Fremont, Ohio, a son of George J. and Sarah A. (Willey) Remsburg. He enlisted in the Union army at the age of sixteen during the American Civil War. On October 9, 1870, he married Nora M. Eiler of Atchison, Kansas. He was a teacher for 15 years, a superintendent of public instruction in Atchison County, Kansas for four years, then a writer and lecturer in support of free thought, his lectures being translated into German, French, Bohemian, Dutch, Swedish, Norwegian, Bengali and Singalese. He was also a life member of the American Secular Union, of which he was president from 1897 to 1900, and a member of the Kansas State Horticultural Society.

== Views ==
Remsburg was a rationalist and critic of morality as found in the Bible. Although he lived in Atchison, Kansas, that town's library has no copies of his work, according to Fred Whitehead in Freethought History (#2, 1992). In Bible Morals, he cited twenty crimes and vices sanctioned by scripture. In his The Bible, he condemns as pernicious and false such Biblical views as:

Blessed are the poor in spirit; Blessed are the meek, for they shall inherit the earth; If thy right eye offend thee, pluck it out; If thy right hand offend thee, cut it off; Whosoever shall marry her that is divorced committeth adultery; Resist not evil; Whosoever shall smite thee on the right cheek, turn to him the other also; Love your enemies; Lay not up for yourselves treasurers upon earth; Take no thought for your life, what ye shall eat, or what ye shall drink, nor yet for your body, what ye shall put on; Take therefore no thought for the morrow.

Such views, combined with the name of Christ, Remsburg held, have caused more persecutions, wars, and miseries than any other.

Remsburg "delivered over 3,000 lectures, speaking in fifty-two States, Territories and Provinces, and in 1,250 different cities and towns, including every large city of United States and Canada."

== Role in Christ Myth debate ==
In recent years a list of forty-two names from the "Silence of Contemporary Writers" chapter of The Christ (sometimes called the Remsberg List) has appeared in several books regarding the nonhistoricity hypothesis by authors such as James Patrick Holding, Hilton Hotema, Jawara D. King, Madalyn Murray O'Hair, Dorothy M. Murdock Robert M. Price, Asher Norman, Frank Zindler, and Tim C. Leedom et al. This Remsburg List was improved upon in 2012 with the book No Meek Messiah, augmenting the number of "Silent Writers" to 126. The list was published in Free Inquiry magazine in August 2014.

Remsburg stated "This volume on "The Christ" was written by one who recognizes in the Jesus of Strauss and Renan a transitional step, but not the ultimate step, between orthodox Christianity and radical Freethought. By the Christ is understood the Jesus of the New Testament. The Jesus of the New Testament is the Christ of Christianity. The Jesus of the New Testament is a supernatural being. He is, like the Christ, a myth. He is the Christ myth".

Moreover, Remsburg clarified that "It is not against the man Jesus that I write, but against the Christ Jesus of theology" explaining that "Jesus of Nazareth, the Jesus of humanity, the pathetic story of whose humble life and tragic death has awakened the sympathies of millions, is a possible character and may have existed; but the Jesus of Bethlehem, the Christ of Christianity, is an impossible character and does not exist."

Furthermore, in "The Christ a Myth" chapter Remsburg described myth as falling into three broad categories: historical, philosophical, and poetic (a mixture of the previous two). Remsburg concluded the chapter by stating "While all Freethinkers are agreed that the Christ of the New Testament is a myth they are not, as we have seen, and perhaps never will be, fully agreed as to the nature of this myth. Some believe that he is a historical myth; others that he is a pure myth. Some believe that Jesus, a real person, was the germ of this Christ whom subsequent generations gradually evolved; others contend that the man Jesus, as well as the Christ, is wholly a creation of the human imagination. After carefully weighing the evidence and arguments in support of each hypothesis the writer, while refraining from expressing a dogmatic affirmation regarding either, is compelled to accept the former as the more probable."

In "The Christ a Myth" chapter, Remsburg also stated:

"The conceptions regarding the nature and character of Christ, and the value of the Christian Scriptures as historical evidence, are many, chief of which are the following

1. Orthodox Christians believe that Christ is a historical character, supernatural and divine; and that the New Testament narratives, which purport to give a record of his life and teachings, contain nothing but infallible truth.

2. Conservative Rationalists, like Renan, and the Unitarians, believe that Jesus of Nazareth is a historical character and that these narratives, eliminating the supernatural elements, which they regard as myths, give a fairly authentic account of his life.

3. Many radical Freethinkers believe that Christ is a myth, of which Jesus of Nazareth is the basis, but that these narratives are so legendary and contradictory as to be almost if not wholly, unworthy of credit.

4. Other Freethinkers believe that Jesus Christ is a pure myth—that he never had an existence, except as a Messianic idea, or an imaginary solar deity."

== Bibliography ==
- Life of Thomas Paine (1880)
- The Image Breaker (1882)
- False Claims, (1883)
- Bible Morals (1884)
- Sabbath Breakers (1885)
- The Fathers of Our Republic (1886)
- Was Lincoln a Christian (1893)
- Was Washington a Christian (1899)
- The Bible (1901)
- Six Historic Americans (1906)
- The Christ (1909)
