= Attalus (UAV) =

Greek anti-tank drone

The Attalus is an anti-tank loitering munition developed and produced by Intracom Defense for the Ministry of National Defence (Greece). It was revealed at DEFEA 2023 in Athens.

According to the manufacturer, the Attalus is powered by an electric motor which gives an endurance of forty-two minutes or a range of 50km.

It is armed with a high-explosive anti-tank warhead which can penetrate 400mm of rolled homogeneous armour.

The structure is made of composite materials to keep the weight down to 13.6 kg (30 lb). It is also modular so that the Attalus can adapt to several environments. The wings are detachable which allows for easy transportation.
