= Marcus Antonius Polemo II =

Marcus Antonius Polemo II (Ancient Greek : Μάρκος Ἀντώνιος Πολέμων Πυθόδωρος) (died c. 69/72), dynast of Olba and king in Cilicia between 54-69/72. This character has sometimes been confused with his contemporary cousin and almost namesake Polemon II of Pontus.

== Origin and reign ==
Marcus Antonius Polemo II was the eldest son of Marcus Antonius Polemo I. He succeeded him as “sovereign client” of Rome as “dynast” of Olba and king in Cilicia.

== Marriage ==
Marcus Antonius Polemo II married Berenice in 54, daughter of Herod Agrippa I, for whom he agreed to be circumcised but who abandoned him shortly after.

== General sources ==
- Christian Settipani, Continuité gentilice et continuité familiale dans les familles sénatoriales romaines à l'époque impériale, Oxford, Linacre College, Unit for Prosopographical Research, coll. « Prosopographica et Genealogica / 2 », 2000, 597 p. (ISBN 1-900934-02-7), Addenda III (janvier-décembre 2002).
- Maurice Sartre Le Haut-Empire romain. Les provinces de la Méditerranée orientale d'Auguste aux Sévères Point Histoire n° H220 Éditions du Seuil Paris 1997 ISBN 2020281538.
