= Second Sophistic =

Term for 1st to 3rd century Greek sophist writers

The Second Sophistic is a literary-historical term referring to the Greek writers who flourished from the reign of Nero until c. 230 AD and who were catalogued and celebrated by Philostratus in his Lives of the Sophists. However, some recent research has indicated that this Second Sophistic, which was previously thought to have abruptly appeared in the late 1st century, actually had its roots in the early 1st century. It was followed in the 5th century by the philosophy of Byzantine rhetoric, sometimes referred to as the Third Sophistic.

Writers known as members of the Second Sophistic include Nicetes of Smyrna, Aelius Aristides, Dio Chrysostom, Herodes Atticus, Favorinus, Philostratus, Lucian, and Polemon of Laodicea. Plutarch is also often associated with the Second Sophistic movement, although multiple historians consider him to have been somewhat aloof from its emphasis on rhetoric, especially in his later work.

The term Second Sophistic comes from Philostratus. In his Lives of the Sophists, Philostratus traces the beginnings of the movement to the orator Aeschines in the 4th century BC. But its earliest representative was really Nicetes of Smyrna, in the late 1st century AD. Unlike the original Sophistic movement of the 5th century BC, the Second Sophistic was little concerned with politics. But it was, to a large degree, to meet the everyday needs and respond to the practical problems of Greco-Roman society. It came to dominate higher education and left its mark on a number of forms of literature. The period from around 50 to 100 AD was a period when oratorical elements dealing with the first sophists of Greece were reintroduced to the Roman Empire. The province of Asia embraced the Second Sophistic the most. Diococceianus (or Chrysostomos) and Aelius Aristides were popular sophists of the period. They gave orations on topics like poetry and public speaking. They did not teach debate or anything that had to do with politics because rhetoric was restrained due to the imperial government's rules.

Owing largely to the influence of Plato and Aristotle, philosophy came to be regarded as distinct from sophistry, the latter being regarded as specious and rhetorical, a practical discipline. Thus, by the time of the Roman Empire, a sophist was simply a teacher of rhetoric and a popular public speaker. For instance, Libanius, Himerius, Aelius Aristides, and Fronto were sophists in this sense.

== Overview ==
The year 146 BC marks the moment in history in which the Romans conquered one of the first civilized empires in the West. Ancient Greece is known for its rich culture, mythology, technology and intellect. In its classical period it was one of the greatest early empires. After the civilization fell to the Roman conquest, the emerging empire would begin to grow, following many of the traditions of the Greeks. Mirroring some of their architectural styles and adapting a similar religious cult, the Empire held the Greek culture with reverence to its customs. Throughout its growth, the Romans incorporated the Greeks into their society and imperial life. In the 1st and 2nd centuries AD, a renaissance of Hellenic oratory and education captivated the Roman elites. The resurgence was called the Second Sophistic and it recalled the grand orators and teachings of the 5th century BC. “The sophist was to revive the antique purer form of religion and to encourage the cults of the heroes and Homeric gods.”

In this century, the Roman Emperors such as Trajan, Hadrian and others, held these intellectuals in their high esteem. A number of them paid patronage to Athens and other Greek cities in the Empire. Elites sent their sons to be educated in schools developed by these sophists. The Emperor Hadrian sent his adoptive son Antoninus to study under the acclaimed Polemo in Smyrna. The Second Sophistic opened doors for the Greeks to prosper surprisingly, in a number of ways on their own terms. This renaissance enabled them to become a prominent society that the Romans could respect and revere. The sophists and their movement provided a way for the Romans to legitimate themselves as civilized intellectuals and associate themselves with an old imperial preeminence. This movement allowed the Greeks to become a part of the Roman Empire but still retain their cultural identity.

== Definition of sophist ==
Sophism was the revival of the use and value of higher education in the Roman Empire during the 1st and 2nd centuries AD. This also included a renewed emphasis and importance of rhetoric and oratory. The practice and teachings were modeled after the Athenian vocabulary of 400 BC, as well as the Hellenic traditions of that time. The sophists were great lecturers and declaimers who were esteemed to address various issues of political, economic and social importance. Thus, they served a vast array of positions from educational and social leaders, to ambassadors, Imperial Secretaries and high priests. In these orders, they won the favor of Emperors who would restore their eastern centers of intellect. Some, such as Lucian, heavily favored Atticism (an artificial purist movement favoring archaic expressions), while others, such as Plutarch, favored the Greek of their day (Koine Greek).

== Oratorical styles ==
A resurgence of educational value occurred during this time and these sophists were at the heart of it. They emphasized the importance of the practice of oratory. Sophists would begin their careers lecturing to groups of students. As they gained recognition and further competence, they would begin speaking out to the public. There were two different oratory styles of sophism that developed out of the period of enlightenment: Asianism and Atticism.

=== Asianism ===
Philostratus describes Asianism as a form that "[...] aims at but never achieves the grand style". He adds that its style is more "flowery, bombastic, full of startling metaphors, too metrical, too dependent on the tricks of rhetoric, too emotional". This type of rhetoric is also sometimes referred to as "Ionian" and "Ephesian", because it came from outside of Athens.

=== Atticism ===
The other mode of rhetoric, Atticism, is explained by Philostratus as a technique that is exemplified by the sophist Aelius Aristides. He describes Aristides as one who "usually imitates some classical author, aims at simplicity of style, and is a purist, carefully avoiding any allusion or word that does not occur in a writer of the classical period". Atticism drew from Greece’s rich past and originated in its illustrious city of Athens. The lectures and declamations of these sophists were based more upon preparation and the study of information. Having this basis, they were then able to speak adeptly to their audiences. The sophists generally gave their discourses in Rome or one of three major sophist centres.

== Centres and key figures ==
The three main centers of sophism were: Ephesus, Smyrna and Athens. The sophists revitalized these cities, bringing in wealth, acclaim and foreign interest from around the Empire.

Smyrna was an important Greek city in the Empire at this age. Two noteworthy sophists, Polemon of Laodicea and Aelius Aristides, were educated and taught in this center, attracting the respect of its citizens. They also invited the attention or patronage of Roman Emperors such as Trajan and Marcus Aurelius. Although neither of these men called the city their birthplace, both Polemo and Aristides spent much of their time here studying rhetoric or advocating for its people. Another esteemed sophist in the 2nd century, Herodes Atticus, paved the way for succeeding sophists of Atticism in the great center of Athens. These three eminent connoisseurs of rhetoric were significant sophists of the 2nd century AD. Others succeeding them would strive to replicate and illustrate their immense knowledge of the Hellenic classics and eloquent skills in oratory.

Polemo of Laodicea was the earliest of the trio. He was born in approximately 85 AD and is the only Asianic orator of Smyrna. Like a number of the other sophists, Polemo came from a ranked family. He, therefore, had connections and status with the local administration and it was easy for him to thrive in political and social aspects. Being from an elite family provided him the means and footing to be able study the sophistic discipline. His wealth and political connections allowed him to travel and prosper in his role as an expert in robust rhetoric. Not only was Polemo admired in Smyrna and other surrounding Greek centers of intellect, but he was also quite popular and venerated in Rome. He acted as a sort of advocate for his area. Polemo found a great deal of favor in the eyes of the Emperors Trajan, Hadrian and Antoninus.

The Roman elites and Emperors valued the approval and sponsorship of acclaimed sophists. Herodes Atticus, at one point in time, received up to three letters a day from Emperor Marcus Aurelius. The Emperor also waited three days in Smyrna for the honor of meeting the student of Herodes and Polemo, Aelius Aristides. He then was required to wait one more day before he was allowed to hear him speak.

It seems that the association and a positive close relationship with these experts of rhetoric were coveted by these imperial officials. The sophists were held in high regard by those in surrounding regions and even by Roman elites and bureaucrats. “No other type of intellectual could compete with them in popularity, no creative artists existed to challenge their prestige at the courts of philhellenic Emperors, and though the sophists often show jealousy of the philosophers, philosophy without eloquence was nowhere.”

== Bibliography ==
- P. Aelius Aristides, The Complete Works, Vol. 1. Trans. Behr, C.A. The Netherlands: Brill, E.J., Leiden, 1986.
- Philostratus, The Lives of the Sophists. Trans. Wright, W.C. Cambridge: Harvard University Press, 1961.
- G.W. Bowersock, Greek Sophists in the Roman Empire. (1969 Oxford)
- Kai Brodersen (ed.): Philostratos. Leben der Sophisten. Greek and German. Wiesbaden: Marix, 2014 ISBN 978-3-86539-368-5
- Brodersen, Isidor (2023). Das Spiel mit der Vergangenheit in der Zweiten Sophistik. Stuttgart: Franz Steiner Verlag. ISBN 9783515135344.
- Jaap-Jan Flinterman, Power, paideia & pythagoreanism. Greek identity, conceptions of the relationship between philosophers and monarchs and political ideas in Philostratus' Life of Apollonius (1995 Amsterdam)
- Maud Gleason, Making Men: Sophists and Self-Presentation in Ancient Rome (1995)
- Guast, William (2023). Greek declamation and the Roman Empire. Cambridge; New York: Cambridge University Press. ISBN 9781009297127.
- Simon Swain, Hellenism and Empire. Language, Classicism and Power in the Greek World, AD 50-250 (1996 Oxford)
- Tim Whitmarsh, The Second Sophistic (2005 Oxford)
- Tim Whitmarsh, Greek Literature and the Roman Empire (2001 Oxford)
- The Cambridge Ancient History. Vol. XI. 2nd Ed. Cambridge, UK: Cambridge University Press, 2000.
