= Philostratus =

3rd century Greco-Roman sophist

Philostratus or Lucius Flavius Philostratus (/fɪˈlɒstrətəs/; Ancient Greek: Φιλόστρατος Philostratos; c. 170s – 240s AD), called "the Athenian", was a Greek sophist of the Roman imperial period. His father was a minor sophist of the same name. He flourished during the reign of Septimius Severus (193–211) and died during that of Philip the Arab (244–249), probably in Tyre. He was the biographer of Apollonius of Tyana, and coined the term "Second Sophistic", cataloguing its main figures.

== Name and life ==
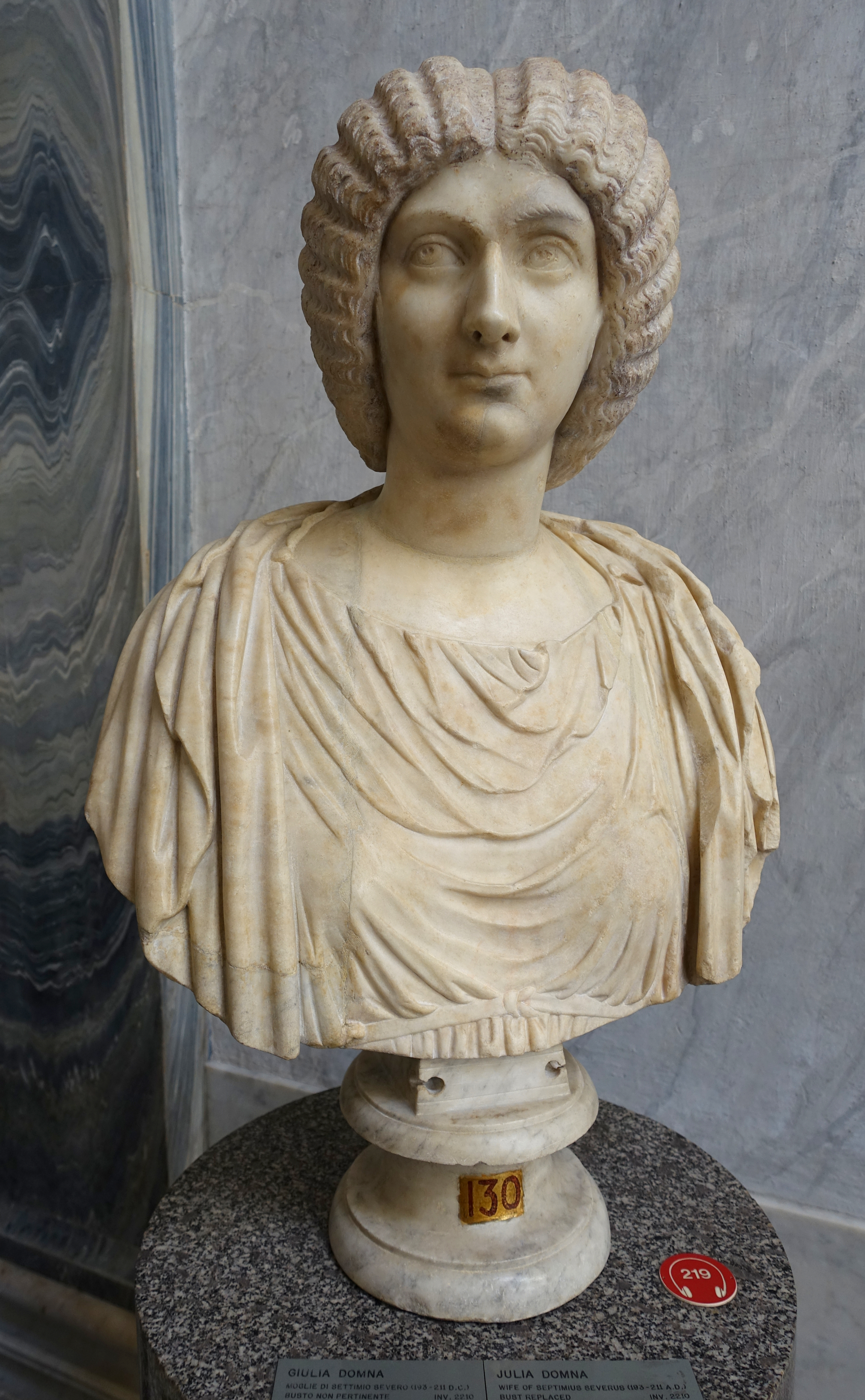
Bust of Julia Domna, Philostratus's patron in the early third century AD

Some ambiguity surrounds his name. The nomen Flavius is given in The Lives of the Sophists and Tzetzes. Eunapius and Synesius call him a Lemnian; Photius a Tyrian; his letters refer to him as an Athenian. His praenomen was probably Lucius, although this is not entirely confirmed.

It is probable that he was born in Lemnos, studied and taught at Athens, and then settled in Rome (where he would naturally be called Atheniensis) as a member of the learned circle with which empress Julia Domna surrounded herself.

== Works attributed to Philostratus ==
Historians agree that Philostratus authored at least five works: Life of Apollonius of Tyana (Τὰ ἐς τὸν Τυανέα Ἀπολλώνιον; Latin: Vita Apollonii), Lives of the Sophists (Ancient Greek: Βίοι Σοφιστῶν, Latin: Vitae Sophistarum), Gymnasticus (Γυμναστικός), Heroicus (Ἡρωικός) and Epistolae (Ἐπιστολαί). Another work, Imagines (Εἰκόνες), is usually assigned to his son-in-law Philostratus of Lemnos.

Heroicus (On Heroes, 213–214 AD) is in the form of a dialogue between a Phoenician traveler and a vine-tender or groundskeeper (ἀμπελουργός ampelourgos), regarding Protesilaus (or "Protosilaos"), the first Achaean warrior to be killed at the siege of Troy, as described in the Iliad. The dialogue extends into a discussion and critique of Homer's presentation of heroes and gods, based on the greater authority of the dead Protosileus, who lives after death and communicates with the ampelourgos. Heroicus includes Achilles's "Ode to Echo".

Life of Apollonius of Tyana, written between 217 and 238 AD, tells the story of Apollonius of Tyana (c. 15 – c. 100 AD), a Pythagorean philosopher and teacher. Philostratus wrote the book for Julia Domna, wife of Septimius Severus and mother of Caracalla. The book was completed after her death.

Lives of the Sophists, written between 231 and 237 AD, is a semi-biographical history of the Greek sophists. The book is dedicated to a consul Antonius Gordianus, perhaps one of the two Gordians who were killed in 238. The work is divided into two parts: the first dealing with the ancient Sophists, e.g. Gorgias, the second with the later school, e.g. Herodes Atticus. The Lives are not in the true sense biographical, but rather picturesque impressions of leading representatives of an attitude of mind full of curiosity, alert and versatile, but lacking scientific method, preferring the external excellence of style and manner to the solid achievements of serious writing. The philosopher, as he says, investigates truth; the sophist embellishes it, and takes it for granted.

Gymnasticus, written after 220 AD, contains accounts concerning the Olympic Games and athletic contests in general.

Epistolae, or Love Letters, breathe the spirit of the New Comedy and the Alexandrine poets; portions of Letter 33 are almost literally translated in Ben Jonson's Song to Celia, "Drink to Me Only with Thine Eyes." The letters are mainly of an erotic character. Their publication date is unknown.

== Translations ==
- Alciphron, Aelian, and Philostratus, The Letters. Translated by A. R. Benner, F. H. Fobes. 1949. Loeb Classical Library. ISBN 978-0-674-99421-8
- Philostratus, Lives of the Sophists. Eunapius, Lives of the Philosophers and Sophists. Translated by Wilmer C. Wright. 1921. Loeb Classical Library. ISBN 978-0-674-99149-1
- Philostratus, Apollonius of Tyana. 3 volumes. Translated by Christopher P. Jones. 2005–6. Loeb Classical Library. ISBN 978-0-674-99613-7, ISBN 978-0-674-99614-4, and ISBN 978-0-674-99617-5
- Philostratus, Heroicus; Gymnasticus; Discourses 1 and 2. Edited and translated by Jeffrey Rusten and Jason König. Loeb Classical Library. (Cambridge, Massachusetts and London, England, 2014).
- Philostratos, Leben der Sophisten. Greek and German by Kai Brodersen. Wiesbaden: Marix 2014, ISBN 978-3-86539-368-5
- Philostratos, Sport in der Antike (Peri Gymnastikes). Greek and German by Kai Brodersen. Wiesbaden: Marix, 2015, ISBN 978-3-7374-0961-2.
