= Vedia gens =

Ancient Roman family

The gens Vedia was a minor plebeian family of equestrian rank at ancient Rome. Only a few members of this gens are mentioned by Roman writers.

== Members ==
This list includes abbreviated praenomina. For an explanation of this practice, see filiation.

- Publius Vedius, a close friend of Pompeius, whom Cicero describes as an extravagant fool and a rascal. While he was meeting with Cicero, his baggage left with his host, Pompeius Vindullus, at Laodicea, Vindullus died, and Gaius Vennonius, securing the estate, discovered compromising portraits in Vedius' belongings.
- Vedius Rufus, the son of a freedman, attained equestrian status, and held public office, rising as far as military tribune. Horace's fourth epode is thought to have been inspired by him.
- Publius Vedius P. f. Pollio, the son of a freedman, was an immensely wealthy eques, and a friend of Augustus. Known for his cruelty, he incurred the emperor's wrath by ordering the death of a slave for breaking a crystal goblet. Augustus is said to have written insulting verses about Pollio.
- Vedius Aquila, commander of the Legio XIII Gemina, led part of Otho's forces at the First Battle of Bedriacum, where they were defeated by Vitellius in AD 69. Later he was a supporter of Vespasian.
- Marcus Claudius Publius Vedius Antoninus Sabinus, the grandfather of Publius Vedius Antoninus, one of the leading citizens of Ephesus.
- Marcus Claudius Publius Vedius P. f. Antoninus Phaedrus Sabinianus, the father of Publius Vedius Antoninus, one of the leading citizens of Ephesus.
- Publius Vedius P. f. P. n. Antoninus, one of the decurions of Ephesus, where he constructed an odeon, a gymnasium, and a Hadrianeum. Lucius Verus visited Vedius' estate on his way to campaign against the Parthians in AD 162. Vedius was the father-in-law of the philosopher Damian of Ephesus.
- Vedia P. f. P. n., daughter of the decurion Publius Vedius Antoninus, and wife of the philosopher Damian of Ephesus.

== See also ==
- List of Roman gentes

== Bibliography ==
=== Ancient sources ===
- Marcus Tullius Cicero, Epistulae ad Atticum.
- Lucius Annaeus Seneca (Seneca the Younger), De Ira (On Anger); De Clementia (On Clemency).
- Gaius Plinius Secundus (Pliny the Elder), Historia Naturalis (Natural History).
- Publius Cornelius Tacitus, Annales, Historiae.
- Lucius Cassius Dio, Roman History.
- Macrobius Ambrosius Theodosius, Saturnalia.

=== Modern sources ===
- Dictionary of Greek and Roman Biography and Mythology, William Smith, ed., Little, Brown and Company, Boston (1849).
- Paul von Rohden, Elimar Klebs, & Hermann Dessau, Prosopographia Imperii Romani (The Prosopography of the Roman Empire, abbreviated PIR), Berlin (1898).
