= Philosophy of Marcus Aurelius =

Ideas of 2nd-century Roman emporer and philosopher

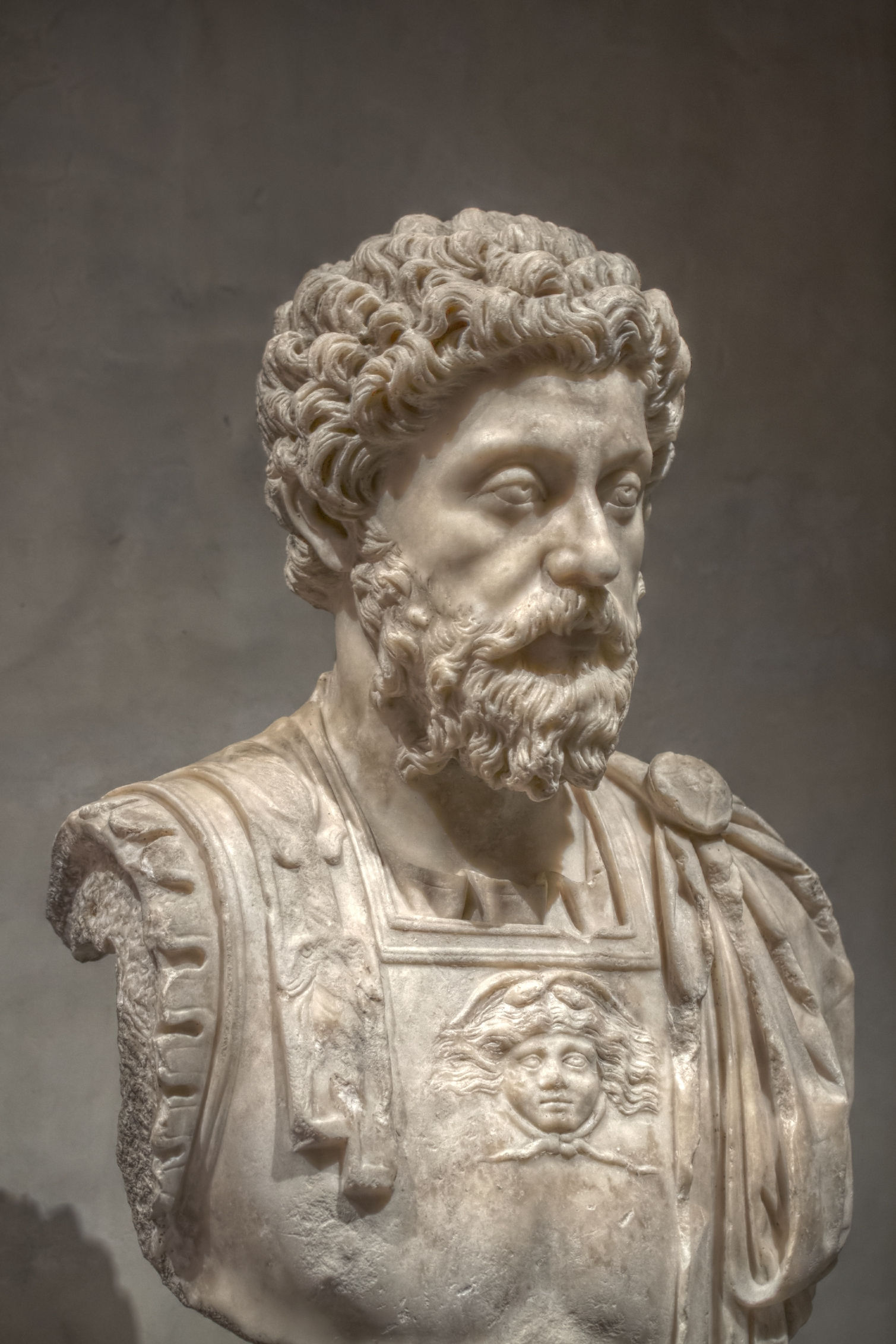
Bust of Emperor Marcus Aurelius (Roman period, found in the Roman villa of Chiragan, now preserved at the Musée Saint-Raymond in Toulouse), considered one of the greatest representatives of Roman Stoicism (new Stoa).

The philosophical thought of the Roman Emperor Marcus Aurelius represents the reflection of the last great exponent of the Stoic doctrine, belonging to the so-called new Stoa or "Roman Stoicism".

His philosophy retraces the Stoic attitude, starting from the withdrawal into oneself, aided by political activism, following the Fate. The celebration of interiority is clearly evident from the title of his only written work, the Meditations, also known as Thoughts, Memoirs, or To Himself.

Marcus Aurelius wrote the twelve books that make up the work between 170 and 180, during breaks from his numerous travels, in Greek of the koinè, as an exercise for his own guidance and self-improvement, influenced by some of his youth teachers who had pushed him towards philosophy; among them Quintus Junius Rusticus, Diognetus, Claudius Maximus, and Apollonius of Chalcedon, remembered in Book I. The literary style is inspired by that of the grammarian Alexander of Cotiaeum, another of his tutors, as Marcus himself recalls. The title of this work was a posthumous addition; originally, Marcus titled the work To Himself, but it is not known if he intended to make it public. The Thoughts demonstrate a logical mind, and his notes are representative of Stoic philosophy and its spirituality, also offering a fine and detailed psychological portrait. The book is considered one of the literary and philosophical masterpieces of all time.

== Philosophical formation ==
Marcus Aurelius's education took place at home: in line with the aristocratic trends of the time, his great-grandfather Severus encouraged him to avoid public schools. One of his teachers, Diognetus, proved particularly influential, introducing Marcus to a philosophical view of life and teaching him rationality. In April 132, at the behest of Diognetus (identified by some as the recipient of the letter Epistle to Diognetus), Marcus began to wear the clothes and adopt the habits typical of philosophers: while studying, he wore a rough Greek cloak, and he slept on the ground until his mother convinced him to sleep on a bed.

A new series of preceptors, the grammarian Alexander of Cotiaeum, Trosius Aper, and Tuticius Proculus continued to take care of his education in 132–133. Little is known about these last two teachers (both of Latin), while Alexander is described as an important literary figure of his time. Marcus thanks Alexander for his training in literary style, evident in many passages of the Meditations.

After donning the toga virilis in 136, he probably began his oratorical training. He had three Greek teachers, Aninus Macer, Caninius Celer, and Herodes Atticus, and one Latin teacher, Marcus Cornelius Fronto, whom Marcus often remembers as his teacher of style and life in the Meditations. Fronto and Atticus, however, became his tutors only after his adoption by Antoninus in 138. The preponderance of Greek tutors indicates the importance of the language for the Roman aristocracy. This was the age of the Second Sophistic, a revival of Greek literature. Although educated in Rome, Marcus would write part of the Meditations in Greek.

Fronto was considered, as an orator, second only to Cicero, or on par with the "glory of Roman eloquence", a fame that today, based on the few remaining fragments, may leave one astonished. He had no sympathy for Herodes, although Marcus eventually managed to establish good relations between them. Fronto had complete mastery of Latin and, skilled in word choice, was capable of formulating unusual expressions through literary art. A significant amount of correspondence between Fronto and Marcus has survived to us. The two were very close; Marcus called him "my dear Fronto" and "my joy" and also spent a lot of time with his wife and daughter, both named Cratia, in casual conversations.

On the occasion of the imperial ascent of his pupils, Marcus and Lucius Verus, Fronto left his home in Cirta and on 28 March returned to his Roman residence. He sent a note to the imperial freedman Charilas, asking to be able to contact the emperors because, he said later, he had not dared to write directly to the emperors. The teacher showed immense pride in his pupils: reflecting on the speech given for the ascent to the consulship in 143, where he praised the young Marcus, Fronto was enthusiastic: "There was then an extraordinary natural ability in you, now perfected into excellence; the growing grain is now a ripe harvest".

It is known that Marcus, once he became emperor, discussed with Fronto his reading of Coelius and Cicero, and of his family. His daughters were in the house in Rome, with their great-aunt Vibia Matidia (daughter of Salonina Matidia, a direct relative of Hadrian and Trajan), because the emperor thought the evening air was too cold for them. He asked Fronto to provide him with "some readings of eloquence, something of yours, or of Cato, or Cicero, Sallust, or Gracchus, or a poet, because I need distractions, especially at this time, reading something that dispels my urgent anxieties".

In another occasion, Marcus wrote Fronto a letter for his birthday, stating that he loved him as he loved himself and appealing to the gods that all his literary knowledge be learned "from Fronto's lips". His prayers for Fronto's health were more than a conventional act (because Fronto was often ill and sometimes seemed to suffer from a constant infirmity), so much so that he asked to share Fronto's pain himself.

Fronto did not become Marcus's full-time teacher and continued his career as a lawyer. A case brought him into conflict with Herodes, who was the main accuser of Tiberius Claudius Demostratus, an Athenian notable defended by Fronto. Due to his conflicted relations with the city of Athens, the defense strategy would probably have attacked Herodes's character. Marcus had begged Fronto, first "advising him", then "asking him the favor" not to attack Herodes, whom he had already asked to refrain from striking the first blows. Fronto declared himself surprised to discover that Marcus considered Herodes as a friend (perhaps because Herodes was not yet his tutor), but acknowledged that Marcus might be right in asking that the case not turn into a spectacle. Nevertheless, he confirmed his intention to use the material at his disposal: "I warn you that I will not use the opportunity that presents itself in this case disproportionately, since the accusations are terrible and must be spoken of in these terms. Especially those events that refer to beatings and robberies, I will expose them in all their gravity, but even if I accuse him of being an uncultured little Greek, I will not intend war to the death". Marcus was satisfied with this response from Fronto.

The outcome of the trial is unknown, but Marcus managed to reconcile the two. Subsequently, Herodes became consul ordinarius, while in July and August of 143, Fronto was appointed consul suffectus. Marcus wrote to him informing him that Herodes's last-born had just died and invited him to express his condolences. Fronto therefore wrote him a letter, in Greek, partly preserved. Fronto also praised Marcus for his talent as a mediator: "if anyone has ever had the power from his character to bring all his friends together in mutual concord, you would succeed with extreme ease".

At the age of twenty-five, Marcus began to lose interest in legal studies, showing signs of widespread malaise. He was tired of his exercises and of taking positions in imaginary debates. When he criticized the insincerity of conventional language, Fronto took to defending it. In any case, Marcus's formal education was now over. He had maintained good relations with his teachers, still following them with devotion, even though the long education had negatively affected his health.

Initially, Fronto had warned Marcus against studying philosophy: "it is better never to have undertaken the study of philosophy than to have tasted it, with the tip of the tongue, as they say". He disapproved of his lessons with Apollonius of Chalcedon. Another philosophy teacher whom Marcus remembers in his writings is Claudius Maximus, a philosopher and politician.

Quintus Junius Rusticus also had influence on the boy; Rusticus was twenty years older than Marcus and was only slightly older than Fronto himself. As the grandson of Quintus Junius Arulenus Rusticus, one of the martyrs of Domitian's tyranny and his persecution against philosophers (Arulenus had been condemned to death for treason, for heavily criticizing Domitian himself in a book focused on Thrasea Paetus), he was heir to the tradition of Stoic opposition to the "bad emperors" of the 1st century and considered the true successor of Seneca. Rusticus had been consul suffectus in 133; later, Marcus appointed him consul ordinarius in 162, as well as Praefectus urbi in the years following 162. Marcus thanked Rusticus on numerous occasions for his teaching. In addition to Rusticus, Marcus was probably inspired by reading Arrian, to whom we owe the transcriptions of the lessons of his master (whom Marcus did not know due to age), Epictetus of Hierapolis (a pupil of Gaius Musonius Rufus and friend of Hadrian); it was Rusticus who suggested these readings to him.

== Chronology of writings ==
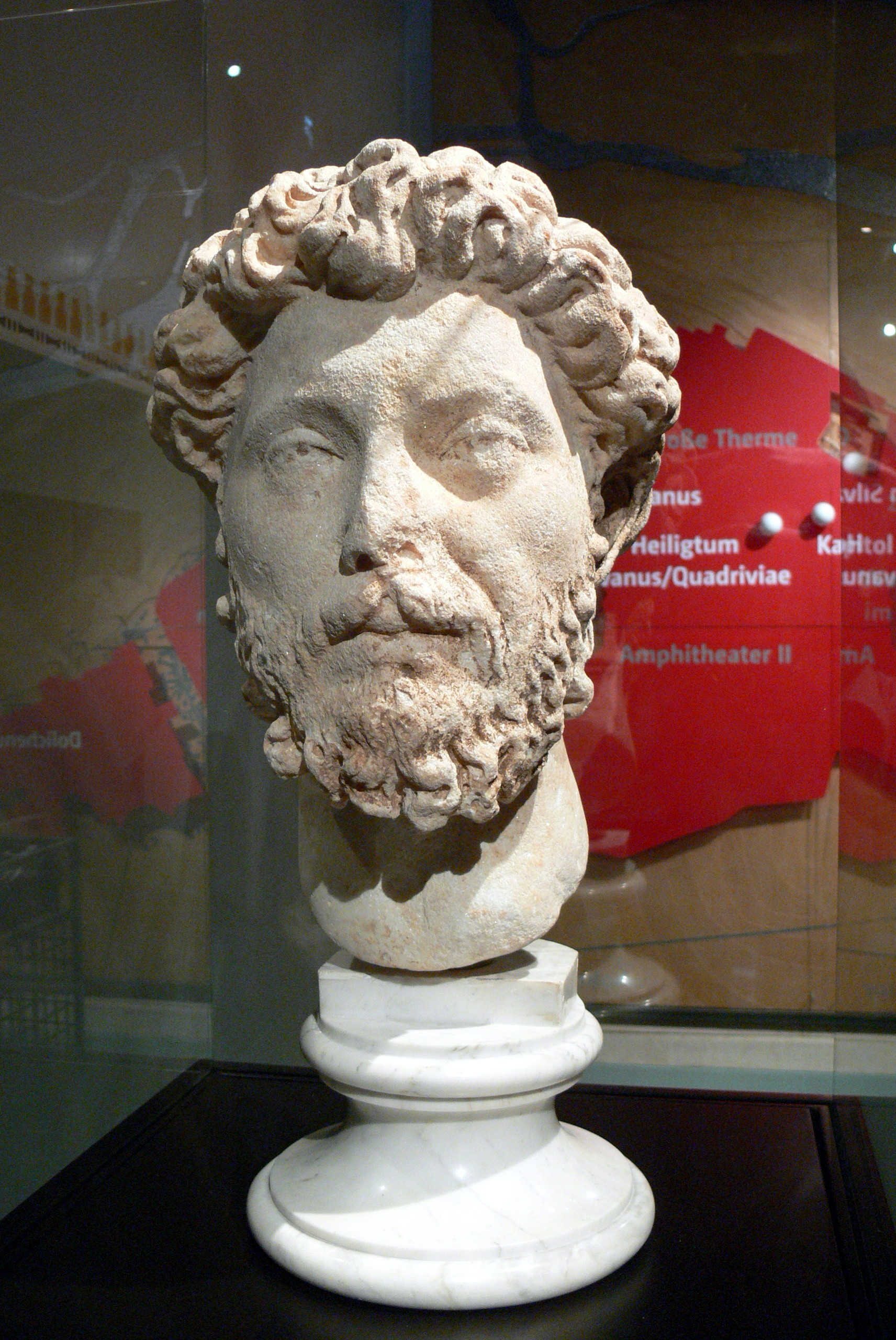
Bust of Marcus Aurelius found at Carnuntum, where the "philosopher emperor" wrote the second book of the Meditations.

Many modern authors believe that the first of these books, written on the Granua (the current Hron river, in Slovakia), constitutes a kind of inner testament, where Marcus Aurelius remembered all the important people in his life - such as his parents, grandparents, adoptive father Antoninus Pius, wife Faustina, children (particularly Commodus and Verus), friends, and all his literary and philosophical teachers - in autobiographical form, perhaps datable to 179, a few months before his death.

Book II, written at Carnuntum, also considered to be of later dating, may have been written in 178, and most importantly, represent the key to a possible chronological interpretation of the work.

In this case, it would be hypothesized a chronology in which the first book is datable to 179 and the last, XII, to 168–170, at the time of the death of his fraternal friend and teacher of rhetoric, Marcus Cornelius Fronto (170), and shortly after that of his son-in-law, co-emperor, and adoptive brother, Lucius Verus. Moreover, the theme of death recurs in this XII book, in the passage placed as the conclusion of the entire work:

Man, you have been a citizen in this great city: what does it matter to you if for five years or a hundred? What is according to the laws has equal value for everyone. What is serious, then, if you are expelled from the city not by a tyrant or an unjust judge, but by nature that had introduced you there? (...) For it is he who was then responsible for the composition, now for the dissolution, who establishes that the drama is complete; you, on the other hand, are responsible neither for the one nor for the other. Therefore, depart serene: he who dismisses you is serene.

— Marcus Aurelius. "12.36". Meditations.

== Philosophical positions ==
Marcus seems to take up the classical Stoic positions, from Zeno to Epictetus, emphasizing the sense of human powerlessness in the face of divinity and destiny, and the superficiality of human representations, whereby what matters is not the thing as it is, but as we perceive it. He let himself be guided by philosophy even during the difficulties faced in his public and personal life (such as the death of many of his children at a young age; out of thirteen, only five reached adulthood), as much as he could, being a statesman, follow the path of the philosopher.

=== Acceptance of duty ===
Faced with the meaninglessness of the world and its fleeting realities, the only path left to the wise man is withdrawal into oneself, which gives meaning to one's individual existence, applying Stoic philosophy and thus achieving the mastery over passions. Marcus Aurelius seems to express a strong pessimism about human fate, withdrawing into himself through a form of melancholy meditation, and remaining partially prey to his existential doubts.

Be like the promontory against which the waves continually break: it stands firm, and around it the boiling waters calm down. "Unfortunate me, this has happened to me." Not at all! Rather: "Fortunate me, because even though this has happened to me, I endure without feeling pain, without being broken by the present and without fearing the future." For such a thing could have happened to anyone, but not everyone would have been able to endure without yielding to pain. So why see in that a misfortune rather than in this a fortune?

— Marcus Aurelius. "4.49". Meditations.

In 149, Faustina gave birth to twins, celebrated by a coin with crossed cornucopias under the busts of the two children and the inscription felicity of the times. However, they did not survive long. Titus Aurelius Antoninus and Tiberius Aelius Aurelius, these are the names derived from the epitaphs, died very early (before 152) and were buried in the Mausoleum of Hadrian.

Marcus himself wrote: "One prays: «may I not lose my son!»; but you must pray: «may I not fear losing him!»" He cited from the Iliad what he called "the phrase that everyone knows, to remember to be a stranger to pain and fear": «Leaves, some the wind scatters on the ground (...), so the race of men» (Iliad 6,146).

=== Rational soul and human destiny ===
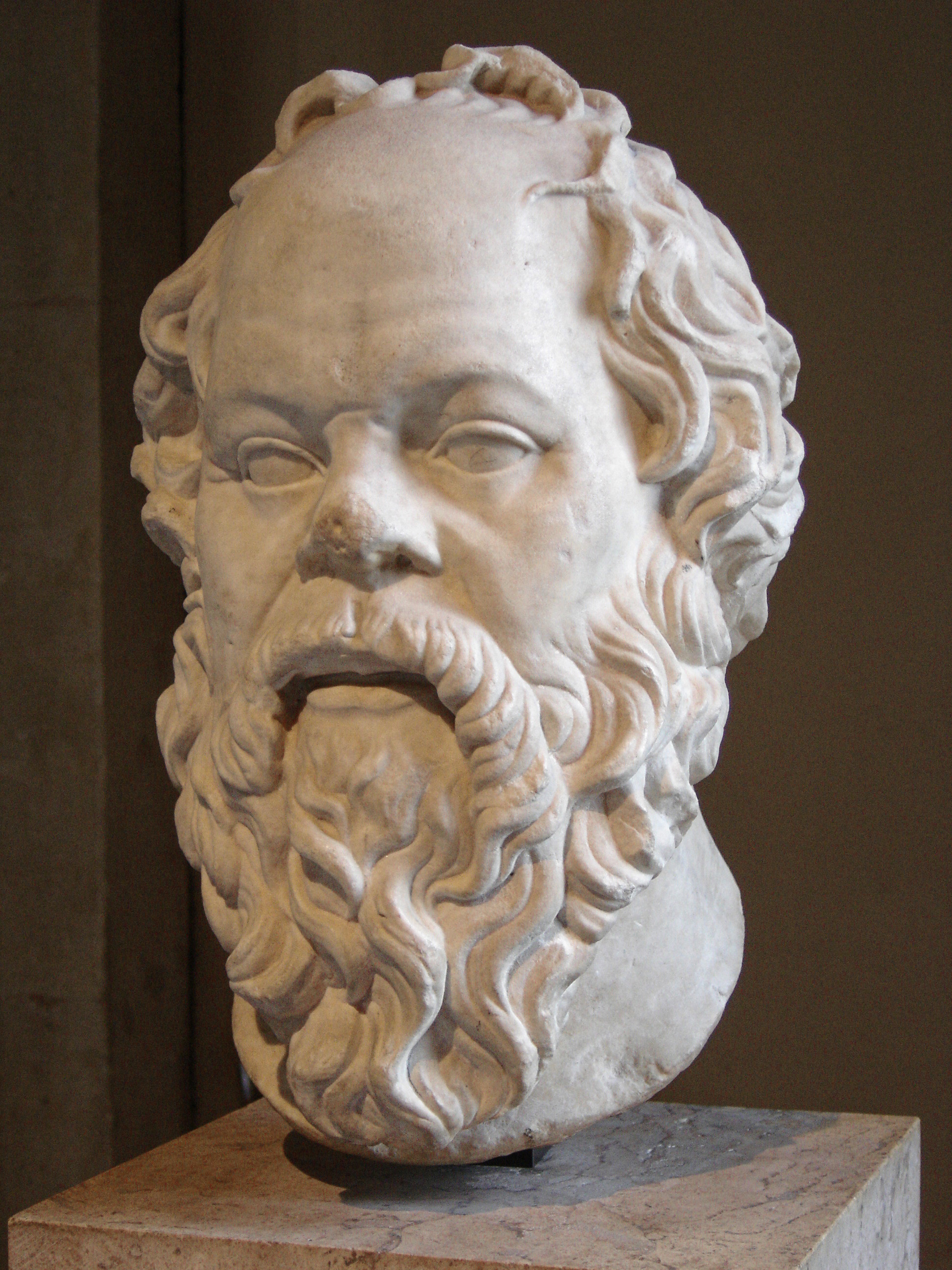
Socrates, often remembered in Marcus Aurelius's writings

As in Seneca, for Marcus Aurelius the soul is distinct and separate from the body but it is further composed of the soul proper, understood as spirit, the pneuma or vital breath, and the intellect or governing principle, the seat of spiritual activity. Marcus often cites Epictetus, with references to diairesi (understanding the nature of things, whether they can be influenced by human will or not) and to proairesis (the practical division into things within our power or "others'"), the human rational faculties that enable discernment and understanding of rational and irrational phenomena, what to flee from or adapt to, or not, and he also refers to non-Stoic philosophers, such as Socrates (seen as an example of moral rectitude, acceptance of destiny, and wisdom, despite the pettiness of his adversaries), Epicurus, Plato, Democritus, Heraclitus, and others as examples of great men, but also of the transience of glory and uncertainty about the true destiny of the human soul, even of those great men themselves:

Hippocrates himself, after curing many diseases, fell ill and died. The Chaldeans predicted the deaths of many, and then fate caught them. Even Alexander, Pompey, and Gaius Caesar, after valiantly conquering entire cities, after routing many thousands of cavalry and infantry, left life. Heraclitus, once he had speculated in such (admirable) a manner about the conflagration of the cosmos, when his bowels filled with water, smeared with dung, died. Lice killed Democritus, lice of another kind Socrates. And then? You embarked, you sailed, you landed: disembark, then. If it is for another life, certainly you will find nothing there devoid of gods. If, instead, it is in the condition where you will perceive nothing more, finally pleasures and pains will cease for you.

— Marcus Aurelius. "3.3". Meditations.

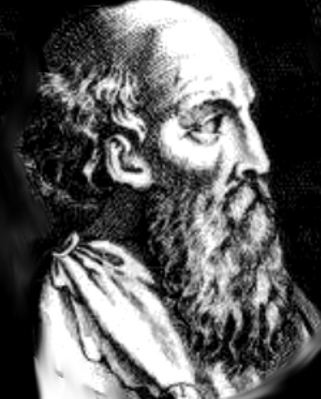
Epictetus

=== Inner investigation ===
He seems to conform to the supreme reasons that govern the world, as a wise man and philosopher, while tending in this writing to escape from the world and the materiality of life. Combining Stoic certainties with his human doubts, he takes refuge in thought, changing what can be changed and accepting the Fate, taking care to consider worthy of attention only "proairetic" things, that is, those on which one can truly influence, consoling himself with philosophy for the rest:

Deliver yourself spontaneously to Clotho, letting her weave you with whatever fact she wishes.

— Marcus Aurelius. "4.34". Meditations.

Look behind you at the abyss of eternity and in front of you another infinity. In this dimension, what difference is there between living three days or three times the years of Nestor?

— Marcus Aurelius. "4.50". Meditations.

=== Writing as refuge ===
In his role as emperor, he performs his duty regarding his political role, but he feels the uselessness of actions that will not change the irrationality that troubles many events in the world:

Immediately turn your gaze to the other side, to the rapidity of oblivion that envelops all things, to the abyss of infinite time, to the vanity of all that great clamor, to the fickleness and superficiality of all those who seem to applaud... In short, always keep in mind this retreat that you have at your disposal, in this your own little field.

— Marcus Aurelius. "4.3". Meditations.

== Influence on political conception ==
Marcus had the reputation of a philosopher-king already during his lifetime. He could not implement all his ideals due to the contrast between his figure as an intellectual and philosopher and that of an emperor, head of an empire based on the strength of the legions, violence, and the severity of the law. Of this contrast, a trace of bitterness remains in the Memoirs, for not having been able to do more, for not being able to reconcile the life of the philosopher with that of the emperor, and since the work was written for personal purposes and not for propaganda, it is very likely that he experienced this contrast with suffering and discomfort. Nevertheless, he lived more austerely than a Roman noble of the time, striving to show the clemency of the Stoic on every occasion, but he also endorsed acts of violence, such as the Marcomannic War or the religious persecutions. He often sought to cultivate humility, not to be carried away by the enthusiasm of absolute power, not to emphasize any aspect of himself, warning himself against transforming into "another Caesar", as he writes. According to the biographer of the Historia Augusta, it seems that Marcus showed, at least initially, all his reluctance to take on imperial power, and that he was "forced by the Senate to assume the direction of the Res publica after Pius's death". He must have had a real fear of imperial power (horror imperii), considering his predilection for the philosophical life, but he knew, as a Stoic, what he had to do and how to do it.

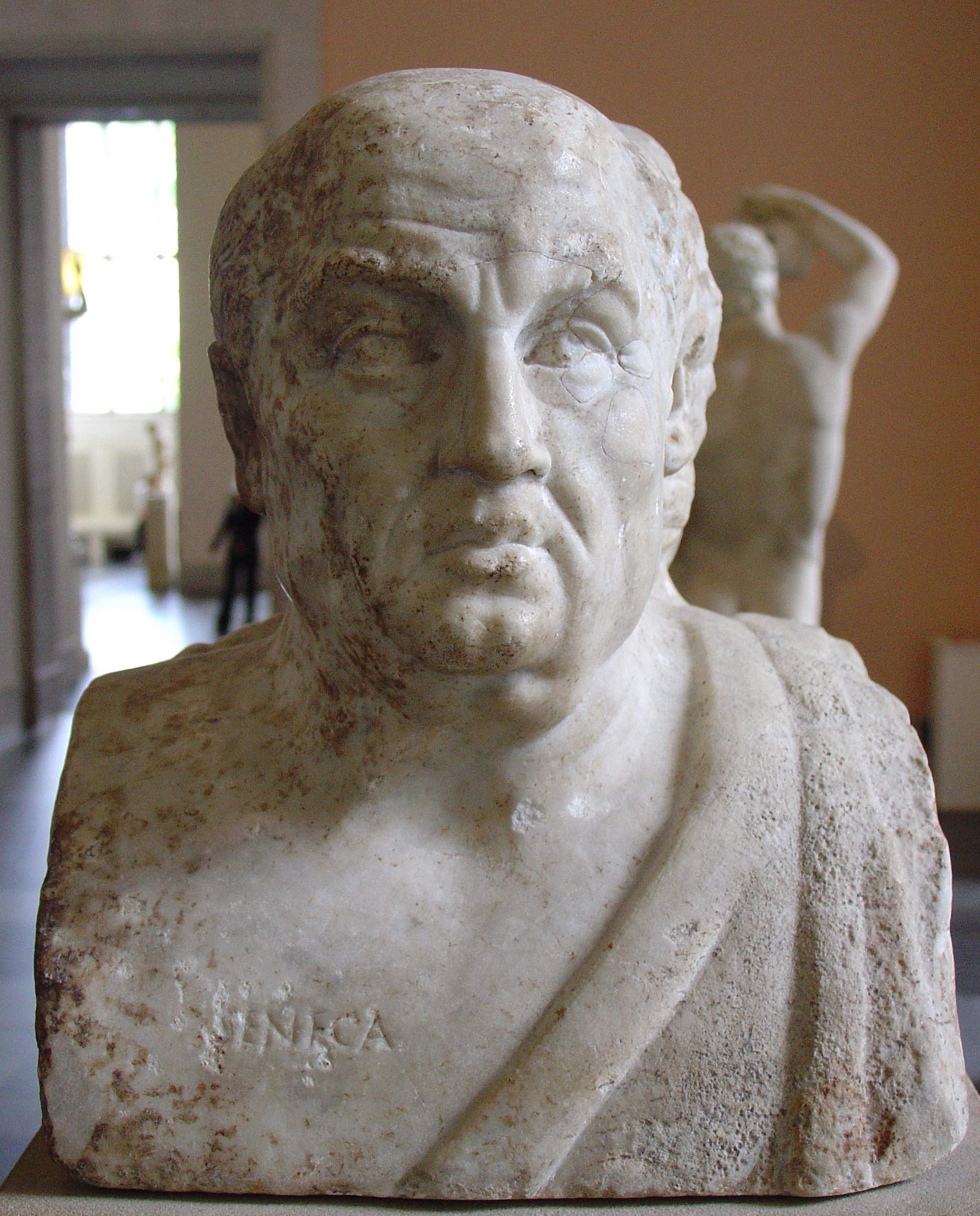
Bust of Seneca, from whom Marcus drew inspiration for his philosophy

Although torture and the death penalty were in force in Rome, easily applied especially against slaves and foreigners, the legislation of many emperors sought to mitigate or reduce the types of crimes punishable by heavy penalties, as Titus had already done in the past. For Marcus, following Seneca (and going even beyond what the latter wrote) and the Greek philosophers, men were united by a universal brotherhood, as participants in the Logos, guided by the dáimon, "divine fragment that Zeus gave to each man as his defender or guide": this "humanitarian" vision of the Stoics would be one of the bases of the idea of human rights many centuries later, since for the Stoa (as for the Platonists, moreover) there is a law of nature that overrides the law of human nations, just as it is surprising to find in Marcus Aurelius an invitation to universalistic tolerance and forgiveness, not in a Christian sense but as fidelity to the so-called humanitas, which he sought to transfer from philosophy to practice.

In the morning, begin by saying to yourself: I will meet an indiscreet person, an ungrateful one, a bully, an impostor, an envious one, a selfish one. Their behavior always stems from ignorance of what is good and what is evil. As for me, since, reflecting on the nature of good and evil, I have concluded that they are respectively what is beautiful or ugly in a moral sense, and, reflecting on the nature of the wrongdoer, I have concluded that he is my relative, not because he comes from the same blood or the same seed, but because he shares in intellect and a particle of the divine, well, I cannot be harmed by any of them because none can involve me in turpitudes, nor can I be angry with a relative or hate him. For we are born for collaboration, like feet, hands, eyelids, upper and lower teeth. Therefore, acting against each other is against nature: and getting angry and disdainfully rejecting someone is acting against him.

— Marcus Aurelius. "2.1". Meditations.

Following what Seneca and the former slave Epictetus maintained, Marcus adopted the morality according to which even slaves are not objects, but persons who, although subordinate, are collaborators of the master, and "spiritually" remain always free. They should therefore be treated by avoiding any cruelty and respecting their dignity. Unlike the Christians themselves, who often did not spend words in favor of the servile class, the philosophical-juridical movement linked to the Antonine policy of manumission, according to some, if it had not been deeply anchored to the Roman economic system that was totally based on slavery, would have led to the de facto abolition of the servile institution within a century.

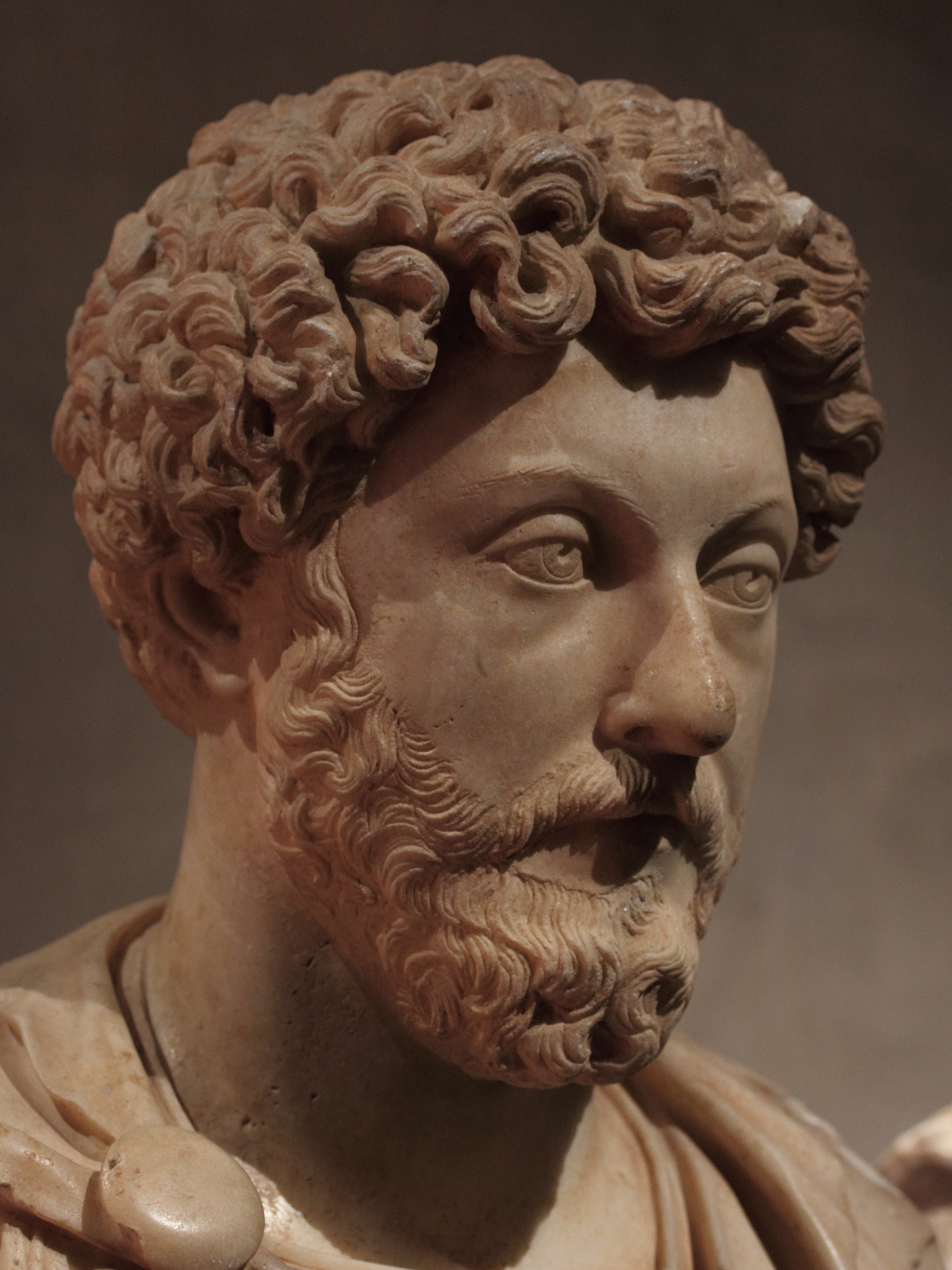
Bust of Marcus Aurelius (detail).

Marcus showed interest in ensuring that every slave was given the opportunity to regain his freedom, if the master had expressed his willingness to restore it to him. It is said, in fact, that in a case of manumission, brought to his attention by his friend Aufidius Victorinus, and later cited by jurists as a decisive precedent, he favored a slave. Consistent with Stoicism, a philosophy opposed to slavery, he issued numerous regulations favorable to the servile class, extending the laws already promulgated by his predecessors, starting with Trajan, and reaffirming, for example, the concept of right of asylum for fugitive slaves (who could be punished and killed in any way by the master), guaranteeing them immunity as long as they were near any temple or any statue of the emperor.

== Legacy ==
The Meditations are still valued as literature and biography, as well as a philosophical work that encapsulates the main maxims of Stoicism, and like the previous Enchiridion and the Discourses of Epictetus, often remembered in the Memoirs, and the works of Seneca, they were a source of inspiration for many personalities, composing almost a "gospel of the pagans" or a universal "art of living". The book was among the readings of Frederick the Great, enlightened monarch of the 18th century - being admired by many intellectuals throughout the Enlightenment era -, Francis Hutcheson, John Stuart Mill, Matthew Arnold, Goethe, Giacomo Leopardi (who defined them as "philosophy on the throne"), Arthur Schopenhauer, Emil Cioran, Leo Tolstoy (who had them printed in an economical edition for the Russian people), Simone Weil, Michel Onfray, Wen Jiabao, and Bill Clinton.

It is not known to what extent and since when Marcus's writings were disseminated after his death. There are scattered references in ancient literature to the popularity of his precepts, and Emperor Julian was well aware of Marcus's reputation as a philosopher, although he does not specifically mention the Meditations. The book itself, although cited in correspondence by Arethas of Caesarea (who claimed to have a barely legible copy, not Marcus's original, but a later copy from the Byzantine early medieval period, about 600–700 years after the Antonine period) in the 10th century and in the Byzantine Suda, was published in full, as a print, in 1558 in Zurich by Wilhelm Holzmann, from a manuscript copy that is now lost. The only other complete surviving manuscript copy, the so-called Vaticanus Graecus 1950, is in the Vatican Library, and dates back to the 14th century.

== Bibliography ==
Primary sources

- Aurelius Victor. De Caesaribus [On the Caesars] (in Latin).
- Aurelius Victor. Epitome de Caesaribus [Epitome on the Caesars] (in Latin).
- Julian. I Cesari o I Saturnali [The Caesars or The Saturnalia] (in Italian).
- Cassius Dio. Historia Romana [Roman History] (in Italian).
- Eusebius. Historia Ecclesiastica (Ἐκκλησιαστικῆς ἱστορίας) [Ecclesiastical History] (in Latin).
- Tertullian. Apologeticum [Apologeticus] (in Latin).
- Seneca. Epistole morali a Lucilio [Moral Letters to Lucilius] (in Latin).
- Seneca. De clementia [On Clemency] (PDF) (in Latin). Archived from the original (PDF) on December 12, 2013.
- Historia Augusta. Vite di Adriano, Antonino Pio, Marco Aurelio, Lucio Vero, Avidio Cassio e Commodo [Lives of Hadrian, Antoninus Pius, Marcus Aurelius, Lucius Verus, Avidius Cassius, and Commodus] (in Latin).
- Suetonius. De Vita Caesarum [The Lives of the Twelve Caesars] (in Latin). pp. books I–II–III.

Modern historiographical sources

- Adinolfi, Isabella (2004). Diritti umani: realtà e utopia [Human Rights: Reality and Utopia] (in Italian). Venice: Città Nuova. ISBN 88-311-0139-0.
- Birley, Anthony Richard (1990). Marco Aurelio [Marcus Aurelius] (in Italian). Milan: Rusconi. ISBN 88-18-18011-8.
- Bloch, Marc (1947). "Comme et pourqoi finit l'esclavage antique" [How and Why Ancient Slavery Ended]. Annales. Histoire, Sciences Sociales (in French). 2 (1): 30–44. doi:10.3406/ahess.1947.3257. JSTOR 27578330.
- Cameron, Alan (1967). "Anthony Birley's: "Marcus Aurelius"". Classical Review. 17 (3): 347–350. doi:10.1017/S0009840X00325094.
- Casadei, Thomas; Mattarelli, Sauro (2009). Il senso della repubblica: schiavitù [The Sense of the Republic: Slavery] (in Italian). Rome: Franco Angeli.
- Champlin, Edward (1974). "The Chronology of Fronto". Journal of Roman Studies. 64: 136–159. doi:10.2307/299265. JSTOR 299265.
- Champlin, Edward (1980). Fronto and Antonine Rome. Cambridge: Harvard University Press. ISBN 0-674-32668-7.
- Emil Cioran (2001). Quaderni 1957-1972 [Notebooks 1957-1972] (in Italian). Milan: Adelphi. ISBN 978-88-459-1624-3.
- Costa, Cosimo (2012). L'umano riuscito: una ermeneusi dei 'Ricordi' di Marco Aurelio [The Successful Human: A Hermeneutics of Marcus Aurelius's 'Meditations'] (in Italian). Rome: Anicia.
- Grant, Michael (1968). The Climax of Rome: The Final Achievements of the Ancient World, AD 161-337. Boston: Little, Brown. ISBN 978-0-297-81391-0.
- Grimal, Pierre (2004). Marco Aurelio [Marcus Aurelius] (in Italian). Milan: Garzanti. ISBN 88-11-67702-5.
- Hadot, Pierre; Reale, Giovanni (1996). La cittadella interiore: introduzione ai 'Pensieri' di Marco Aurelio [The Inner Citadel: Introduction to Marcus Aurelius's 'Meditations'] (in Italian). Milan: Vita e Pensiero. ISBN 88-343-0808-5.
- Hays, Gregory (2003). Introduction to Marcus Aurelius Meditations. London: Weidenfeld and Nicolson. ISBN 978-0-415-13814-7.
- Giacomo Leopardi (1898). Zibaldone di pensieri [Scrapbook of Thoughts] (in Italian).
- Tatiana Tolstoj (1978). Anni con mio padre [Years with My Father] (in Italian). Milan: Garzanti.
- Michel Onfray (2009). L'arte di gioire: per un materialismo edonista [The Art of Joy: For a Hedonist Materialism] (in Italian). Rome: Fazi. ISBN 978-88-6411-014-1.
- Perelli, Luciano (1969). Storia della letteratura latina [History of Latin Literature] (in Italian). Turin: Paravia. ISBN 88-395-0255-6.
- Ernest Renan (1937). Marco Aurelio e la fine del mondo antico [Marcus Aurelius and the End of the Ancient World] (in Italian). Milan: Corbaccio.
- Sorabji, Richard (2006). Self: Ancient and Modern Insights about Individuality, Life, and Death. Oxford: Oxford University Press. ISBN 978-0-19-926639-5.
- Stertz, Stephen A. (1977). "Marcus Aurelius as Ideal Emperor in Late-Antique Greek Thought". The Classical World. 70 (7): 433–439. doi:10.2307/4348712. JSTOR 4348712.
- Simone Weil; Joë Bousquet (1994). Adriano Marchetti (ed.). Corrispondenza [Correspondence] (in Italian). Milan: SE. ISBN 88-7710-625-5.
