= Chris Schulenburg (politician) =

German politician (born 1980)

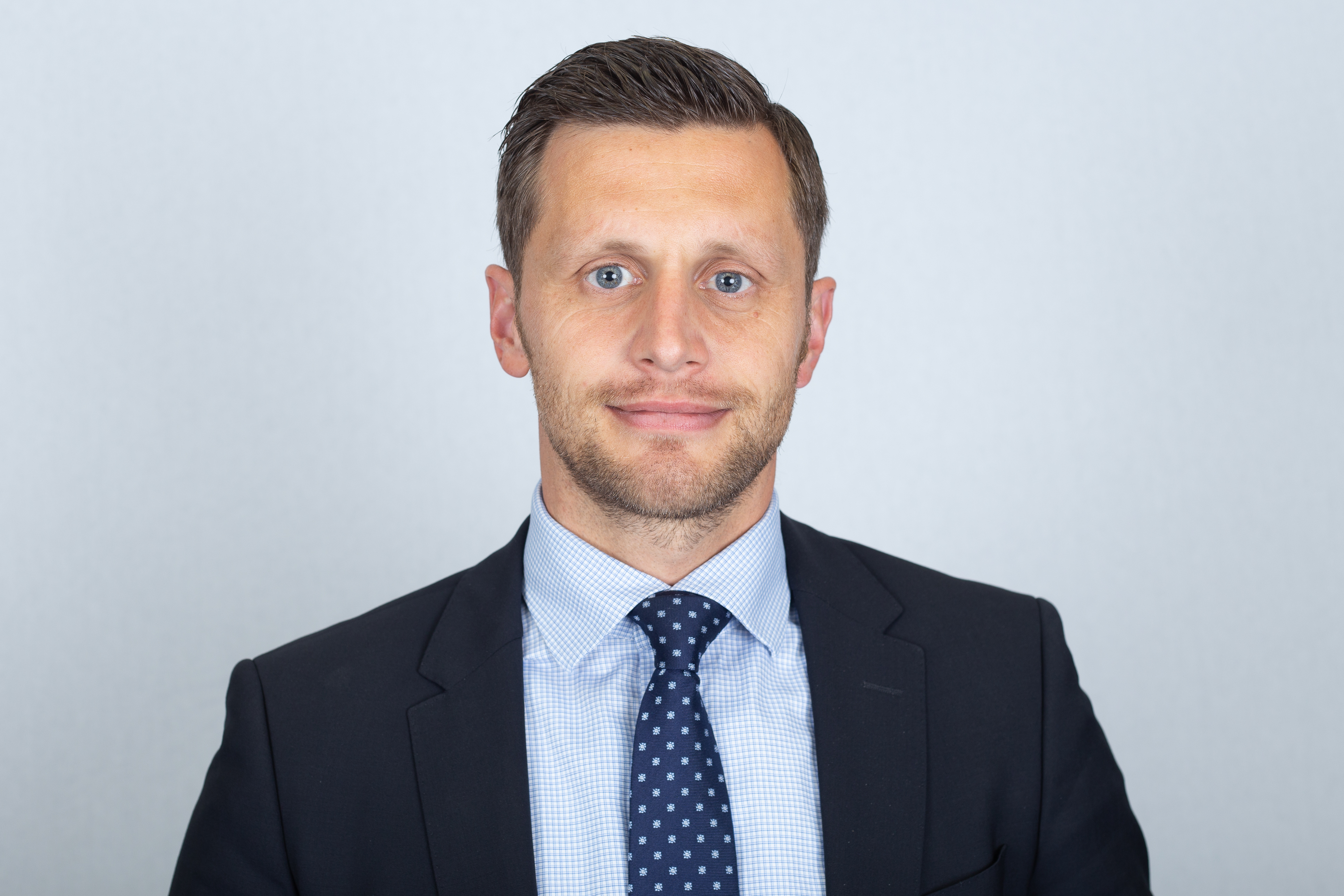
- Schulenburg in 2018

Member of the Landtag of Saxony-Anhalt
- Incumbent
- Assumed office 12 April 2016
- Preceded by: Nico Schulz
- Constituency: Havelberg-Osterburg

Personal details
- Born: 7 June 1980 (age 46) Havelberg
- Party: Christian Democratic Union (since 2002)

Chris Schulenburg (born 7 June 1980 in Havelberg) is a German politician serving as a member of the Landtag of Saxony-Anhalt since 2016. He has served as chairman of the Christian Democratic Union in Stendal since 2017.
