= Willem Canter =

Dutch classical scholar (1542–1575)

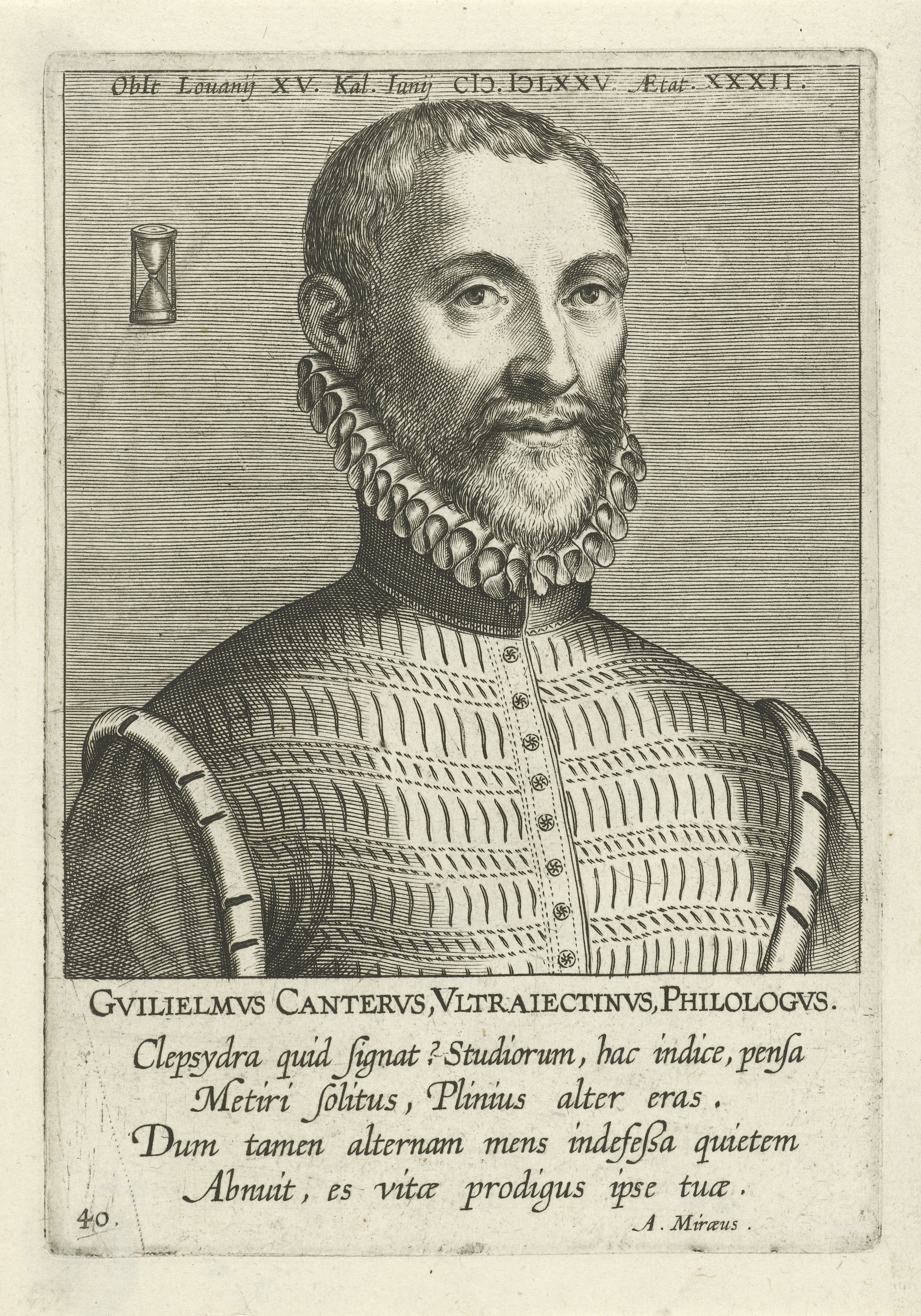
Copper engraving of Willem Canter (c. 1700)

Willem Canter (1542–1575) was a classical scholar from Utrecht. He edited the Eclogues of Stobaeus and the tragedies of Euripides, Sophocles and Aeschylus.

Canter studied under Jean Daurat in Paris before becoming an independent scholar in Louvain. His Ratio emendandi (Basle, 1566) was a guide to editing and textual criticism. He also translated the Sacred Tales of Aelius Aristides into Latin.

== Works ==
- Novae Lectiones, 1564
- Ratio emendandi, 1566
- Evripidis Tragoediae XIX, 1571
- Sophoclis tragoediae VII, 1579
