= Aelius Aristides =

2nd century Greek rhetorician and author

- Πόπλιος Αἴλιος Ἀριστείδης Θεόδωρος
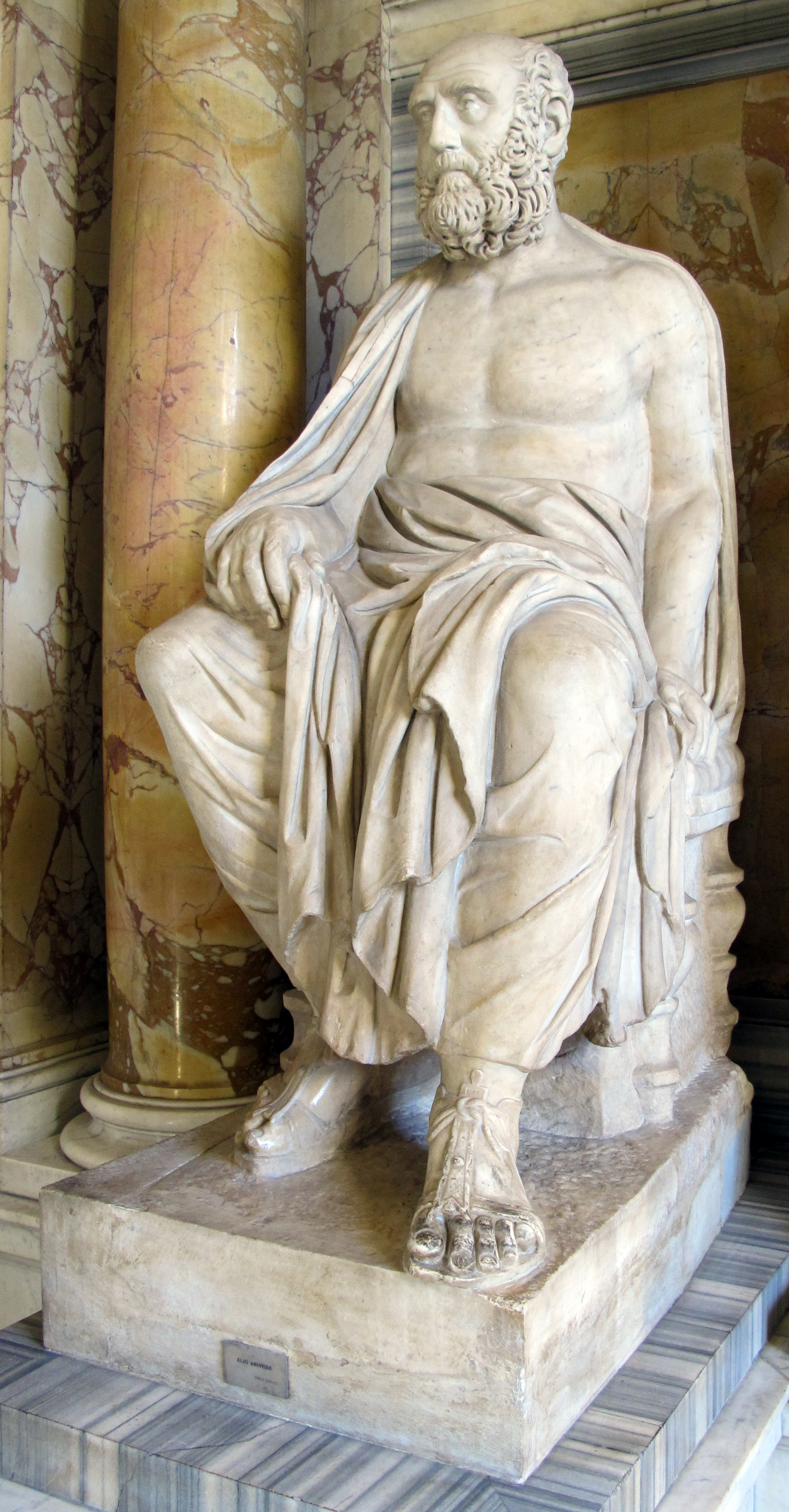
- Statue of Aelius Aristides in The Vatican
- Born: 117 AD; Hadriani, Mysia (modern-day Orhaneli, Bursa, Turkey)
- Died: 181 (aged 63–64)
- Writing career
- Language: Ancient Greek
- Genre: Oratory
- Subject: Dream interpretation
- Notable work: Sacred Tales

Publius Aelius Aristides Theodorus (Ancient Greek: Πόπλιος Αἴλιος Ἀριστείδης Θεόδωρος; 117–181 AD) was a Greek orator and author considered to be a prime example as a member of the Second Sophistic, a group of celebrated and highly influential orators who flourished from the reign of Nero until c. 230 AD.

More than fifty of his orations and other works survive, dating from the reigns of Antoninus Pius and Marcus Aurelius. His early success was interrupted by a decades-long series of illnesses for which he sought relief by divine communion with the god Asclepius, effected by interpreting and obeying the dreams that came to him while sleeping in the god's sacred precinct; he later recorded this experience in a series of discourses titled Sacred Tales (Hieroi Logoi). In his later life, Aristides resumed his career as an orator, achieving such notable success that Philostratus would declare that "Aristides was of all the sophists most deeply versed in his art."

== Life ==
Aristides was probably born at Hadriani in rural area of Mysia. His father, a wealthy landowner, arranged for Aristides to have the finest education available. Aristides first studied under Alexander of Cotyaeum (later a tutor of Marcus Aurelius) at Smyrna, then traveled to various cities to learn from the foremost sophists of the day, including studies in Athens and Alexandria.

The capstone of his education was a trip to Egypt in 141 AD. Along the way he began his career as an orator, declaiming at Cos, Cnidos, Rhodes, and Alexandria. His travels in Egypt included a journey upriver in hopes of finding the source of the Nile, as he later recounted in "The Egyptian Discourse". Becoming ill, he returned home to Smyrna, and sought to cure himself by turning to the Egyptian god Serapis (as recounted in his earliest preserved speech, "Regarding Serapis").

Hoping to advance his career as an orator, late in 143 AD Aristides traveled to Rome, but his ambitions were thwarted by severe illness. He returned home to Smyrna. Seeking relief, he eventually turned to Asclepius, "the paramount healing god of the ancient world", and traveled to the god's temple in Pergamum, "one of the chief healing sites in the ancient world", where "incubants" slept on the temple grounds, then recorded their dreams in search of prescriptions from the god; for Aristides, these included fasting, unusual diets, bloodletting, enemas, vomiting, and either refraining from bathing or bathing in frigid rivers.

Despite recurrent bouts of illness, by 147 AD Aristides resumed his career as a writer and occasional lecturer, though he sought legal immunity from various civic and religious obligations expected of a citizen of his standing. By 154 AD he felt well enough to resume his career on a full scale, including lecture tours to Greece and to Rome, where, in the presence of the imperial court, he delivered what was to become his most famous speech, "Regarding Rome". He also took pupils, the most famous being the sophist Damianus.

In 165 AD, Aristides contracted the so-called Antonine Plague (probably smallpox) that ravaged the Roman Empire. He survived, but became less active and renewed his devotion to Asclepius. In 171 AD he set about writing the Sacred Tales to record the numerous omens and insights he had received from Asclepius in his dreams over a period of almost thirty years.

His greatest career success came in 176 AD, when Marcus Aurelius visited Smyrna and Aristides delivered an oration that greatly impressed the emperor. His greatest civic success followed in 177 AD when an earthquake destroyed Smyrna; Aristides wrote an appeal to Marcus Aurelius that was so instrumental in securing imperial funds for rebuilding that Philostratus would write, "To say that Aristides founded Smyrna is no mere boastful eulogy but most just and true." A bronze statue of Aristides was set up in the marketplace of Smyrna, inscribed, "For his goodness and speeches".

Aristides spent his last years in seclusion at his country estates in Mysia, dying in 181 AD. Living a generation after Aristides, the most famous physician of antiquity, Galen, wrote: "As to them whose souls are naturally strong and whose bodies are weak, I have seen only a few of them. One of them was Aristides... [who] belonged to the most prominent rank of orators. Thus it happened to him, since he was active in teaching and speaking throughout his life, that his whole body wasted away."

== Works ==
Aristides' "many-sided literary output...made him a giant in his own day", and the subsequent popularity of his work—addresses for public and private occasions, polemical essays, declamations on historical themes, and prose hymns to various gods—established him (according to Glen Bowersock) as a "pivotal figure in the transmission of Hellenism".

=== Orations ===
Unlike many sophists, Aristides disliked speaking extempore. According to Philostratus, "Since his natural talent was not in the line of extempore eloquence, he strove after extreme accuracy...he was well endowed with native ability and purified his style of any empty verbosity." When he met Marcus Aurelius in Smyrna and the emperor asked him to declaim, Aristides replied: "Propose the theme today and tomorrow come and hear me, for I am one of those who do not vomit their speeches but try to make them perfect."

Aristides' most famous oration was the Roman Oration, which he delivered before the imperial household in Rome and in which Aristides glorifies "the Empire and the theory behind it, particularly the Pax Romana", and "paints an impressive picture of the Roman achievement". "The culminating passage...compares the creation of the Roman World with the creation of an orderly universe and represents the Roman World as the perfect state in which the gods can take delight, because it is dedicated to them." This oration would become "the main basis for history's favorable verdict on the Antonines", inspiring Gibbon's famous pronouncement that the period between Domitian and Commodus was the happiest era of human history.

There are five extant works by Aristides regarding the city of Smyrna. The first Smyrnaean Oration, a sort of guided tour of the city for a visiting official, gives "the best description of ancient Smyrna which we possess". Other works describe the city before and after the devastating earthquake of 177 CE, including A Letter to the Emperors Concerning Smyrna. According to Philostratus, Marcus Aurelius was so moved when this speech was read to him that he "actually shed tears over the pages." In To Plato: In Defense of the Four, Aristides derisively criticizes a group of people by comparing them to "impious men of Palestine" that "do not believe in the higher powers":

These men alone should be classed neither among flatterers nor free men. For they deceive like flatterers, but they are insolent as if they were of higher rank, since they are involved in the two most extreme and opposite evils, baseness and willfulness, behaving like those impious men of Palestine. For the proof of the impiety of those people is that they do not believe in the higher powers. And these men in a certain fashion have defected from the Greek race, or rather from all that is higher.

=== Sacred Tales ===
According to the Oxford Classical Dictionary, the six books of Sacred Tales "are in a class apart. A record of revelations made to Aristides in dreams by the healing god Asclepius ... they are of major importance, both as evidence for the practices associated with temple medicine, and as the fullest first-hand report of personal religious experience that survives from any pagan writer." Modern scholarship has seen a proliferation of theories about the nature of Aristides' illnesses (real or imagined) and about the meaning of his religious experiences; "a number of scholars have applied psychoanalytical theories to Aristides' self-presentation" and have come to various conclusions.

The complete works of Aristides were translated into English by Charles A. Behr and published in two volumes, in 1981 and 1986. Behr also worked out a chronology of Aristides' life and works and composed a lengthy biography which was included in his earlier book Aelius Aristides and the Sacred Tales (1968), in which he set forth the unique importance of the Sacred Tales:

Nowhere does the whole person of a figure from the ancient world lie more open to scrutiny than that of Aristides through the prism of the Sacred Tales. If the voluminous and faithful record of dream world and waking life, which is the substance of that work, is correctly employed, for the first time unequaled possibilities are at hand to break the barriers of anonymity which surround the inner life of even the best known figures of antiquity, and without qualification or conjecture, to penetrate to the subconscious level of one of them.

== Text transmission and editions ==
=== Manuscripts ===
234 manuscripts of works by Aelius Aristides are catalogued by Charles A. Behr. The earliest of them are four papyrus fragments dating from the fifth to the seventh centuries AD. Two are from Panathenaicus (Or. 1), and the others are from In Defense of the Four (Or. 3) and the Sacred Tales.

The earliest surviving medieval manuscript is codex A (written ca.917 by the scribe John the Calligrapher for the archbishop Arethas of Caesarea), now divided in two: Parisinus graecus 2951 and Laurentianus 60.3. It contains 42 of 53 surviving speeches and is the only one to preserve the fragmentary Or. 53. The earliest nearly complete text (missing only the fragmentary Orr. 52–53) is T (Laurentianus graecus 60.8; eleventh century).

According to Behr, the whole tradition has one common reconstructable archetype (O) and was divided into two routes via the hyparchetypes ω and φ, both lost. The papyrus fragments represent perhaps a different line of transmission, but they are too short and hence of no great use.

=== Editions ===
The first speeches by Aelius Aristides to be printed were Panathenaicus and The Encomium on Rome (Orr. 1 and 36) added as appendix to Aldus Manutius's 1513 edition of Isocrates. The first full edition was the Juntine, edited by Eufrosino Bonino and published by Filippo Giunta (Florence, 1517), though it omits Orr. 16 and 53. It was based on two inferior manuscripts and followed the faulty ordering of the speeches.

The Latin translation of Aristides was made by Willem Canter (Basel, 1566), who also reordered the speeches. It is this order that remained in all subsequent editions up to and including Dindorf's. These editions combined the Juntine text with Canter's translation. Paul Estienne's (Geneva, 1604) and Samuel Jebb's (Oxford, 1722–1730) are the best ones. Johann Jakob Reiske planned an edition, but never completed the task. In 1761 he published a very acute set of notes and comments on Aristides and made a compilation of scholia.

The most important 19th-century edition was Karl Wilhelm Dindorf's 1829. Its first two volumes contain Aristides's text, while the third presents the scholia collected by Reiske. Bruno Keil intended to publish a completely new complete edition, but finished only the second volume (1898; speeches 17–53). He also restored the order of the speeches as it is found in the manuscript T. His work was taken by Friedrich Walter Lenz, who prepared speeches 1 and 5–16, but died in 1969. At last Charles Allison Behr completed this task and published the first volume (1976, 1980; speeches 1–16).

A complete edition in 4 volumes with Behr's English translation was announced by the Loeb Classical Library, but only the first volume was published (1973). Instead, Behr's complete English translation of all speeches in 2 volumes was published by Brill (1981, 1986). A new Loeb edition is being prepared by Michael Trapp (with Greek text after Lenz-Behr and Keil), of which two volumes are available: vol.1 (Orations 1-2, 2017, LCL 533) and vol. 2 (Orations 3-4, 2021, LCL 545).
