= Hadriani ad Olympum =

Town of ancient Bithynia

Coordinates: 39°54′24″N 28°59′19″E

Hadriani ad Olympum, or simply Hadriani or Hadrianoi (Ancient Greek: Ἀδριανοί), was a town of ancient Bithynia, not far from the western bank of the river Rhyndacus. Its site is near Orhaneli in Asiatic Turkey.

It was built, as its name indicates, by the emperor Hadrian and situated on a spur of Mount Olympus, modern Mount Uludağ. Hadriani was the birthplace of the rhetorician Aelius Aristides, born in 117.

In the ecclesiastical writers the town is known as the see of a bishop in the Hellespontine province. No longer a residential see, it remains a titular see of the Roman Catholic Church.

Recent excavations are revealing parts of the ancient city.
