= Bruno Keil =

German classical philologist (1859–1916)

- Born: 8 July 1859; Havelberg, Kreis Westpriegnitz, Regierungsbezirk Potsdam, Province of Brandenburg, Kingdom of Prussia, German Confederation
- Died: 23 March 1916 (aged 56); Leipzig, Kingdom of Saxony, German Empire
- Education: University of Greifswald
- Occupation: Classical philologist
- Scientific career
- Fields: Philology

Bruno Keil (8 July 1859 in Havelberg – 23 March 1916 in Leipzig) was a German classical philologist.

== Life ==
He studied classical philology, archaeology and Germanistics in Berlin, Bonn and Greifswald, obtaining his doctorate in 1884 at the University of Greifswald with a highly regarded thesis on Isocrates. As a student, his influences were Ulrich von Wilamowitz-Moellendorff, Georg Kaibel and Rudolf Hercher.

He took scientific travels to Italy, Spain and France, and beginning in 1888, worked at the Sophiengymnasium in Berlin. In 1890, he became an associate professor at the University of Strasbourg, where he gained a full professorship in 1901. From the autumn of 1913 until his death, he taught classes at the University of Leipzig.

In addition to Isocrates, his academic research included studies of the ancient rhetoricians Aeschines and Demosthenes, the Second Sophistic orator Aelius Aristides and the satirist Lucian. He made contributions in the fields of Greek epigrammatic poetry, Greek metrology and numismatics, and in his later years, he focused his energies towards ancient Greek epigraphy.

== Death ==
Professor Dr. phil. Bruno Keil died on 23 March 1916 at the age of 56. He was buried on 31 March 1916, in the cathedral cemetery in Havelberg. The eulogy was delivered by his friend, Superintendent Ernst Hörnlein, father of the later General Walter Hörnlein.

To everyone's surprise, three distinguished gentlemen then approached the grave one after the other and bid farewell to the deceased in moving words. Their heartfelt words focused first on his exceptionally successful career, but also expressed their personal esteem for the departed. It later transpired that the three gentlemen were university professors from Leipzig, Göttingen, and Strasbourg in the Imperial Territory of Alsace-Lorraine. Each had shared a significant portion of their professional career with Bruno Keil. The eulogies of the three professors were published in a small booklet in Leipzig under the title "Words of Farewell."

== Selected works ==
- "Analectorum Isocrateorum Specimen", 1884.
- "Analecta Isocratea", 1885.
- Die solonische Verfassung in Aristoteles Verfassungsgeschichte Athens, 1892 – The Solonian Constitution in Aristotle's constitutional history of Athens.
- "Aelii Aristidis Smyrnaei quae supersunt omnia", 1898 – edition of Aelius Aristides.
- Beiträge zur Geschichte des Areopags, 1910 – Contributions to the history of the Areopagus.
- Über Lukians Phalarideen, 1913 – On Lucian's Phalaris.
- Anonymus argentinensis; fragmente zur geschichte des Perikleischen Athen aus einem Strassburger papyrus, 1920 – Anonymous argentinensis, fragments on the history of Periclean Athens from a Strasbourg papyrus.
