= List of temples dedicated to Hadrian =

This is a list of Roman temples dedicated to the deified emperor Hadrian. Such a temple was called a Hadrianeum.

- Caesarea Maritima

A temple was constructed in Caesarea in connection with a visit by Hadrian. It may have continued to function as a pagan temple into the 6th century.

- Cyzicus

The temple was begun after an earthquake in 123, when Hadrian arrived to oversee rebuilding. It was finished in 139. The foundations and column drums still survive, showing it to have been the largest Greco-Roman temple ever built. According to John Malalas, there was a marble bust of Hadrian in the pediment. Drawings of this bust and some of the other sculptures were made by Cyriacus of Ancona in the mid-fifteenth century. It is also depicted on contemporary Cyzicene coins.

- Ephesus

The temple was built after Hadrian's death by Publius Vedius Antoninus. It contained a triumphal gate in imitation of the Arch of Hadrian in Athens.

- Rome

The great Temple of Hadrian in Rome was built by his successor, Antoninus Pius, in 145.

- Seleucia

A temple here has been dated to the reign of Antoninus Pius. The remains of an emperor's statue have been tentatively identified as Hadrian.

- Tiberias

Construction of a temple in Tiberias was begun but perhaps not completed. It was until recently known only from the late 4th-century testimony of Epiphanius of Salamis, who received it from Joseph of Tiberias, who claimed to have built a church on the never completed Hadrianeum, which itself had been converted into a public bath. The remains of this temple were discovered in 2004. It was probably constructed in 119/120 in connection with a local issue of coinage by Hadrian.
