= Damian of Ephesus =

2nd century Greek sophist

Damian of Ephesus (Ancient Greek: Δαμιανός ὁ Εφέσιος, fl. 2nd century AD) was a member of the Second Sophistic who lived in Ephesus. He is best known as a source for Philostratus, the author of Lives of the Sophists, for his biographies of Aelius Aristides and Adrianus, as well as being a philanthropolist in his home town.

He was born to a wealthy and distinguished family, and was a student of Aristides and Adrianus. As a sophist, Damian not only taught in Ephesus, but he provided funds to support the city's poor and contributed funds to restore public buildings. Notable buildings include an elaborate marble portico to connect the city to the Temple of Artemis, and a large dining hall in the sanctuary of the Temple.

Damian married the daughter of Publius Vedius Antoninus, a leading decurion of Ephesus; their descendants became members of the Roman Senate, including three consuls and two wives of consuls.
