= Alexander of Cotiaeum =

2nd-century Greek grammarian

Alexander of Cotyaeum (Ancient Greek: Ἀλέξανδρος; c. 70–80 AD – c. 150) was a Greek grammarian, who is mentioned among the instructors of the Roman emperor Marcus Aurelius. We still possess an epitaph (λόγος ἐπιτάφιος) pronounced upon him by the rhetorician Aelius Aristides, who had studied under Alexander.
