= Apollonius of Chalcedon =

Tutor to sons of Roman emperor Antoninus Pius

Apollonius (Ancient Greek: Άπολλώνιος) of Chalcedon was an ancient Greek Stoic who taught philosophy. He was invited by the Roman emperor Antoninus Pius to come to Rome, for the purpose of instructing his adoptive sons Marcus Aurelius and Lucius Verus in philosophy. Aurelius, within his Meditations, writes of Apollonius favourably. Lucian writes of him:

When Apollonius was appointed professor of philosophy in the Imperial household, Demonax witnessed his departure, attended by a great number of his pupils. 'Why, here is Apollonius with all his Argonauts,' he cried.

Apollonius was also possibly from Chalcis instead of Chalcedon, or, according to Cassius Dio, from Nicomedia.
