= Gandhara =

Ancient Indo-Aryan region and civilisation in South Asia

Coordinates: 33.7560°N 72.8291°E

Gandhāra
- Location of Gandhāra in South Asia (Afghanistan and Pakistan)
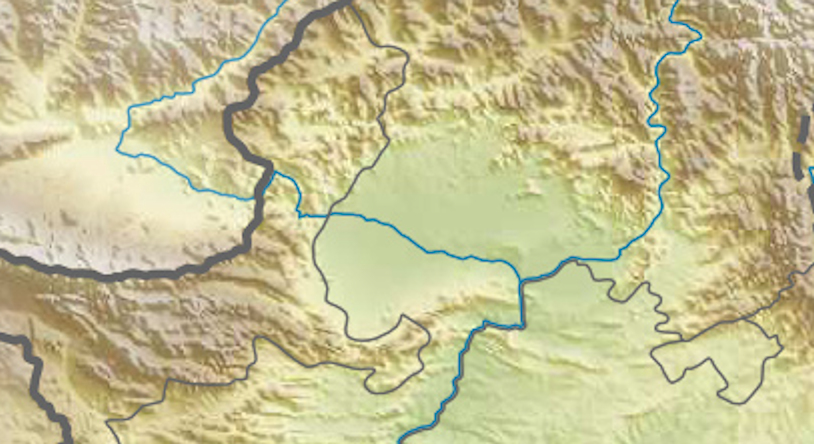
- Approximate geographical region of Gandhara centered on the Peshawar Basin, in present-day northwest Pakistan
- Capital: Pushkalavati; Purushapura; Kapisa; Taxila; Hund
- Government
- Raja
  - c. 6th/5th century BCE: Pushkarasarin
  - c. 330 BCE: Taxiles
  - c. 321 BCE: Chandragupta Maurya
  - c. 46 CE: Sases
  - c. 127 CE: Kanishka
  - c. 514 CE: Mihirakula
  - 964 – 1001: Jayapala
- Historical era: Antiquity
- Today part of: Pakistan; Afghanistan

Gandhara (IAST: Gandhāra) was an ancient Indo-Aryan culture and historical region located in present-day northwestern Pakistan and northeastern Afghanistan. Situated at the crossroads of Central and South Asia, it was known for being an influential Buddhist civilisation and its absorption of diverse influences from neighbouring areas. The core of the region of Gandhara was the Valley of Peshawar, though the cultural influence of "Greater Gandhara" extended across the Indus River to Taxila and westwards into the Kabul Valley as far as Bamyan, and northwards up to the Karakoram range, including Swat, Panjkora and other valleys.

Gandhara is named after the Gandhāra tribe of the Vedic period, who are attested in the Rigveda (c. 1500–c. 1200 BCE). Indo-Aryans migrated into the region sometimes between 1900 and 1500 BCE, and mixed with the local population. (Note: : "...we estimate the date of admixture into the Late Bronze Age and Iron Age individuals from the Swat District of northernmost South Asia to be, on average, 26 generations before the date that they lived, corresponding to a 95% confidence interval of ~1900 to 1500 BCE...") The Gandhara grave culture (c. 1400–800 BCE) has sometimes been taken as a representative of Indo-Aryan migrations, although it has also been regarded as a local development or a combination of the two.

Gandhara was one of the sixteen mahajanapadas ("great realms") during the 6th and 5th centuries BCE. It was annexed by the Achaemenid Empire in the late 6th century BCE as the satrapy of Gandāra. During its invasion by Alexander the Great in 327–326 BCE, Gandhara was divided among various polities, notably that of Taxila under king Omphis and the tribe of Aśvaka.

Gandhara became a part of the Maurya Empire in 321 BCE. In the succeeding centuries it was ruled by the Indo-Greeks, the Indo-Scythians, and the Indo-Parthians; local Gandharan dynasties of Oḍirājas and Apracharajas remained autonomous in some parts until the ascent of the Kushan Empire, which saw the zenith of region's cultural and political influence. Gandhara was devastated during the Hunnic invasions, but survived as a core region under Turk Shahis and Hindu Shahis. After the Ghaznavid conquest in 11th century, Gandhara as a geographical term largely faded away, although the name continued to be used for the region in the Kashmiri Sanskrit historiography until 15th century.

Gandhara was a major centre for Greco-Buddhism (4th century BCE–5th century CE) under the Indo-Greeks and Gandharan Buddhism under later dynasties; it was also the central location for the Silk Road transmission of Buddhism to Central and East Asia. Hinduism experienced a significant revival between the seventh and eleventh centuries under the Shahis. It was famed for its unique Gandharan style of art influenced by the classical Hellenistic styles. Gandhārī, an Indo-Aryan language written in the Kharosthi script, acted as a lingua franca of the region.

== Etymology ==
Gandhara was known in Sanskrit as Gandhāraḥ (गन्धारः) and in Avestan as 'Vaēkərəta. In Old Persian, Gandhara was known as Gadāra (𐎥𐎭𐎠𐎼, also transliterated as Ga^{n}dāra since the nasal "n" before consonants were omitted in Old Persian). In Chinese, Gandhara is known as Jiāntuóluó (traditional Chinese: 犍陀羅; simplified Chinese: 犍陀罗, also written 健馱邏; 健驮逻), with the Middle Chinese pronunciation reconstructed as kɨɐndala. One state of the region named Jìbīn (罽賓; 罽宾, also romanised as Kipin) is recorded in the Book of Han.

One proposed origin of the name is from the Sanskrit word gandhaḥ (गन्धः), meaning "perfume" and "referring to the spices and aromatic herbs which they (the inhabitants) traded and with which they anointed themselves". The Gandhari people are a tribe mentioned in the Rigveda, the Atharvaveda, and later Vedic texts. A Persian form of the name, Gandāra, mentioned in the Behistun inscription of Emperor Darius I, was translated as Paruparaesanna (Para-upari-sena, meaning "beyond the Hindu Kush") in Babylonian and Elamite in the same inscription. In Greek, Gandhara was known as Paropamisadae.

== Geography ==
The geographical extent of Gandhara underwent much alteration throughout history, with the core being the region bounded by the Indus River, the Swat Valley, and the Kabul River. Its prominent urban centres were Taxila and Puṣkalāvatī. The cultural influence of Gandhara stretched as far as Jhelum River in the east as evident by the discovery of Gandhara style Buddhist artworks there. One Jataka tale includes Kashmir Valley within Gandhara. The kingdom of Taxila stretched from the Indus to the Hydaspes (Jhelum) during the rule of Taxiles in 326 BCE.

Richard Salomon uses the term "Greater Gandhara" to describe the extent of the cultural influence of Gandhara and its language, Gandhari. In the later historical sources, Greater Gandhara encompassed the territories of Jibin and Oddiyana, extending into parts of Bactria and the Tarim Basin. Oddiyana was situated in the vicinity of the Swat Valley, while Jibin corresponded to the region of Kapisa, south of the Hindu Kush. The Udichya region was noted by ancient grammarian Pāṇini as comprising both the regions of Vahika and Gandhara.

== History ==
=== Vedic period (c. 1500-500 BCE) ===
==== Gandhāra grave culture (c. 1400-800 BCE) ====
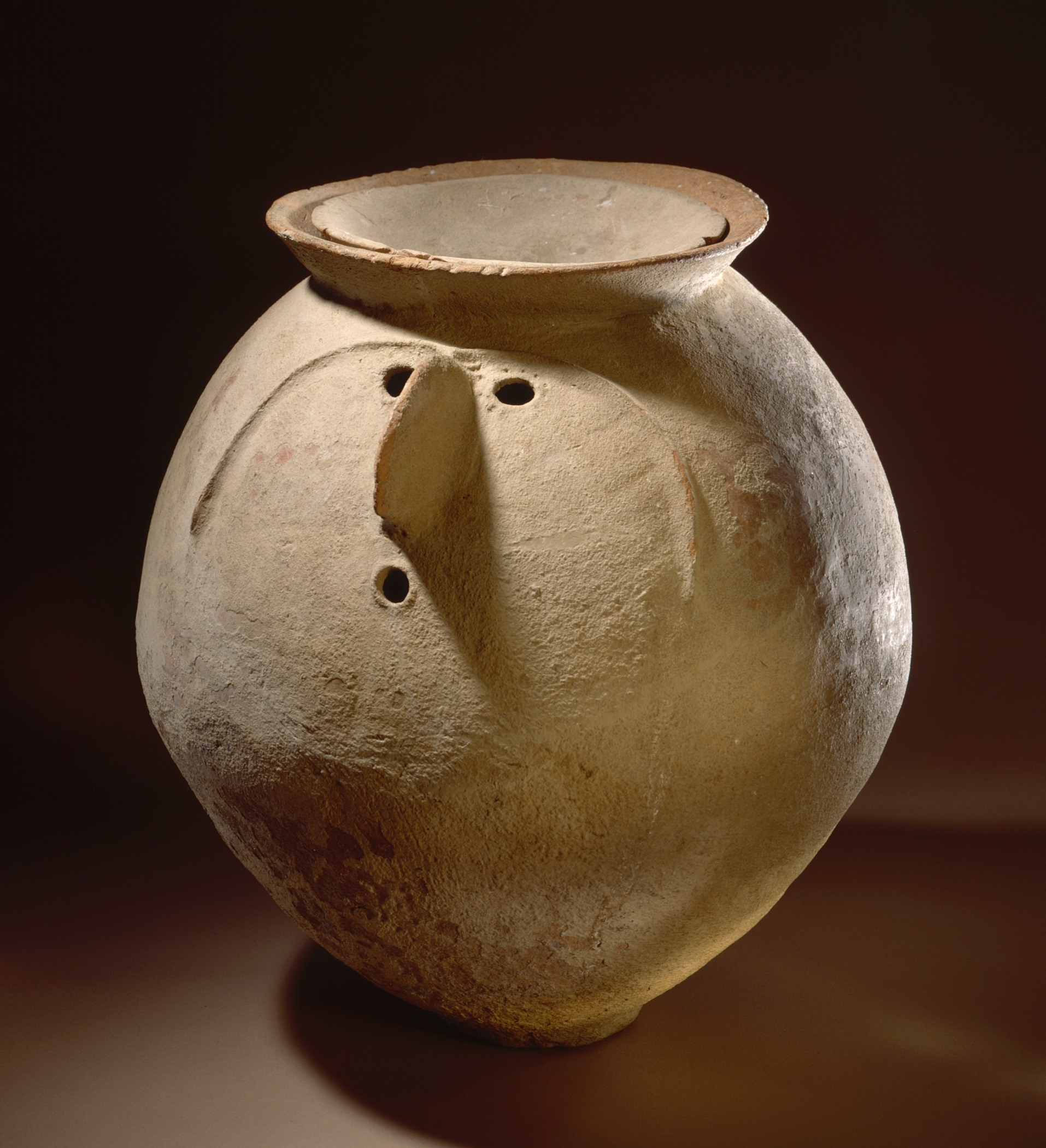
Cremation urn, Gandhara grave culture, Swat Valley, c. 1200 BCE

The Gandhara Grave Culture emerged c. 1400 BCE and lasted until 800 BCE, and was named for their distinct funerary practices. It was found along the Middle Swat River course, even though earlier research considered it to be expanded to the Valleys of Dir, Kunar, Chitral, and Peshawar. It has been regarded as a token of the Indo-Aryan migrations but has also been explained by local cultural continuity. DNA analyses shows that inhabitants of the Swat area mixed with Indo-Aryans coming from the Inner Asia Mountain Corridor, who carried Steppe ancestry, sometime between 1900 and 1500 BCE.

==== Early Vedic period (c. 1500-1100 BCE) ====
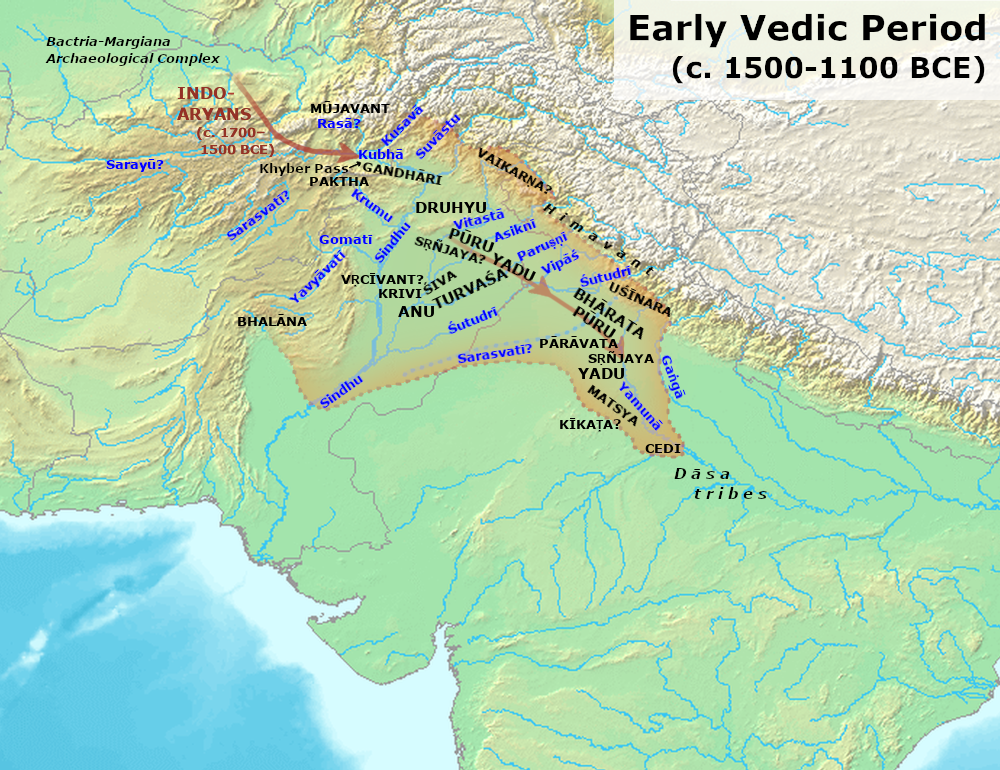
Location of the Gāndhārīs the Vedic tribes.

The first mention of the Gandhārīs is in the Ṛigveda, as a tribe that has sheep with good wool. In the Atharvaveda, the Gandhārīs are mentioned alongside the Mūjavants, the Āṅgeyas and the Māgadhīs in a hymn asking fever to leave the body of the sick man and instead go those aforementioned tribes. The tribes listed were the furthermost border tribes known to those in Madhyadeśa, the Āṅgeyas and Māgadhīs in the east, and the Mūjavants and Gandhārīs in the north.

The Gandhara tribe, after which it is named, is attested in the Rigveda (c. 1500 – c. 1200 BCE), while the region is mentioned in the Zoroastrian Avesta as Vaēkərəta, the seventh most beautiful place on earth created by Ahura Mazda.

According to Rigvedic tradition, Yayati was the progenitor of the prominent Udichya (Gandhara and Vahika tribes) and had numerous sons, including Anu, Puru, and Druhyu. The lineage of Anu gave rise to the Madra, Kekaya, Sivi and Uśīnara kingdoms, while the Druhyu tribe has been associated with the Gandhara kingdom.

==== Late Vedic period (c. 1100-500 BCE) ====
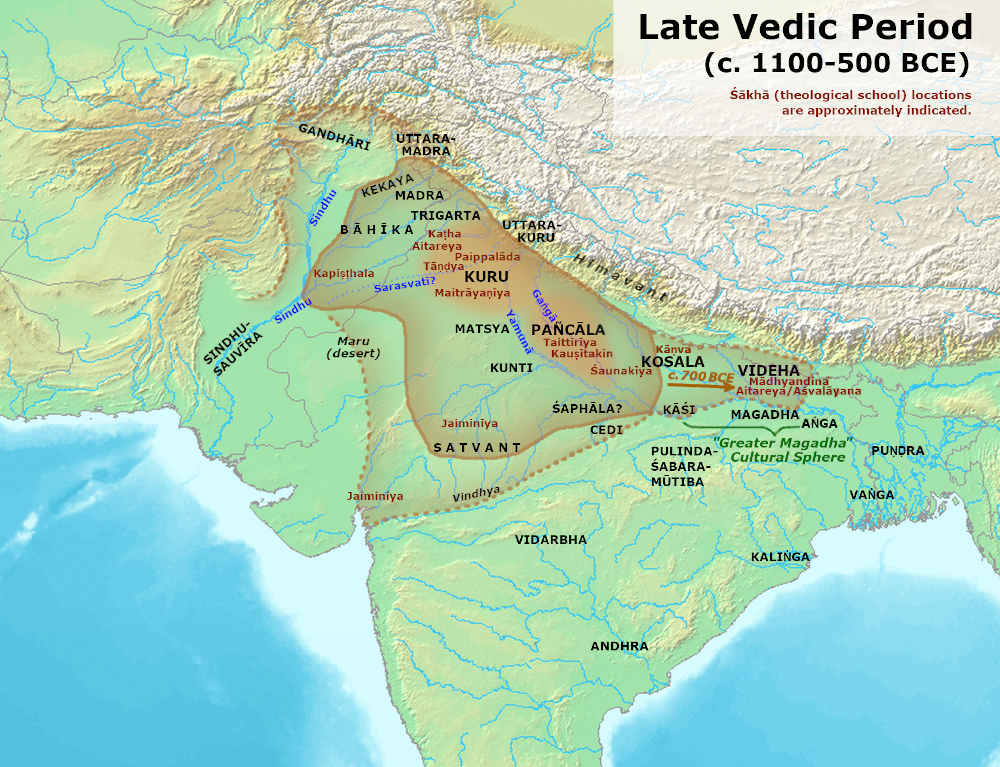
Location of Gandhāra during the late Vedic period.

The Gāndhārī king Nagnajit and his son Svarajit are mentioned in the Brāhmaṇas (900-700 BCE), according to which they received Brahmanic consecration, but their family's attitude towards ritual is mentioned negatively, with the royal family of Gandhāra during this period following non-Brahmanical religious traditions. According to the Jain Uttarādhyayana-sūtra, Nagnajit, or Naggaji, was a prominent king who had adopted Jainism and was comparable to Dvimukha of Pāñcāla, Nimi of Videha, Karakaṇḍu of Kaliṅga, and Bhīma of Vidarbha; Buddhist sources instead claim that he had achieved paccekabuddhayāna.

By the later Vedic period the Gāndhārī capital of Takṣaśila had become an important centre of knowledge where the men of Madhya-desa went to learn the three Vedas and the eighteen branches of knowledge, with the Kauśītaki Brāhmaṇa recording that brāhmaṇas went north to study. According to the Śatapatha Brāhmaṇa and the Uddālaka Jātaka, the famous Vedic philosopher Uddālaka Āruṇi was among the famous students of Takṣaśila, and the Setaketu Jātaka claims that his son Śvetaketu also studied there. In the Chāndogya Upaniṣad, Uddālaka Āruṇi himself favourably referred to Gāndhārī education to the Vaideha king Janaka.

=== Mahajanapadas (c. 6th century BCE) ===
During the 6th century BCE, Gandhāra was an important imperial power in north-west Iron Age South Asia, with the valley of Kaśmīra being part of the kingdom. Due to this important position, Buddhist texts listed the Gandhāra kingdom as one of the sixteen Mahājanapadas ("great realms") of Iron Age South Asia. It was the home of Gandhari, the princess and her brother Shakuni the king of Gandhara Kingdom.

=== Achaemenid (Persian) rule (6th-4th cent. BCE BCE) ===
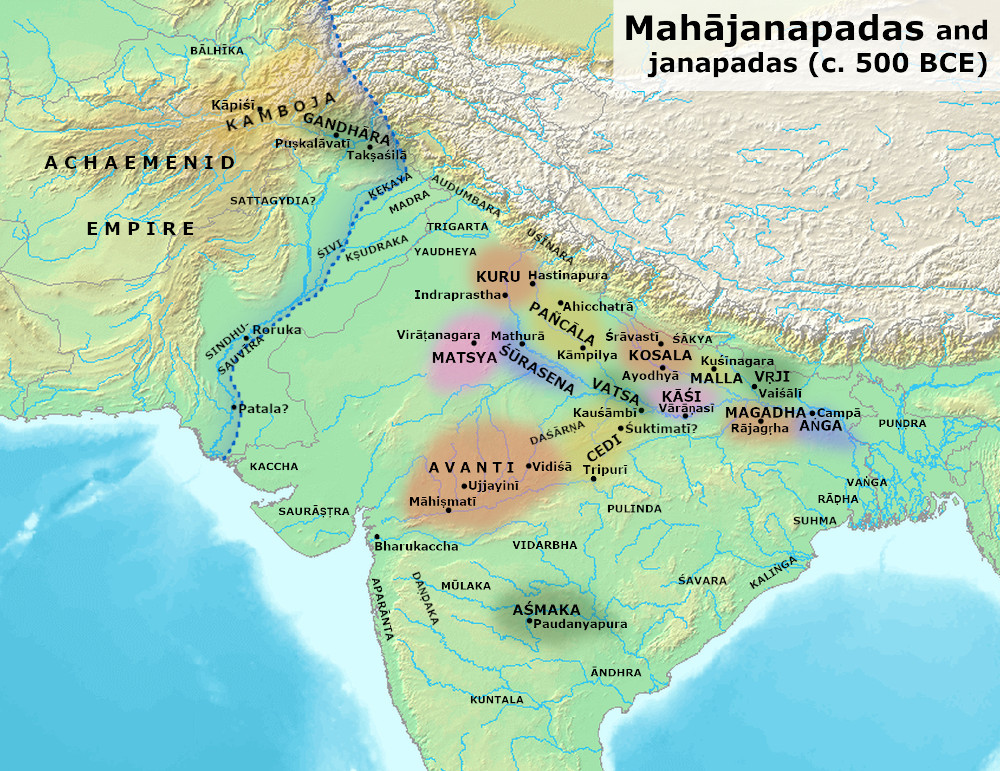
Map of ancient India, c. 500 BCE, with the Persian frontier delineated along the Indus River and the Jhelum River

==== Achaemenid conquest by Cyrus the Great (535-518 BCE) ====
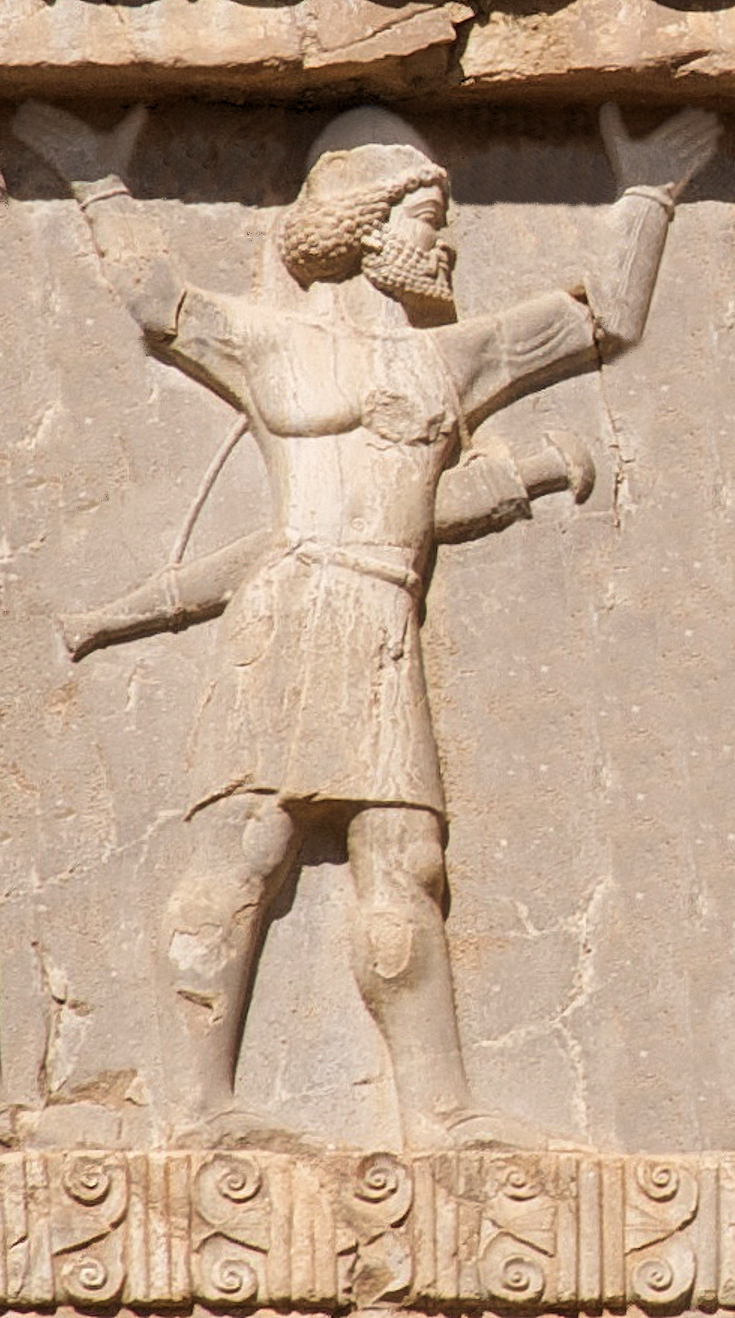
Gandāra soldier from the tomb of Xerxes I, c. 470 BCE

Around 535 BCE, the Persian king Cyrus the Great initiated a protracted campaign to absorb parts of northwestern Indian subcontinent into his nascent Achaemenid Empire. In this initial incursion, the Persian army annexed a large region to the west of the Indus River, consolidating the early eastern borders of their new realm. With a brief pause after Cyrus' death around 530 BCE, the campaign continued under Darius the Great, who began to re-conquer former provinces and further expand the Achaemenid Empire's political boundaries. Around 518 BCE, the Persian army pushed further into India to initiate a second period of conquest by annexing regions up to the Jhelum River in what is today known as Punjab. At peak, the Persians managed to take control of most of modern-day Pakistan and incorporate it into their territory.

Megasthenes' Indica states that the Achaemenids never conquered India, and had only approached its borders after battling with the Massagetae. It further states that the Persians summoned mercenaries specifically from the Oxydrakai tribe, who were previously known to have resisted the incursions of Alexander the Great, but they never entered their armies into the region of Gandhara.

==== Centralised administration and Kharosthi script ====
Under Persian rule, a system of centralised administration, with a bureaucratic system, was introduced into the Indus Valley for the first time. Provinces or "satrapies" were established with provincial capitals. The Gandhara satrapy, established 518 BCE with its capital at Pushkalavati (Charsadda).

It was also during the Achaemenid Empire rule of Gandhara that the Kharosthi script, the script of Gandhari prakrit, was born through the Aramaic alphabet.

==== Gandharan troops employed by Xerxes the Great (c. 518 BC – 465 BC) ====
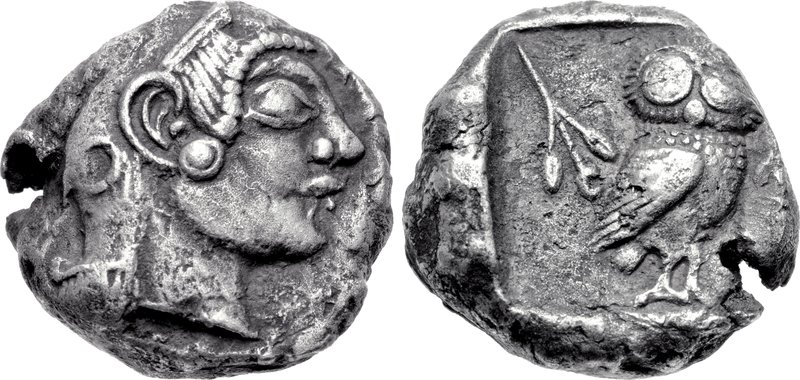
Athenian tetradrachm (c. 500/490–485 BCE) discovered in Pushkalavati. This coin is the earliest known example of its type to be found so far east. Such coins were circulating in the area as currency, at least as far as the Indus, during the reign of the Achaemenids.

During the reign of Xerxes I, Gandharan troops were noted by Herodotus to have taken part in the Second Persian invasion of Greece and were described as clothed similar to that of the Bactrians. Herodotus states that during the battle they were led by the Achamenid general Artyphius.

=== Conquest by Alexander the Great (327 BCE) ===
In 327 BCE, Alexander the Great's military campaign progressed to Arigaum, on the western fringe of Gandhara and situated in present-day Nawagai, marking the initial encounter with the Gandharian Aspasians. Arrian (c. 86/89 – c. after 146/160 CE), in his Anabasis of Alexander, recalls their implementation of a scorched earth strategy, evidenced by the city ablaze upon Alexander's arrival, with its inhabitants already fleeing. (Note: Dani & Bernard (1994, p. 73): "Then crossing the mountains Alexander descended to a city called Arigaeum [identified with Nawagai], and found that this had been set on fire by the inhabitants, who had afterwards fled.") The Aspasians fiercely contested Alexander's forces, resulting in their eventual defeat.

According to Arrian's Indica, the region west of the Indus River was inhabited by two tribes, the Assakenoi (Asvakas) and Astakanoi, whom he describes as 'Indian' and occupying the two great cities of Massaga, located in the Swat valley, and Pushkalavati, in modern-day Peshawar.

Alexander traversed the River Guraeus in the contemporary Dir District, engaging with the Gandharian Asvakas, as chronicled in Sanskrit literature. (Note: Dani & Bernard (1994, p. 74): "Alexander then crossed the River Guraeus (the Panchkora, in Dir District). Beyond the Karmani pass lies the Talash valley. The Assacenians, identified with the Asvakas of Sanskrit literature, tried to defend themselves.") The primary stronghold among the Asvakas, Massaga, characterised as strongly fortified by Quintus Curtius Rufus, became a focal point. Despite an initial standoff which led to Alexander being struck in the leg by an Asvaka arrow, (Note: Dani & Bernard (1994): "Alexander while reconnoitring the fortifications, and unable to fix on a plan of attack, since nothing less than a vast mole, necessary for bringing up his engines to the walls, would suffice to fill up the chasms, was wounded from the ramparts by an arrow which chanced to hit him in the calf of the leg") peace terms were negotiated between the Queen of Massaga and Alexander. However, when the defenders had vacated the fort, a fierce battle ensued when Alexander broke the treaty. According to Diodorus Siculus (1st century BCE), the Asvakas, including women fighting alongside their husbands, valiantly resisted Alexander's army but were ultimately defeated. (Note: Dani & Bernard (1994, p. 75): "When many were thus wounded and not a few killed, the women, taking the arms of the fallen, fought side by side with the men for the imminence of the danger and the great interests at stake forced them to do violence to their nature, and to take an active part in the defence.")

East of Pushkalavati, the sovereign of Taxila, Omphis, formed an alliance with Alexander the Great, motivated by a longstanding animosity towards Porus, who ruled the Gandharian region encompassed by the Chenab and Jhelum River. (Note: Dani & Bernard (1994, p. 72): "The ruler of Taxila wanted to satisfy his own grudge against Porus") Omphis, in a gesture of goodwill, presented Alexander with significant gifts, esteemed among the Indian populace, and subsequently accompanied him on the expedition crossing the Indus. (Note: Dani & Bernard (1994, p. 72): "Taxiles and the others came to meet him, bringing gifts reckoned of value among the Indians. They presented him with the twenty-five elephants....and when they reached the Indus, they were to make all necessary preparations for the passage of the army. Taxiles and the other chiefs marched with them.")

=== Mauryan Gandhāra (3rd cent. BCE) ===
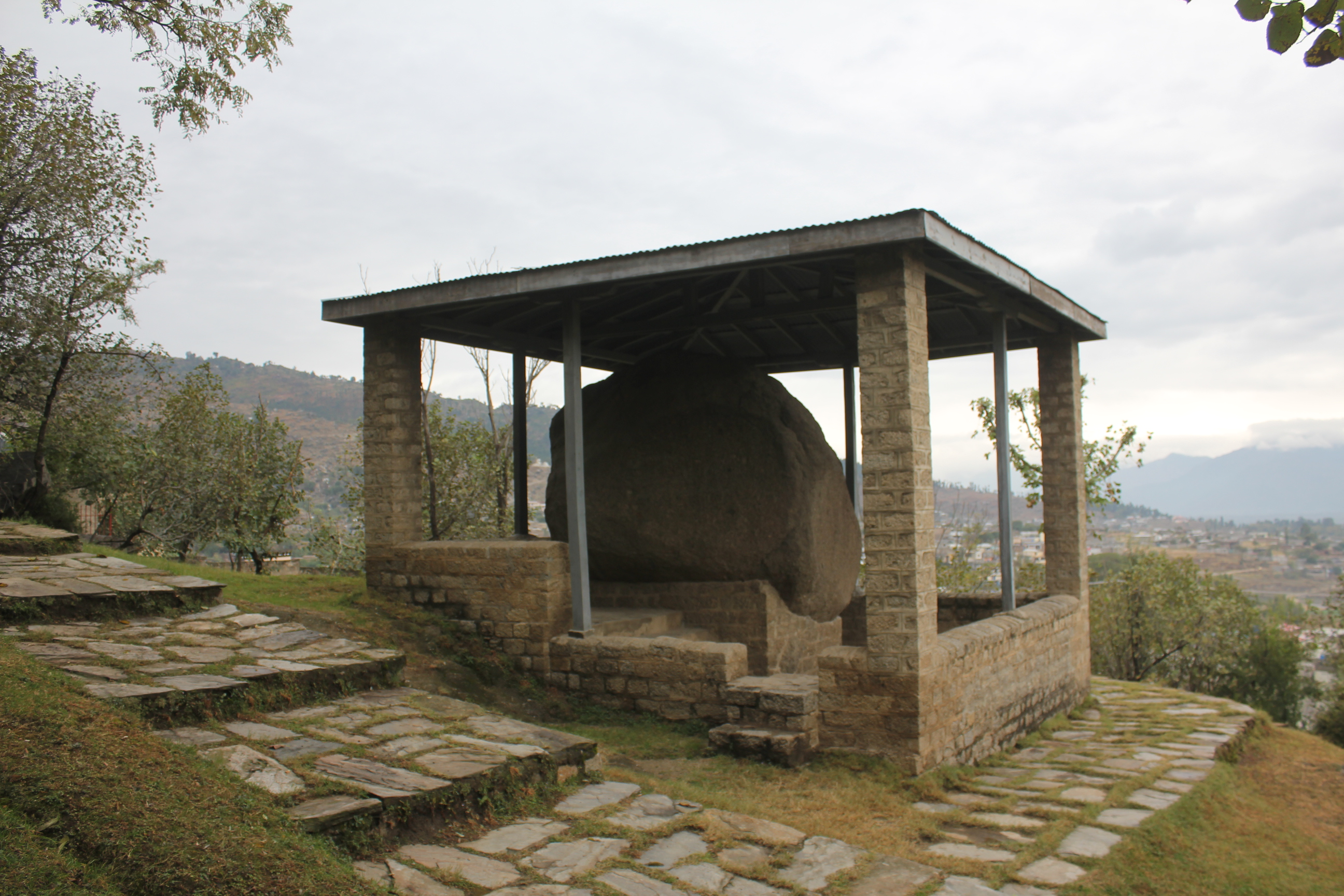
Major Rock Edict of Ashoka in Mansehra

During the Mauryan era, Gandhara held a pivotal position as a core territory within the empire, with Taxila serving as the provincial capital of the northwest.

After Alexander's death, Chandragupta Maurya allied with Trigarta king Parvataka to conquer the Nanda Empire. This alliance resulted in the formation of a composite army, comprising Gandharans and Kambojas, as documented in the Mudrarakshasa, and the establishment of the short-lived Mauryan Empire.

The reign of Chandragupta's successor Bindusara witnessed a rebellion among the locals of Taxila, to which Bindusara, according to the Ashokavadana, dispatched his son Ashoka to quell the uprising. Upon entering the city, the populace conveyed that their rebellion was not against Ashoka or Bindusara but rather against oppressive ministers. In Ashoka's subsequent tenure as emperor, he appointed his son as the new governor of Taxila. During this time, Ashoka erected numerous rock edicts in the region in the Kharosthi script and commissioned the construction of a monumental stupa in Pushkalavati, Western Gandhara, the location of which remains undiscovered to date.

According to Taranatha, following the death of Ashoka (died 232 BCE), the north-western half of India seceded from the Maurya Empire, and Virasena emerged as its king. Noteworthy for his diplomatic endeavours, Virasena's successor, Subhagasena (last decades of 3rd century BCE), maintained relations with the Seleucid Greeks. This engagement is corroborated by Polybius, who records an instance where Antiochus III the Great descended into India to renew his ties with King Subhagasena in 206 BCE, subsequently receiving a substantial gift of 150 elephants from the monarch.

=== Greek kingdoms (2nd cent. BCE - 1st cent. CE) ===
==== Greco-Bactrian rule (c. 180 BCE – c. 150 BCE) ====
The Greco-Bactrian Kingdom (256 BCE – c. 120 BCE) was a Greek kingdom during the Hellenistic period located in Central Asia and Afghanistan. The kingdom was founded by the Seleucid satrap Diodotus I Soter in about 256 BC, and continued to dominate Central Asia until its fall around 120 BC. (Note: Some cities were still controlled by Greek kings such as Hermaeus Soter (90–70 BC) in what is today Kabul.)

Demetrius I of Bactria of Bactria (reign c. 200 BCE-c. 180 BCE) started an invasion of the Indian subcontinent before 180 BCE. His conquests were mentioned by the historian Strabo along with that of Menander. The invasion was completed by 175 BC. This established in the northwestern Indian subcontinent what is called the Indo-Greek Kingdom, dividing the Greeks to the east of the Seleucid Empire to the Graeco-Bactrian Kingdom and the Indo-Greek Kingdoms.

==== Indo-Greek kingdoms (2nd-1st cent. BCE) ====
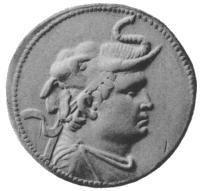
The founder of the Indo-Greek Kingdom Demetrius I (205–171 BCE), wearing the scalp of an elephant, symbol of his conquest of the Indus valley

The Indo-Greek king Menander I (reigned 155–130 BCE) drove the Greco-Bactrians out of Gandhara and beyond the Hindu Kush, becoming king shortly after his victory.

His empire survived him in a fragmented manner until the last independent Greek king, Strato II, disappeared around 10 CE, who may have been supplanted by the Indo-Scythian Northern Satraps, particularly Rajuvula and Bhadayasa, whose coins were often copied on those of the last Indo-Greek kings.

Around 125 BCE, the Greco-Bactrian king Heliocles, son of Eucratides, fled from the Yuezhi invasion of Bactria and relocated to Gandhara, pushing the Indo-Greeks east of the Jhelum River. The last known Indo-Greek ruler was Theodamas, from the Bajaur area of Gandhara, mentioned on a 1st-century CE signet ring, bearing the Kharoṣṭhī inscription "Su Theodamasa" ("Su" was the Greek transliteration of the Kushan royal title "Shau" ("Shah" or "King")).

It is during this period that the fusion of Hellenistic and South Asian mythological, artistic and religious elements becomes most apparent, especially in the region of Gandhara. The Buddhist faith flourished under the Indo-Greek kings, especially Menander who was arguably the most powerful of them all, and figured in the Buddhist text Milinda Panha. It was also a period of great cultural syncretism, exemplified by the development of Greco-Buddhism in the region of Gandhara.

Local Greek rulers still exercised a feeble and precarious power along the borderland, but the last vestige of the Greco-Indian rulers was finished by a people known to the old Chinese as the Yuezhi, who founded the Kushan Empire and expanded to the east during the 1st century CE.

===== Apracharajas (1st cent. BCE–78 CE) =====
The Apracharajas, also known as Avacarajas, were a local ruling dynasty situated in the region of Gandhara, ruling from the time of the governance of Menander II (90–85/65 BCE) within the Indo-Greek Kingdom, during Indo-Parthian rule in the 1st c. CE, and ending with the establishment of Kushan rule in 78 CE. Their capital, known as Apracapura or Avacapura, was located in Bajaur, and their principal domain was between Taxila and Bajaur. (Note: Neelis (2010, p. 118): "The domain of the Apracas was probably centred in Bajaur and extended to Swat, Gandhara, Taxila and other parts of Eastern Afghanistan.") Archaeological evidence establishes dynastic affiliations between them and the rulers of Oddiyana in modern-day Swat. (Note: Neelis (2010, p. 119): "The apracas were also connected by marital alliance with the Odi kings in the Swat valley since a royal relative and officer named Suhasoma in a Buddhist reliquary inscription of Senavarman was married to Vasavadatta.")

=== Indo-Parthian rule (1st c. CE) ===
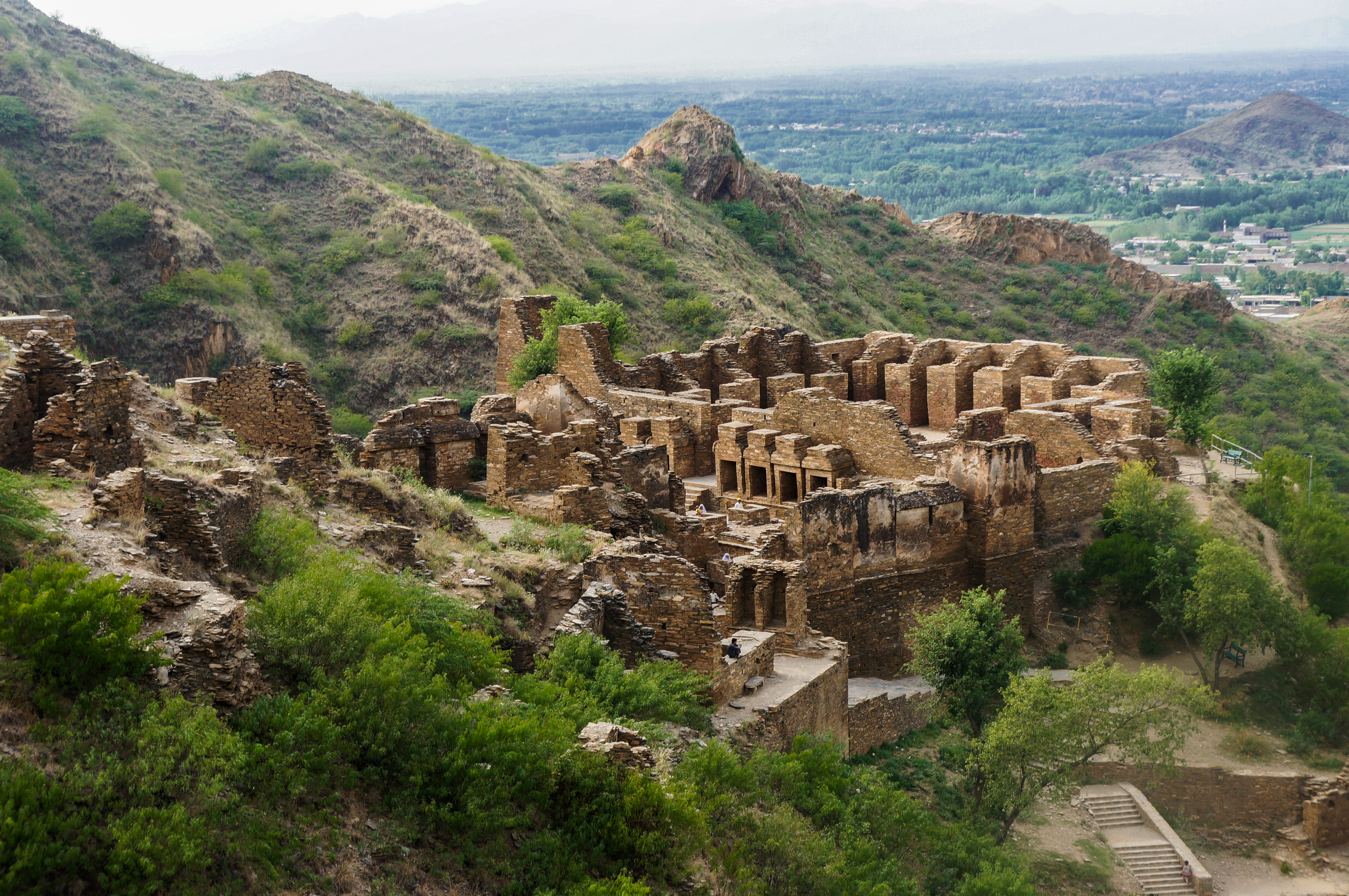
Ancient Buddhist monastery Takht-i-Bahi (a UNESCO World Heritage Site) constructed by the Indo-Parthians

The Indo-Parthian Kingdom (19 CE–226 CE) was founded when the governor of Drangiana (Sakastan) Gondophares (19-46 CE) declared independence from the Parthian Empire. He would later make expeditions to the east, conquer territory from the Indo-Scythians and Indo-Greeks and thus transforming his kingdom into an empire. (Note: "As a result, the Indo-Greek kingdom emerged to the south but it did not exist long and was soon replaced by the Indo-Parthian kingdom.") The domains of the Indo-Parthians were greatly reduced following the invasions of the Kushans in the second half of the 1st century. They managed to retain control of Sakastan, until its conquest by the Sasanian Empire in c. 224/5.

The Indo-Parthian Kingdom was ruled by the Gondopharid dynasty, named after its first ruler Gondophares. These kings have traditionally been referred to as Indo-Parthians, as their coinage was often inspired by the Arsacid dynasty, but they probably belonged to wider groups of Iranic tribes who lived east of Parthia proper, and there is no evidence that all the kings who assumed the title Gondophares, which means "Holder of Glory", were even related.

During the dominion of the Indo-Parthians, Apracharaja Sasan, as described on numismatic evidence identifying him as the nephew of Aspavarma, emerged as a figure of significance.

In 46 CE Philostratus and Apollonius of Tyana visited Gondophares's successor Phraotes. They describe his kingdom as containing the old territory of Porus. Following an exchange with the king, Phraotes is reported to have subsidised both barbarians and neighbouring states, to avert incursions into his kingdom.

According to Philostratus and Apollonius of Tyana, the Gandharans living between the Kabul River and Taxila had houses appearing as single-story structures from the outside, but upon entering, underground rooms were also present. They describe Taxila as being the same size as Nineveh, being walled like a Greek city whilst also being shaped with Narrow roads.

=== Kushan rule and Indo-Scythian kingdom (1st–4th cent. CE) ===
==== Yuezhi and the Kushan Empire ====
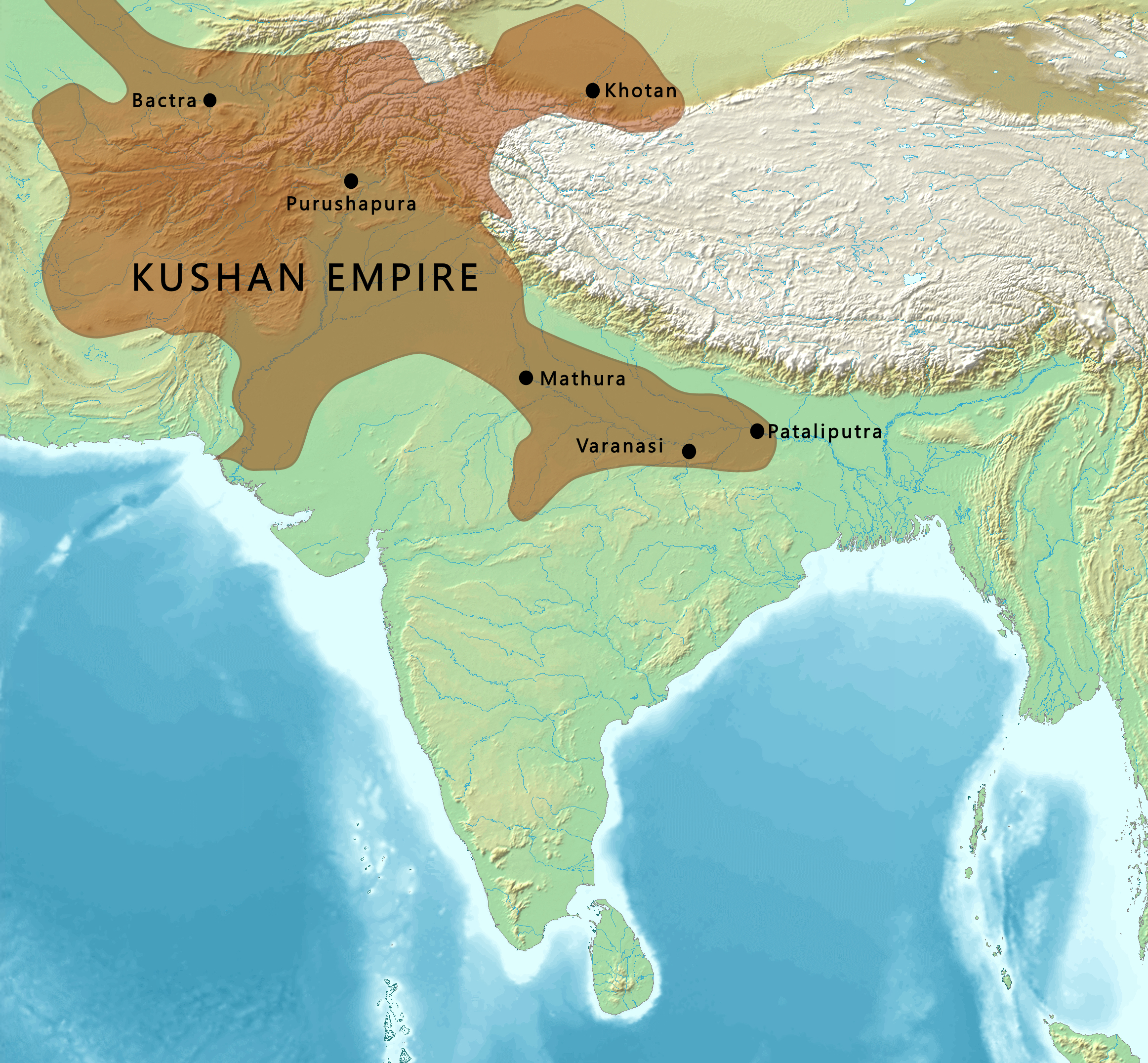
A map of India in the 2nd century AD showing the extent of the Kushan Empire (in brown) during the reign of Kanishka. Most historians consider the empire to have variously extended as far east as the middle Ganges plain, to Varanasi in the eastern Gangetic plain, or probably even Pataliputra.

The Yuezhi were an ancient people first described in Chinese histories as nomadic pastoralists living in an arid grassland area in the western part of the modern Chinese province of Gansu, during the 1st millennium BC. After a major defeat at the hands of the Xiongnu in 176 BC, the Yuezhi split into two groups migrating in different directions: the Greater Yuezhi (Note: Dà Yuèzhī 大月氏) and Lesser Yuezhi. (Note: Xiǎo Yuèzhī 小月氏) This started a complex domino effect that radiated in all directions and, in the process, set the course of history for much of Asia for centuries to come. The migration of the Yuezhi pushed the Sakas (Scythians) southwards into South Asia.

==== Indo-Scythian rule (c. 80 BCE–1st/2n cent. CE) ====
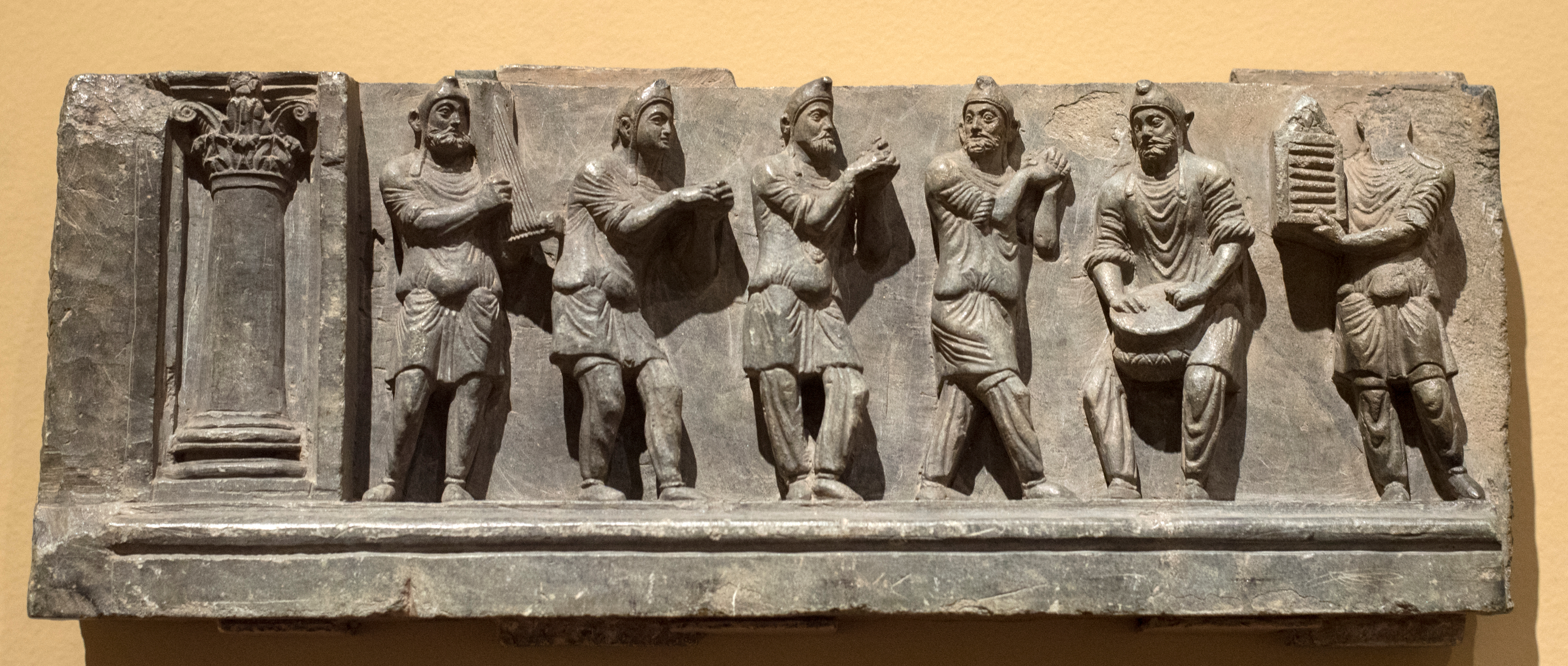
One of the Buner reliefs showing Scythian soldiers dancing. Cleveland Museum of Art.

The presence of the Scythians in modern Pakistan and north-western India during the first century BCE was contemporaneous with the Indo-Greek kingdoms there, and they apparently initially recognized the power of the local Greek rulers. Maues first conquered Gandhara and Taxila in present-day Afghanistan and Pakistan c. 80 BCE, but his kingdom disintegrated after his death. In the east, the Indian king Vikrama retook Ujjain from the Indo-Scythians and celebrated his victory by establishing the Vikrama era in 58 BCE. Indo-Greek kings again ruled and prospered after Maues, as indicated by the profusion of coins from Kings Apollodotus II and Hippostratos. In 55 BCE, under Azes I, the Indo-Scythians took control of northwestern India with their victory over Hippostratos.

The Indo-Scythians were descended from the Sakas (Scythians), who were displaced by the Yuezhi, and migrated from Central Asia into South Asia from the middle of the 2nd century BCE to the 1st century BCE. The Indo-Scythians in turn displaced the Indo-Greeks, and ruled a kingdom (c. 150 BCE–400 CE) that stretched from Gandhara to Mathura. The first Indo-Scythian king Maues established Saka hegemony by conquering Indo-Greek territories. The Indo-Scythian migrations had lasting effects on Bactria, Kabul and the Indian subcontinent and Rome and Parthia in the west. Ancient Roman historians, including Arrian and Claudius Ptolemy, have mentioned that the ancient Sakas ("Sakai") were nomadic people. The first rulers of the Indo-Scythian kingdom were Maues (c. 85–60 BCE) and Vonones (c. 75–65 BCE).

The Indo-Scythians were subjugated by the Kushan Empire's Kujula Kadphises (1st c. CE) or Kanishka (2nd c. CE). (Note: Kharapallana and Vanaspara are known from an inscription discovered in Sarnath and dated to the third year of Kanishka, in which they pledged allegiance to the Kushanas.) The Saka continued to govern as satraps, (Note: "The titles "Kshatrap" and "Mahakshatrapa" certainly show that the Western Kshatrapas were originally feudatories") forming the Northern Satraps and Western Satraps. The power of the Saka rulers began to decline during the 2nd century CE after the Indo-Scythians were defeated by the Satavahana emperor Gautamiputra Satakarni. Indo-Scythian rule in the northwestern subcontinent ended when the last Western Satrap, Rudrasimha III, was defeated by the Gupta emperor Chandragupta II in 395 CE.

==== Establishment of the Kushan Empire (1st. c. CE) ====
The Greater Yuezhi initially migrated northwest into the Ili Valley (on the modern borders of China and Kazakhstan), where they reportedly displaced elements of the Sakas. They in turn were driven from the Ili Valley by the Wusun and migrated southward to Sogdia and later settled in Bactria.

During the 1st century BC, one of the five major Greater Yuezhi tribes in Bactria, the Kushanas, (Note: Chinese: 貴霜; pinyin: Guìshuāng) began to subsume the other tribes and neighbouring peoples. The subsequent Kushan Empire (30–375 CE), at its peak in the 3rd century CE, stretched from Turfan in the Tarim Basin in the north to Pataliputra on the Gangetic plain of India in the south.

The Kushans, one of the five Yuezhi-tribes, conquered Bactria after having been defeated by the Xiongnu and forced to retreat from the Central Asian steppes. The Yuezhi fragmented the region of Bactria into five distinct territories, with each tribe of the Yuezhi assuming dominion over a separate kingdom. However, a century after this division, Kujula Kadphises of the Kushan tribe emerged victorious by destroying the other four Yuezhi tribes and consolidating his reign as king. Kujula then invaded Parthia and annexed the upper reaches of the Kabul River before further conquering Jibin.

In 78 CE the Indo-Parthians seceded Gandhara to the Kushans with Kujula Kadphises son Vima Takto succeeding the Apracharaja Sases in Taxila and further conquering Tianzhu (India) before installing a general as a satrap.

==== Kushan Buddhist Gandhāran culture and society ====
According to the Xiyu Zhuan, the inhabitants residing in the upper reaches of the Kabul River were extremely wealthy and excelled in commerce, with their cultural practices bearing resemblance to those observed in Tianzhu (India). However, the text also characterises them as weak and easily conquered with their political allegiance never being constant. Over time, the region underwent successive annexations by Tianzhu, Jibin, and Parthia during periods of their respective strength, only to be lost when these powers experienced a decline. The Xiyu Zhuan describes Tianzhu's customs as bearing similarities to that of the Yuezhi and the inhabitants riding on elephants in warfare.

The Kushan period is considered the Golden Period of Gandhara. Peshawar Valley and Taxila are littered with ruins of stupas and monasteries of this period. Gandharan art flourished and produced some of the best pieces of sculpture from the Indian subcontinent. Gandhara's culture peaked during the reign of the great Kushan king Kanishka the Great (127 CE – 150 CE). The cities of Taxila (Takṣaśilā) at Sirsukh and Purushapura (modern-day Peshawar) reached new heights. Purushapura along with Mathura became the capital of the great empire stretching from Central Asia to Northern India with Gandhara being in the midst of it. Emperor Kanishka was a great patron of the Buddhist faith; Buddhism spread from India to Central Asia and the Far East across Bactria and Sogdia, where his empire met the Han Empire of China. Buddhist art spread from Gandhara to other parts of Asia. In Gandhara, Mahayana Buddhism flourished and Buddha was represented in human form. Under the Kushans new Buddhist stupas were built and old ones were enlarged. Huge statues of the Buddha were erected in monasteries and carved into the hillsides. Kanishka also built the 400-foot Kanishka stupa at Peshawar. This tower was reported by Chinese monks Faxian, Song Yun, and Xuanzang who visited the country. The stupa was built during the Kushan era to house Buddhist relics and was among the tallest buildings in the ancient world.

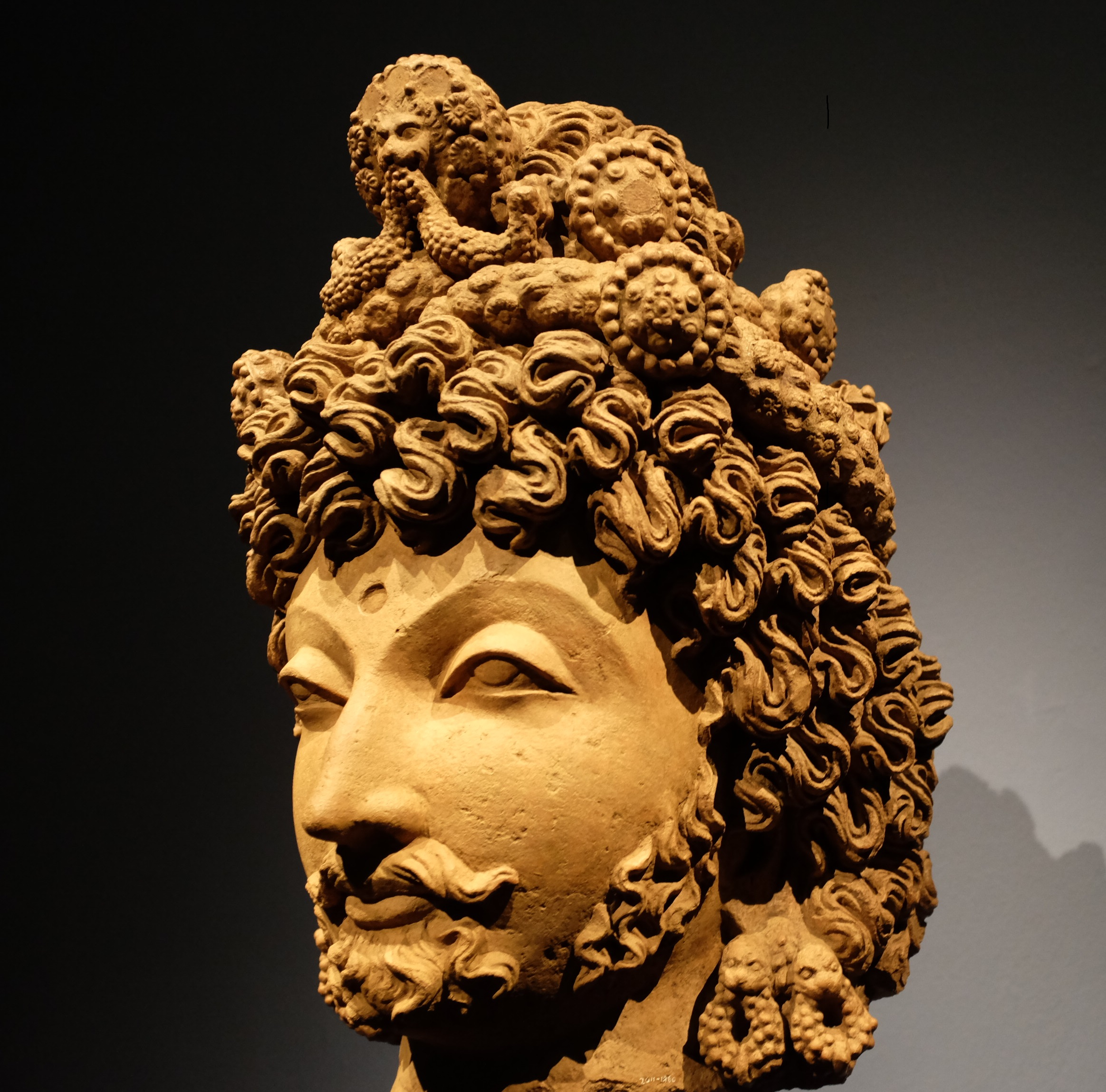
Head of a bodhisattva, c. 4th century CE

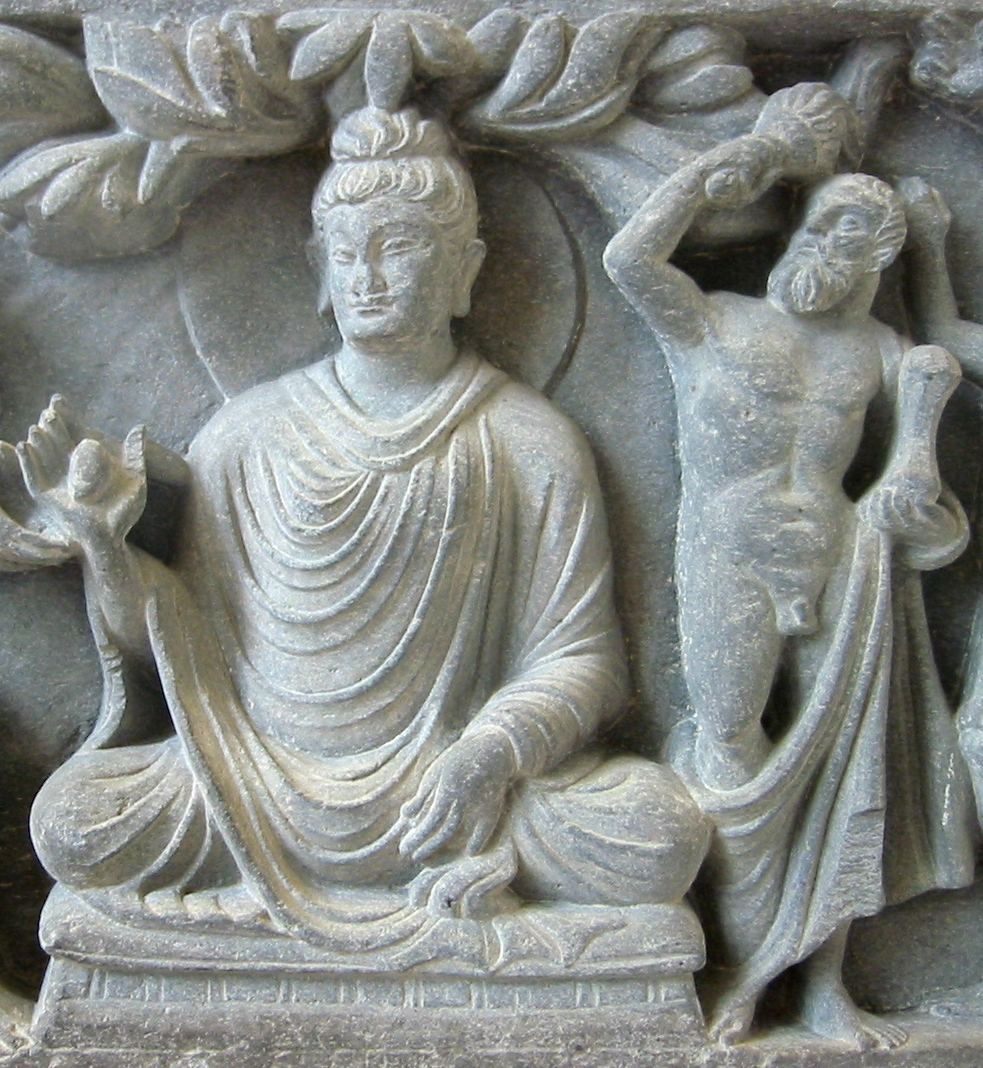
The Buddha and Vajrapani under the guise of Herakles, c. 2nd–3rd century CE

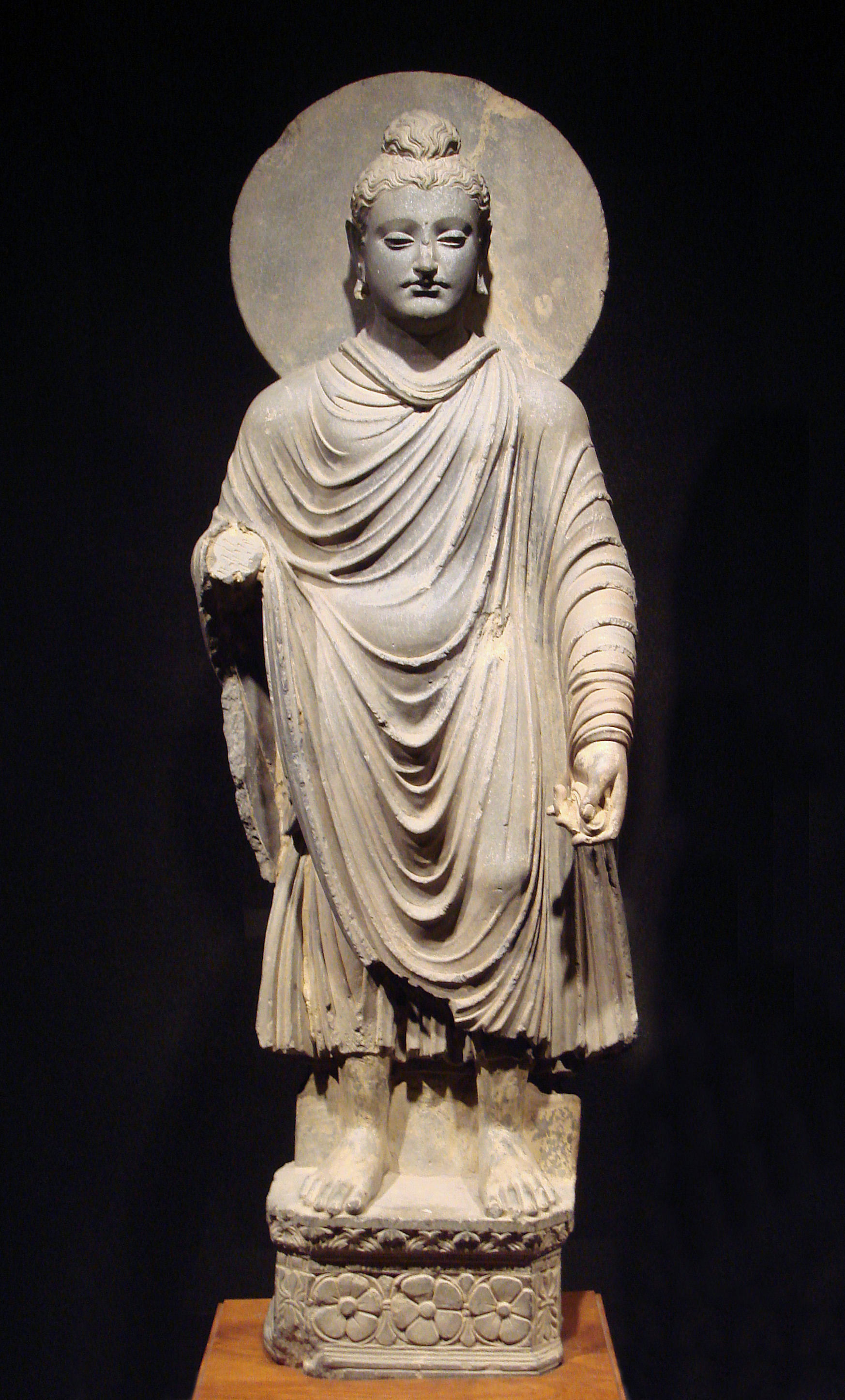
Greco-Buddhist standing Buddha from Gandhara (1st–2nd century), Tokyo National Museum

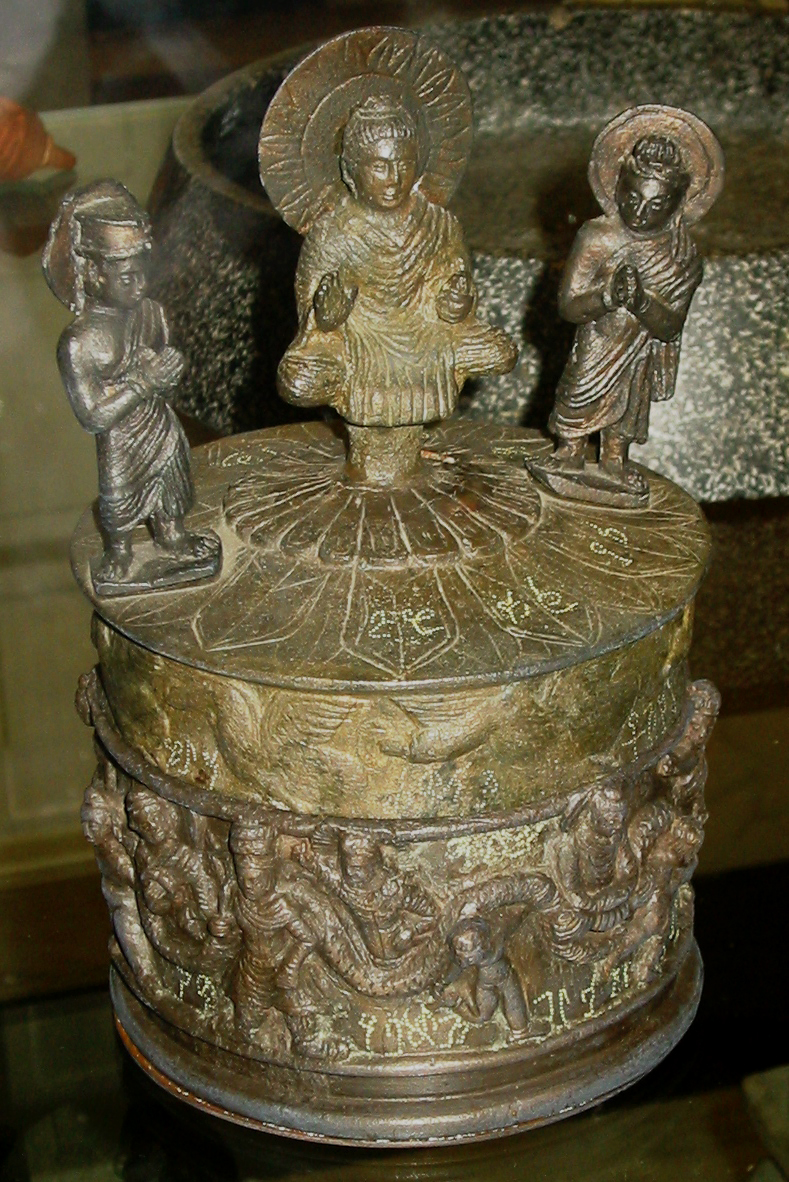
Casket of Kanishka the Great, with Buddhist motifs

=== Kidarites (4th-5th c. CE) ===
The Kidarites conquered Peshawar and parts of the northwest Indian subcontinent including Gandhara probably sometime between 390 and 410 from Kushan empire, around the end of the rule of Gupta Emperor Chandragupta II or beginning of the rule of Kumaragupta I. It is probably the rise of the Hephthalites and the defeats against the Sasanians which pushed the Kidarites into northern India. Their last ruler in Gandhara was Kandik, c. 500 CE.

=== Alchon Huns (5th-6th c. CE) ===
Around 430 King Khingila, the most notable Alchon ruler, emerged and took control of the routes across the Hindu Kush from the Kidarites. (Note: Neelis (2010, p. 162): "The Alchon Huns....established themselves as overlords of northwestern India, and directly contributed to the downfall of the Guptas") Coins of the Alchons rulers Khingila and Mehama were found at the Buddhist monastery of Mes Aynak, southeast of Kabul, confirming the Alchon presence in this area around 450–500 CE. The numismatic evidence as well as the so-called "Hephthalite bowl" from Gandhara, now in the British Museum, suggests a period of peaceful coexistence between the Kidarites and the Alchons, as it features two Kidarite noble hunters, together with two Alchon hunters and one of the Alchons inside a medallion. At one point, the Kidarites withdrew from Gandhara, and the Alchons took over their mints from the time of Khingila.

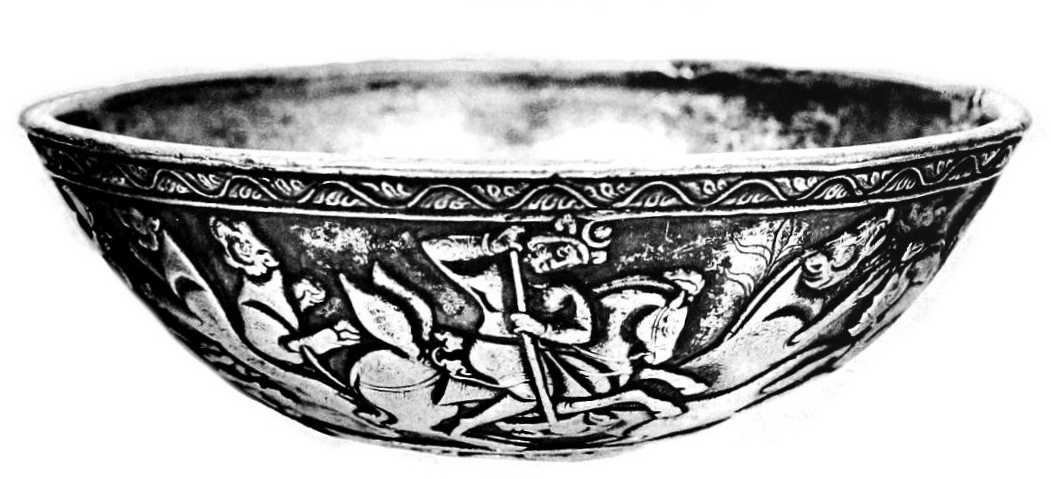
The silver bowl in the British Museum

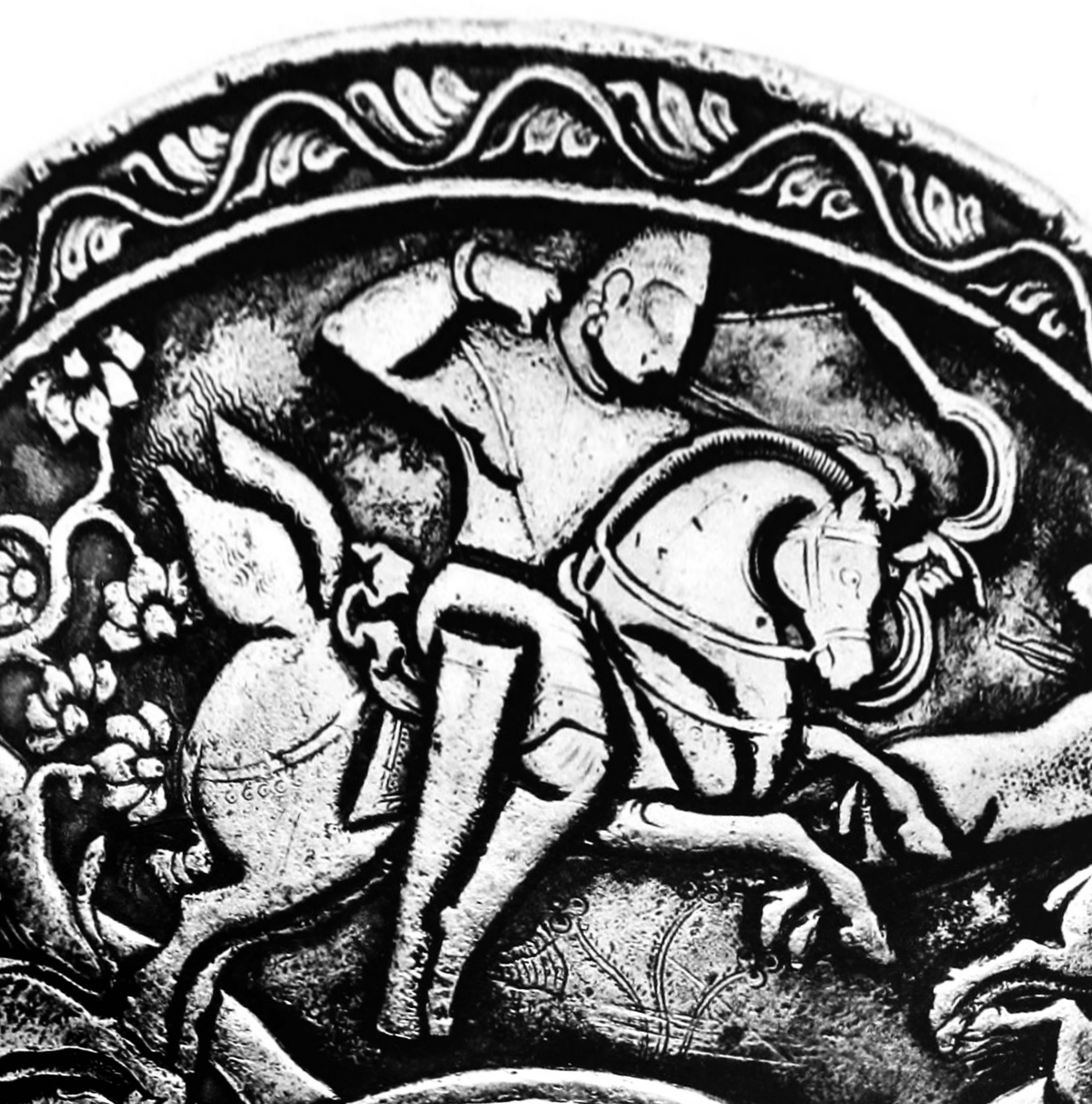
Alchon horseman.

The so-called "Hephthalite bowl" from Gandhara, features two Kidarite hunters wearing characteristic crowns, as well as two Alchon hunters (one of them shown here, with skull deformation), suggesting a period of peaceful coexistence between the two entities. Swat District, Pakistan, 460–479 CE. British Museum.

The Alchons undertook the mass destruction of Buddhist monasteries and stupas at Taxila, a high centre of learning, which never recovered from the destruction. Virtually all of the Alchon coins found in the area of Taxila were found in the ruins of burned down monasteries, where some of the invaders died alongside local defenders during the wave of destructions. It is thought that the Kanishka stupa, one of the most famous and tallest buildings in antiquity, was destroyed by them during their invasion of the area in the 460s CE. The Mankiala stupa was also vandalised during their invasions.

Mihirakula in particular is remembered by Buddhist sources to have been a "terrible persecutor of their religion" in Gandhara. During the reign of Mihirakula, over one thousand Buddhist monasteries throughout Gandhara are said to have been destroyed. In particular, the writings of Chinese monk Xuanzang from 630 CE explained that Mihirakula ordered the destruction of Buddhism and the expulsion of monks. The Buddhist art of Gandhara, in particular Greco-Buddhist art, became extinct around this period. When Xuanzang visited Gandhara in c. 630 CE, he reported that Buddhism had drastically declined in favour of Shaivism and that most of the monasteries were deserted and left in ruins. It is also noted by Kalhana that Brahmins of Gandhara accepted from Mihirakula gifts of Agraharams. Kalhana also noted in his Rajatarangini how Mihirakula oppressed local Brahmins of South Asia and imported Gandharan Brahmins into Kashmir and India and states that he had given thousands of villages to these Brahmins in Kashmir.

=== Turk (7th-9th c. CE) and Hindu (9th-11th c. CE) Shahis ===
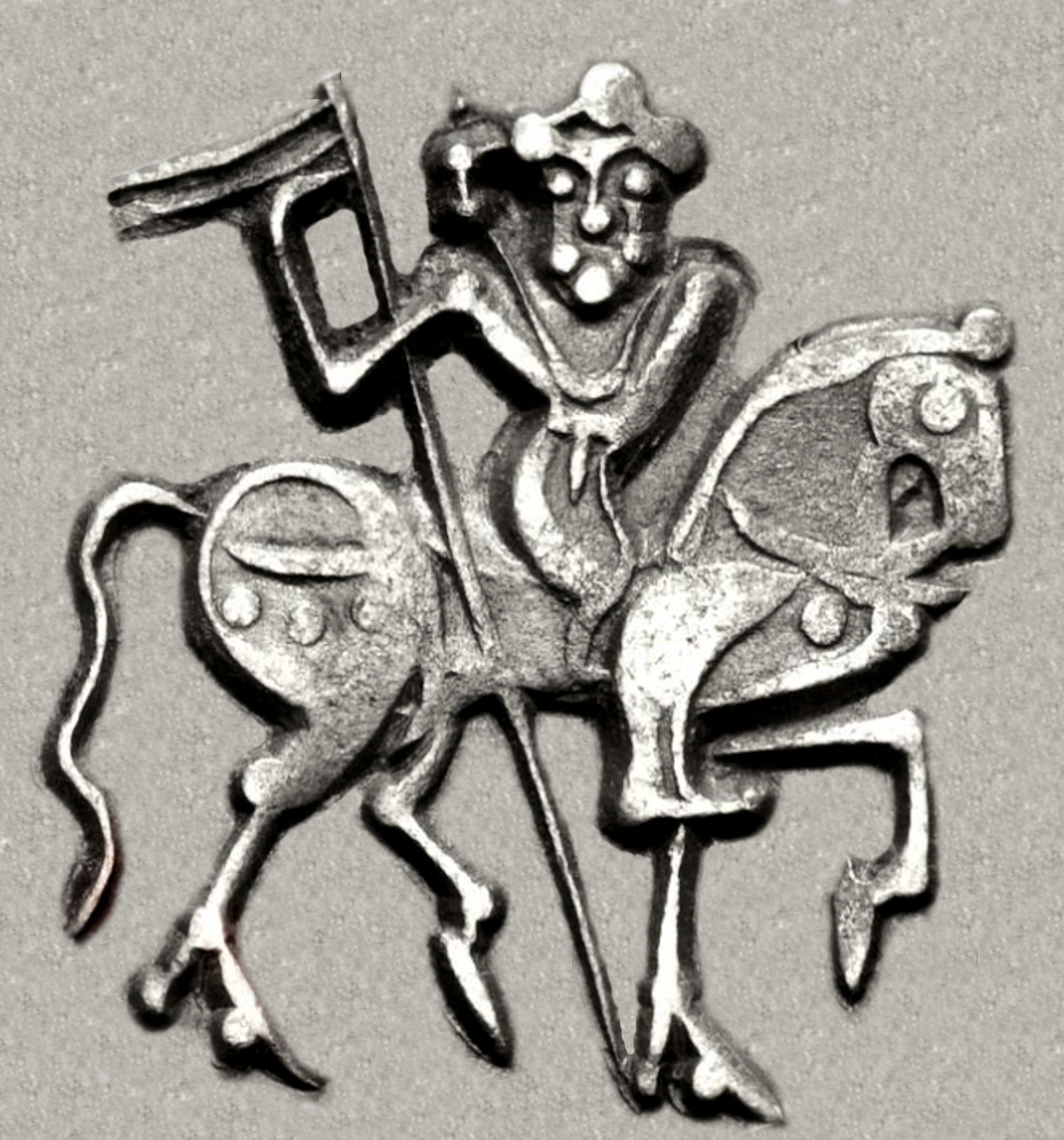
Horseman on a coin of Spalapati, i.e. the "War-lord" of the Shahis. The headgear has been interpreted as a turban.

The Turk Shahis ruled Gandhara until 843 CE when they were overthrown by the Hindu Shahis. The Hindu Shahis are believed to belong to the Uḍi/Oḍi tribe, namely the people of Oddiyana in Gandhara.

The history of the Hindu Shahis begins in 843 CE with Kallar deposing the last Turk Shahi ruler, Lagaturman. Samanta succeeded him, and it was during his reign that the region of Kabul was lost to the Persianate Saffarid dynasty. Lalliya replaced Samanta soon after and re-conquered Kabul whilst also subduing the region of Zabulistan. He is additionally noteworthy for coming into conflict with Samkaravarman of the Utpala dynasty, resulting in his victory and the latter's death in Hazara and was the first Shahi noted by Kalhana. He is depicted as a great ruler with strength to the standard where kings of other regions would seek shelter in his capital of Udabhanda, a change from the previous capital of Kabul. Bhimadeva, the next most notable ruler, is most significant for vanquishing the Samanid Empire in Ghazni and Kabul in response to their conquests, his granddaughter Didda was also the last ruler of the Lohara dynasty. Jayapala then gained control and was brought into conflict with the newly formed Ghaznavid Empire, however, he was eventually defeated. During his rule and that of his son and successor, Anandapala, the kingdom of Lahore was conquered. The following Shahi rulers all resisted the Ghaznavids but were ultimately unsuccessful, resulting in the downfall of the empire in 1026 CE.

=== End of geographical denotation ===
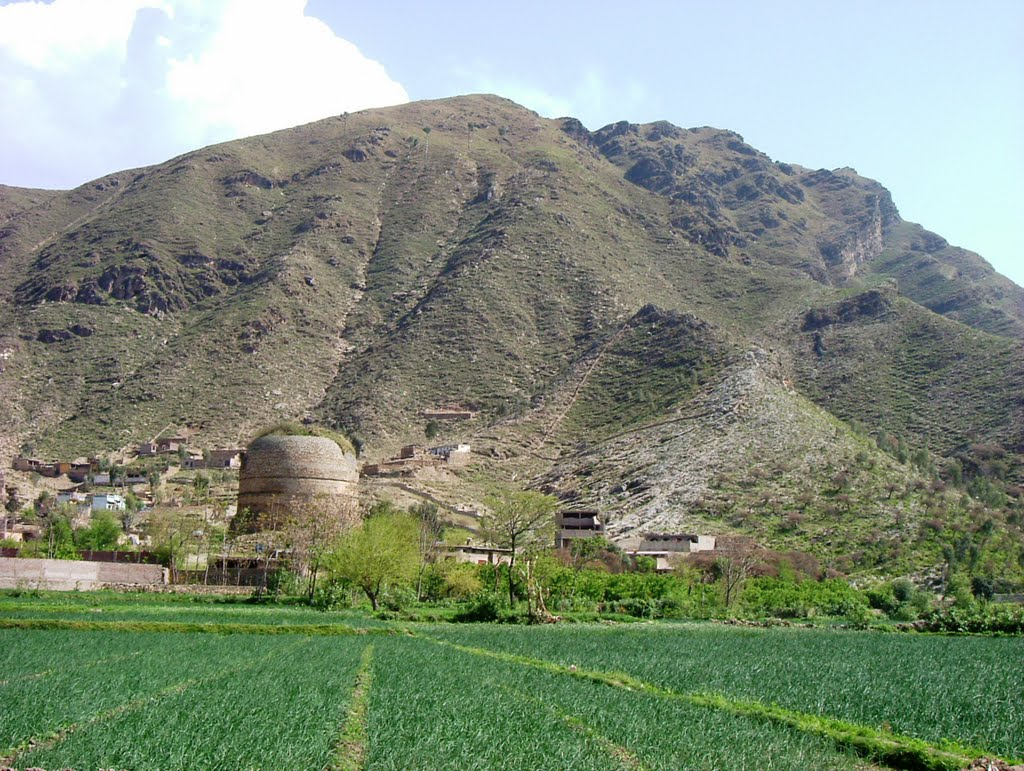
Many stupas, such as the Shingerdar stupa in Ghalegay, are scattered throughout the region near Peshawar.

Gandhara as a geographical term faded into obscurity after the Ghaznavid rule (1026–1186). The area was subsequently ruled by Islamic dynasties and states, starting with the Ghurid dynasty (786–1215), who started their invasion of the subcontinent in 1175. Thereafter the area was part of the Delhi Sultanate (1206–1526), the Mughal Empire (1526–1857), and the British Raj (1858–1947). Since 1947 it belongs to Pakistan.

== Culture ==
=== Language ===
Gandhara's language was a Prakrit or "Middle Indo-Aryan" dialect, usually called Gāndhārī. Under the Kushan Empire, Gāndhārī spread into adjoining regions of South and Central Asia. It used the Kharosthi script, which is derived from the Aramaic script, and it died out about in the 4th century CE.

Linguistic evidence links some groups of the Dardic languages with Gandhari. The Kohistani languages, now all being displaced from their original homelands, were once more widespread in the region and most likely descend from the ancient dialects of the region of Gandhara. The last to disappear was Tirahi, still spoken some years ago in a few villages in the vicinity of Jalalabad in eastern Afghanistan, by descendants of migrants expelled from Tirah by the Afridi Pashtuns in the 19th century. Georg Morgenstierne claimed that Tirahi is "probably the remnant of a dialect group extending from Tirah through the Peshawar district into Swat and Dir". Nowadays, it must be entirely extinct and the region is now dominated by Iranian languages brought in by later immigrations, such as Pashto. Among the modern day Indo-Aryan languages still spoken today, Torwali shows the closest linguistic affinity possible to Niya, a dialect of Gāndhārī.

=== Religion ===
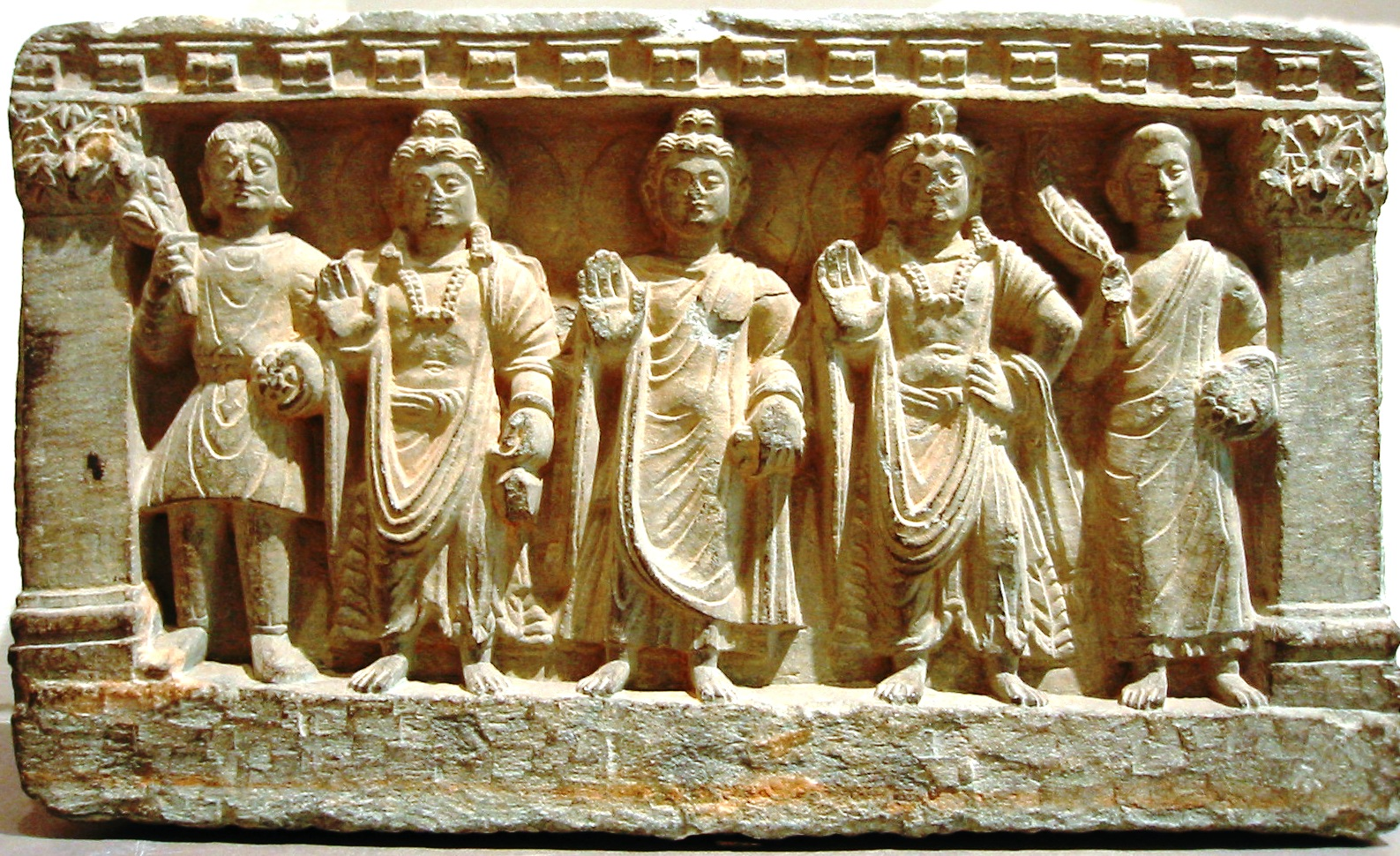
Maitreya Bodhisattva, Gautama Buddha, and Avalokiteśvara Bodhisattva. 2nd–3rd century CE, Gandhāra.

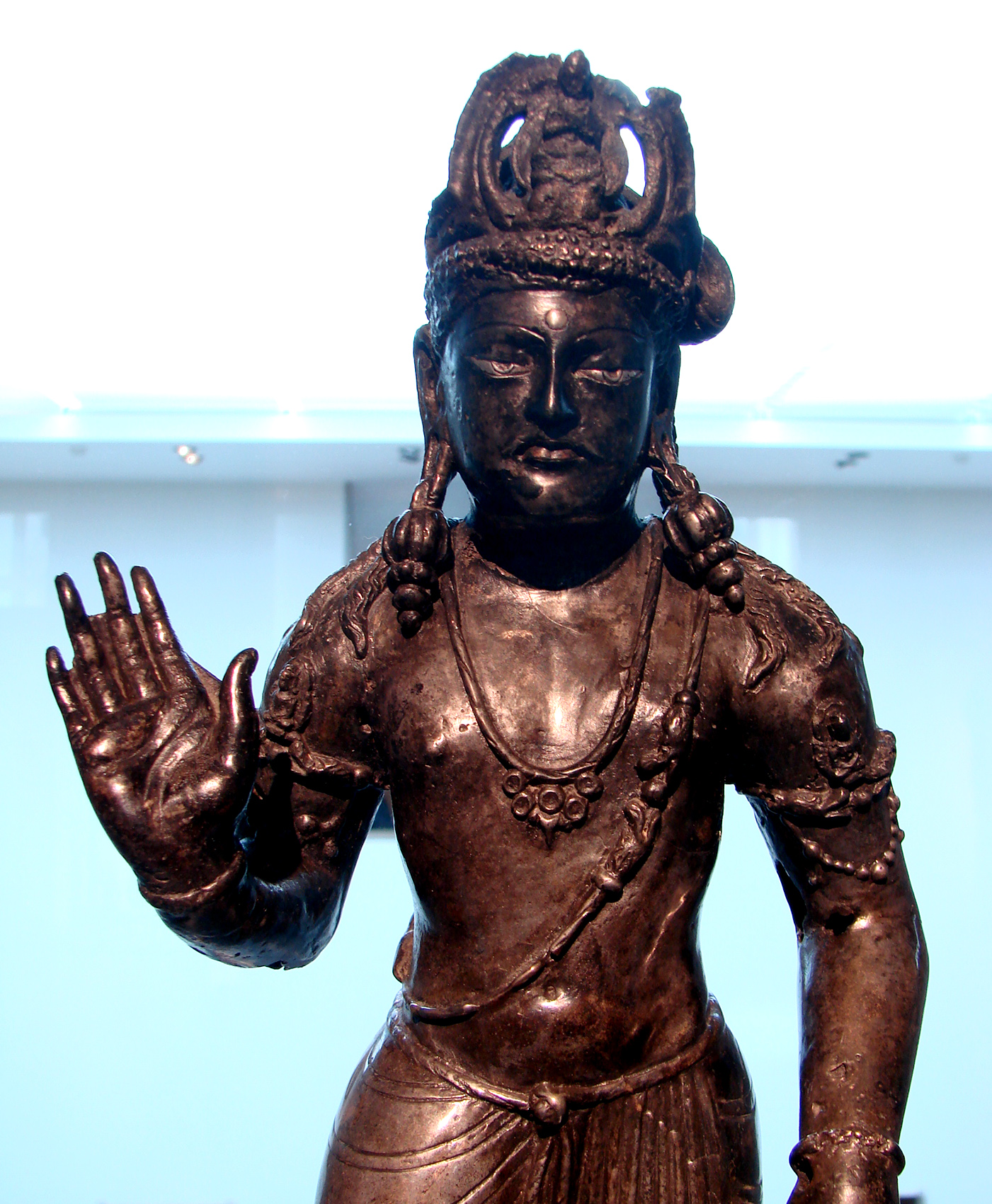
Bronze statue of Avalokiteśvara Bodhisattva. Fearlessness mudrā. 3rd century CE, Gandhāra.

==== Mahāyāna Buddhism ====
As per Pali sources, Buddhism first reached Gandhara following the Third Buddhist council which was held in Pataliputra during the reign of Ashoka in the third-century BCE. Various monks were dispatched to different parts of the empire and the missionary dispatched to Gandhara specifically was Majjhantika who originated from the city of Varanasi in India.

Mahāyāna Pure Land sutras were brought from the Gandhāra region to China as early as 147 CE, when the Kushan monk Lokakṣema began translating some of the first Buddhist sutras into Chinese. The earliest of these translations show evidence of having been translated from the Gāndhārī language. Lokakṣema translated important Mahāyāna sūtras such as the Aṣṭasāhasrikā Prajñāpāramitā Sūtra, as well as rare, early Mahāyāna sūtras on topics such as samādhi, and meditation on the Buddha Akṣobhya. Lokaksema's translations continue to provide insight into the early period of Mahāyāna Buddhism. This corpus of texts often includes and emphasises ascetic practices forest dwelling, and absorption in states of meditative concentration:

Paul Harrison has worked on some of the texts that are arguably the earliest versions we have of the Mahāyāna sūtras, those translated into Chinese in the last half of the second century AD by the Indo-Scythian translator Lokakṣema. Harrison points to the enthusiasm in the Lokakṣema sūtra corpus for the extra ascetic practices, for dwelling in the forest, and above all for states of meditative absorption (samādhi). Meditation and meditative states seem to have occupied a central place in early Mahāyāna, certainly because of their spiritual efficacy but also because they may have given access to fresh revelations and inspiration.

Some scholars believe that the Mahāyāna Longer Sukhāvatīvyūha Sūtra was compiled in the age of the Kushan Empire in the 1st and 2nd centuries CE, by order of Mahīśāsaka bhikṣus which flourished in the Gandhāra region. However, it is likely that the longer Sukhāvatīvyūha owes greatly to the Mahāsāṃghika-Lokottaravāda sect as well for its compilation, and in this sutra, there are many elements in common with the Lokottaravādin Mahāvastu. There are also images of Amitābha Buddha with the bodhisattvas Avalokiteśvara and Mahāsthāmaprāpta which were made in Gandhāra during the Kushan era.

The Mañjuśrīmūlakalpa records that Kaniṣka of the Kushan Empire presided over the establishment of the Mahāyāna Prajñāpāramitā teachings in the northwest. Tāranātha wrote that in this region, 500 bodhisattvas attended the council at Jālandhra monastery during the time of Kaniṣka, suggesting some institutional strength for Mahāyāna in the north-west during this period. Edward Conze goes further to say that Prajñāpāramitā had great success in the north-west during the Kushan period, and may have been the "fortress and hearth" of early Mahāyāna, but not its origin, which he associates with the Mahāsāṃghika branch of Buddhism.

==== Other religions ====
Zoroastrianism also was present in Gandhara since the Persian conquest, likely continuing to the reign of Ashoka and subsequently: some scholars have speculated that its presence may have influenced the development of unique aspects of Mahayana Buddhism in Gandhara.

Gandhara, especially Taxila, during Kushan times also played an influential role in the development of arts and culture of the Hindu synthesis, as the region's artistic traditions were influential to some of the early depictions of deities in Hindu art.

=== Art ===
Lid with seated male figure, Gandhara. (1st–2nd century)

Gandhāra is noted for the distinctive Gandhāra style of Buddhist art, which shows the influence of Hellenistic and Eastern Indo-Aryan influences from the Gangetic Valley. The Gandhāran art flourished and achieved its peak during the Kushan period, from the 1st to the 5th centuries, but it declined and was destroyed after the invasion of the Alchon Huns in the 5th century.

Siddhārtha shown as a bejewelled prince (before Siddhārtha renounces palace life) is a common motif. Stucco, as well as stone, were widely used by sculptors in Gandhara for the decoration of monastic and cult buildings. Buddhist imagery combined with some artistic elements from the cultures of the Hellenistic world. An example is the youthful Buddha, his hair in wavy curls, similar to statutes of Apollo. Sacred artworks and architectural decorations used limestone for stucco composed by a mixture of local crushed rocks (i.e. schist and granite) which resulted compatible with the outcrops located in the mountains northwest of Islamabad.

The artistic traditions of Gandhara art can be divided into the following phases:

- Indo-Greek art; 2nd century BCE to 1st century CE
- Indo-Scythian art; 1st century BCE to 1st century CE
- Kushan art; 1st century CE to 4th century CE
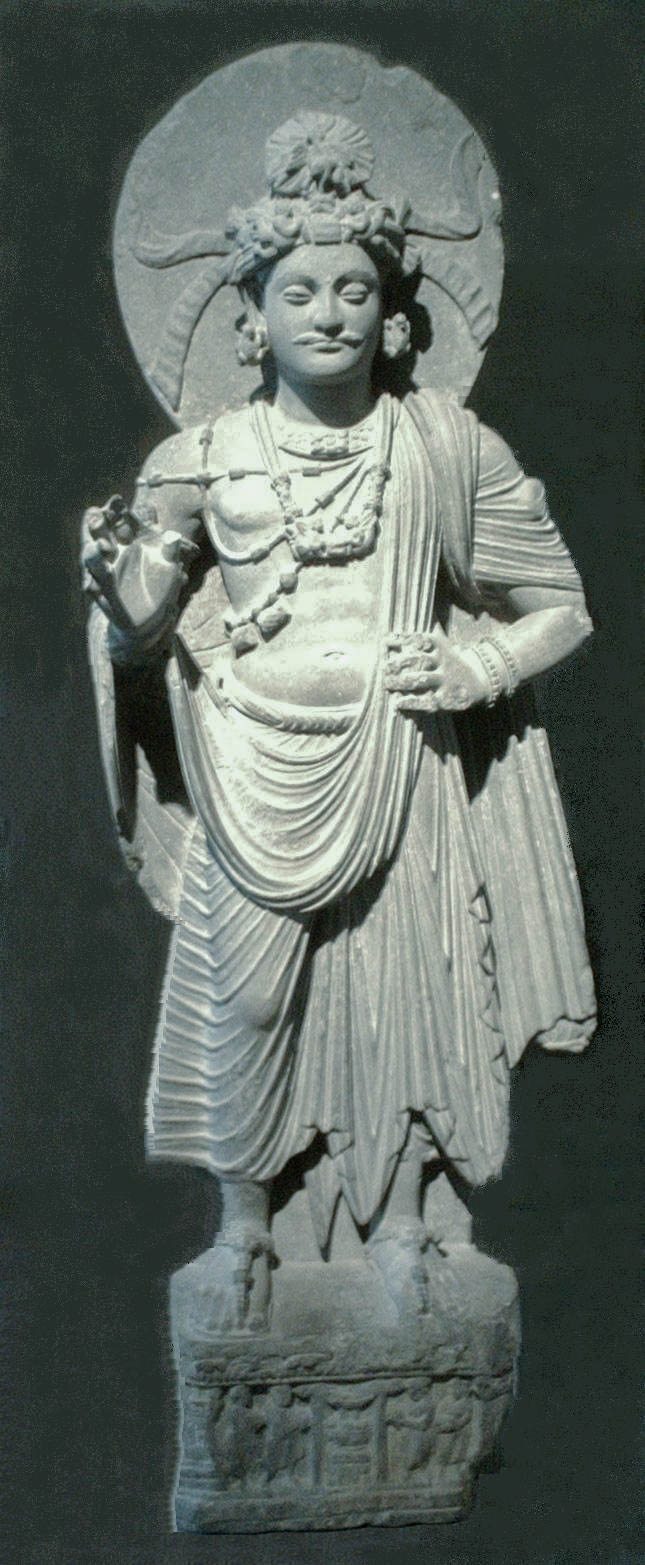
Standing Bodhisattva (1st–2nd century)

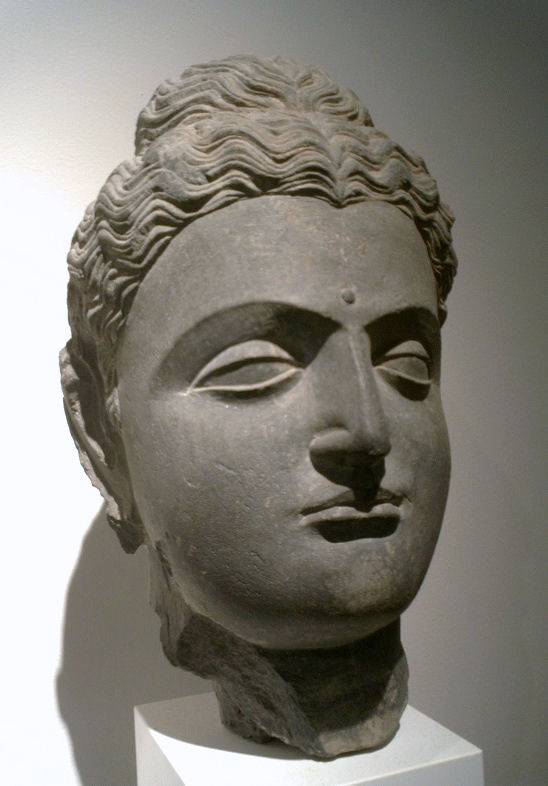
Buddha head (2nd century)

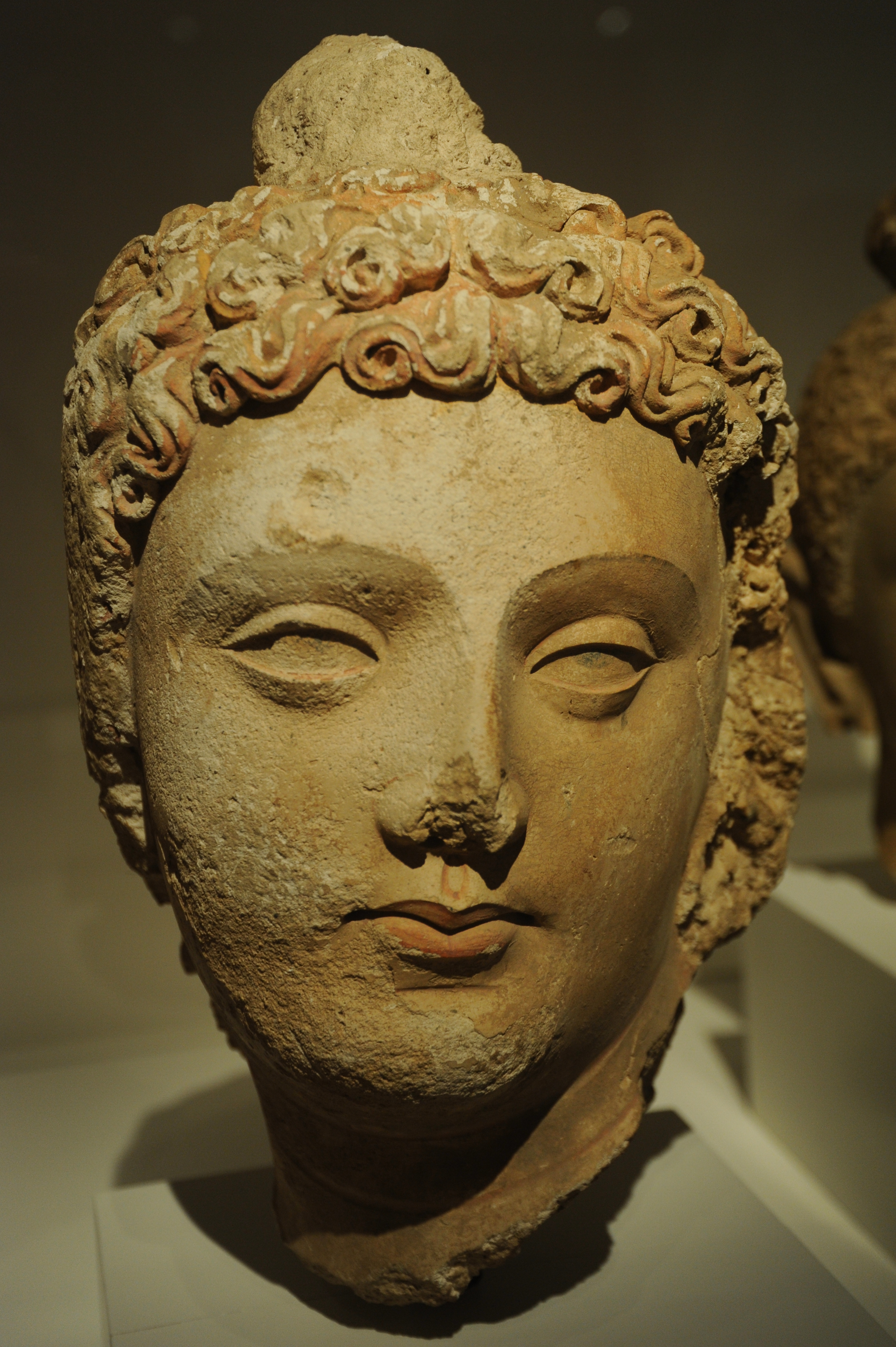
Buddha head (4th–6th century)

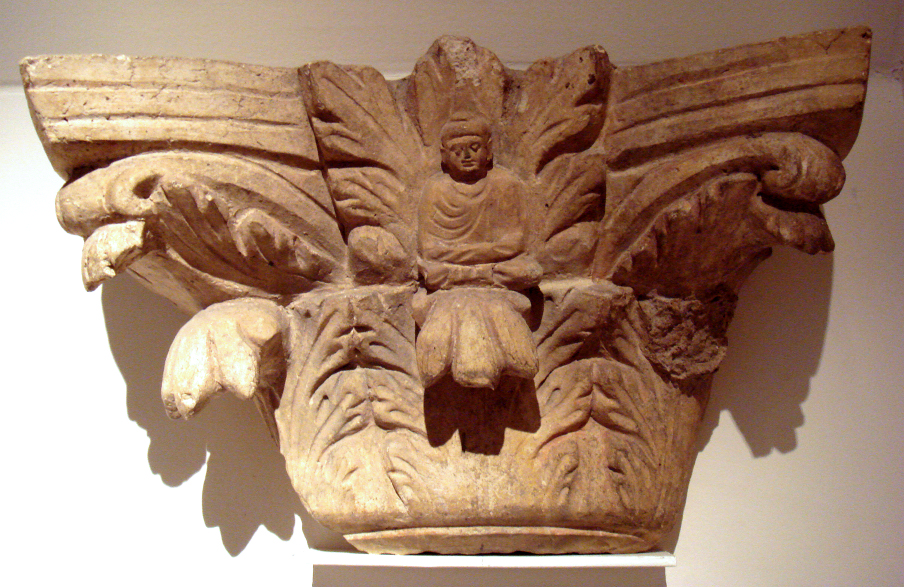
Buddha in acanthus capital

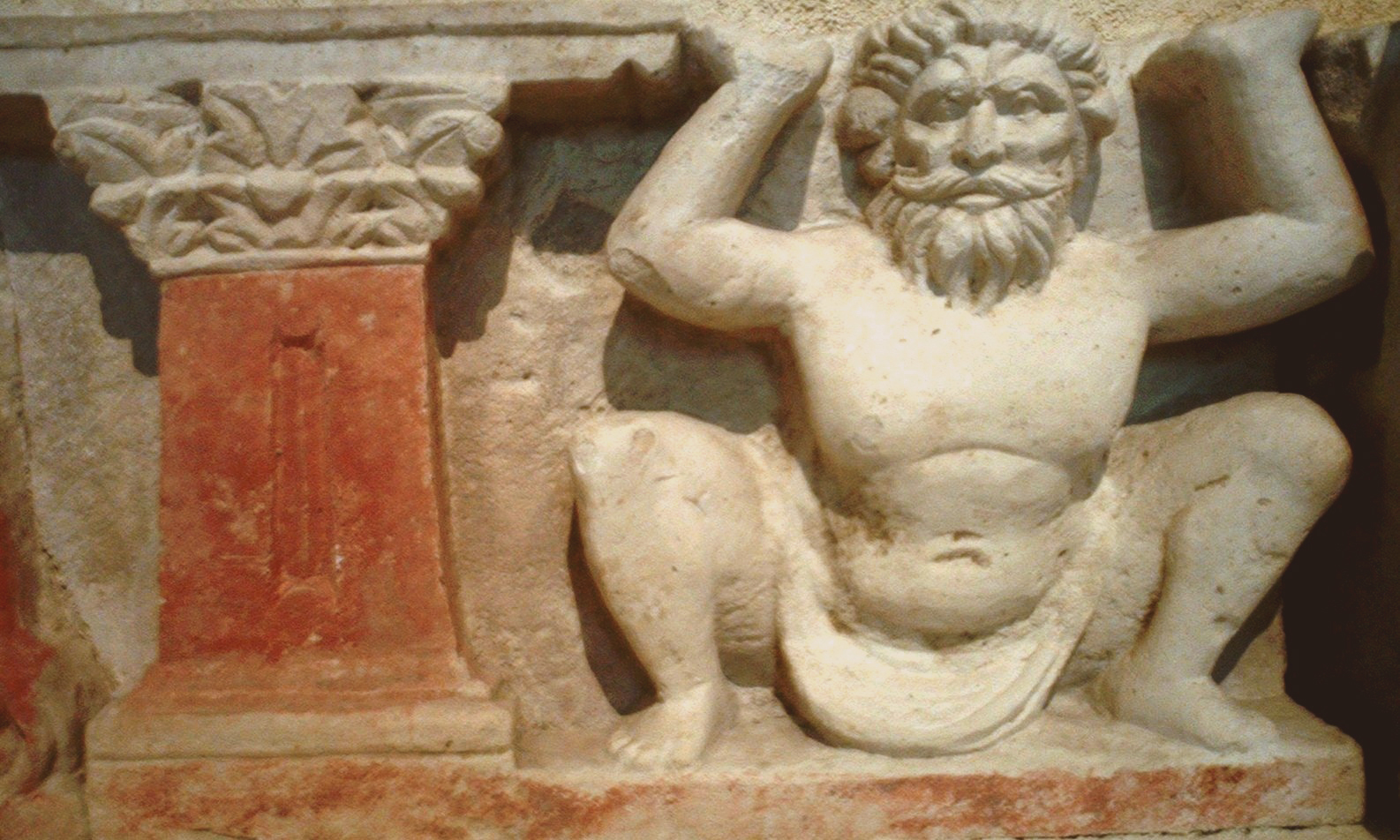
The Greek god Atlas, supporting a Buddhist monument, Hadda

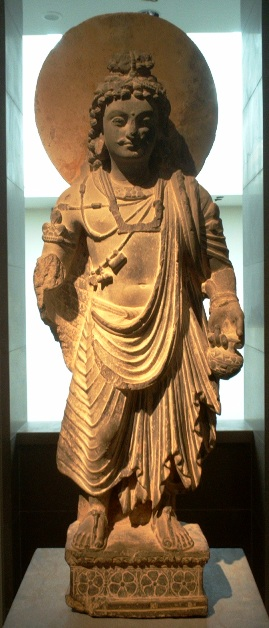
The Bodhisattva Maitreya (2nd century)

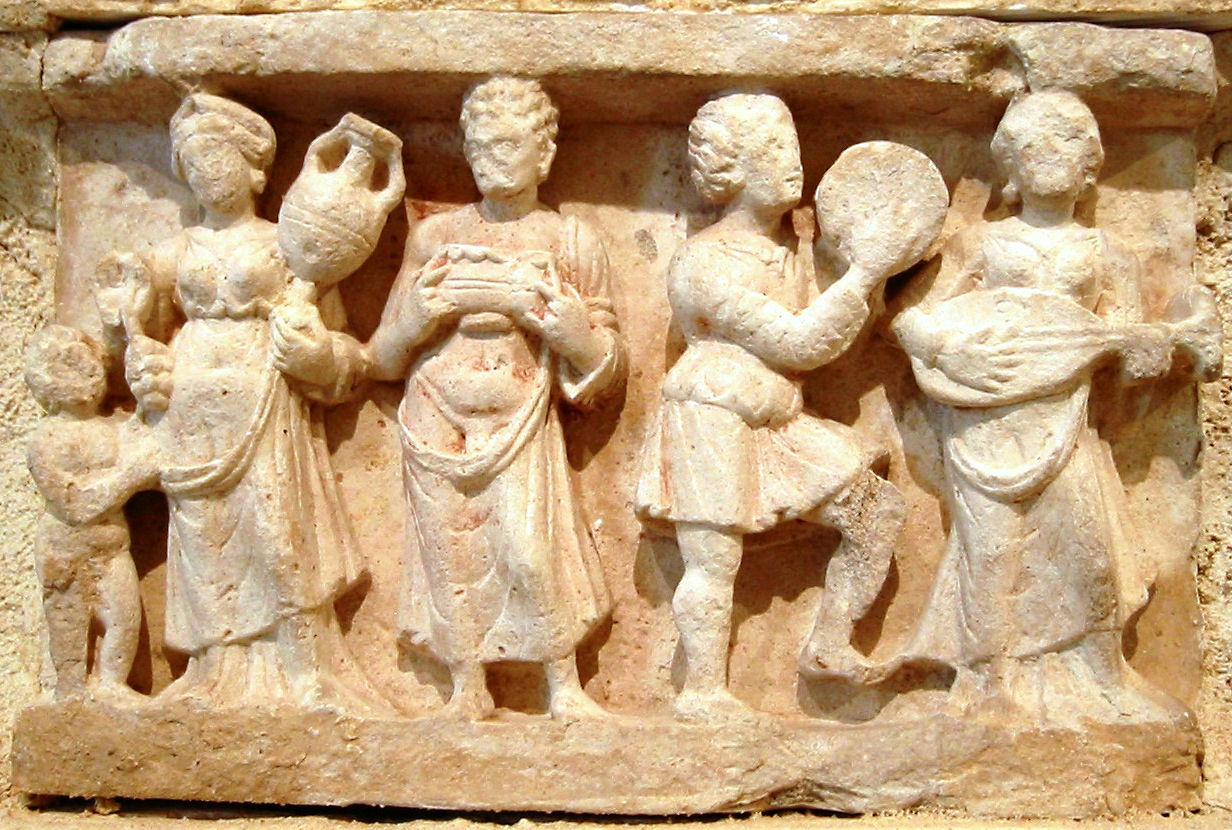
Wine-drinking and music, Hadda (1st–2nd century)

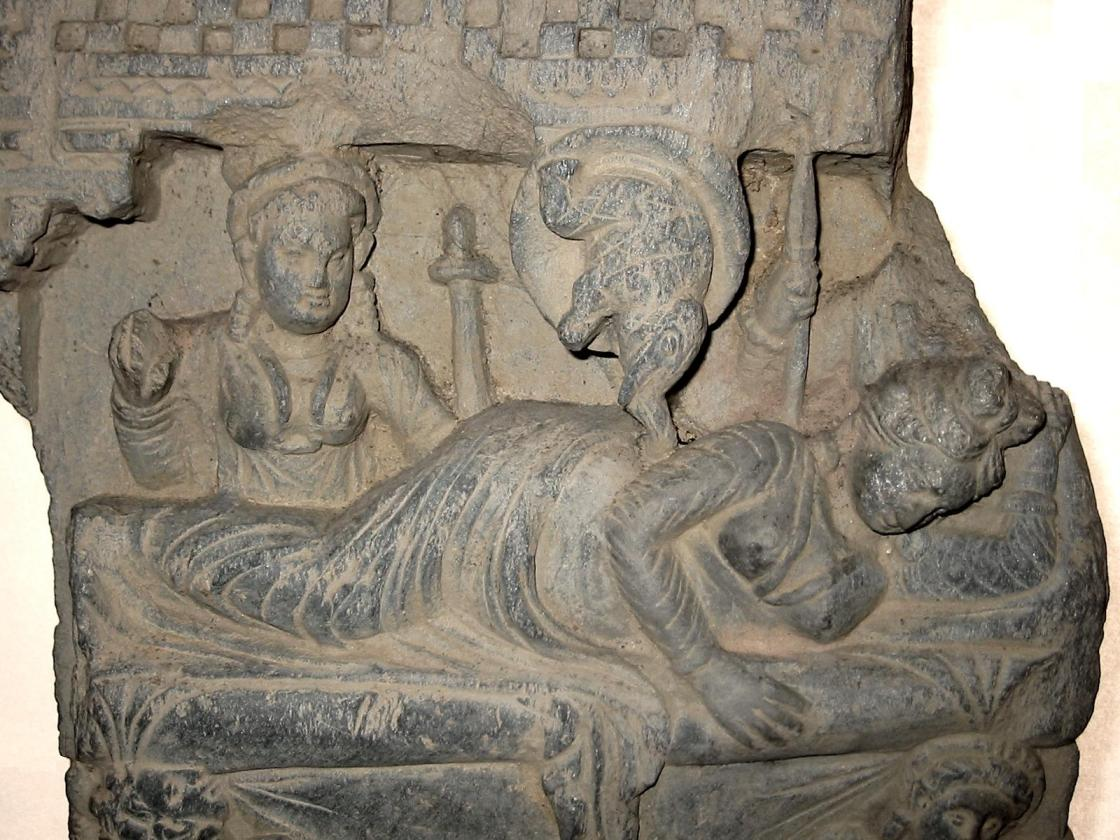
Maya's white elephant dream (2nd–3rd century)

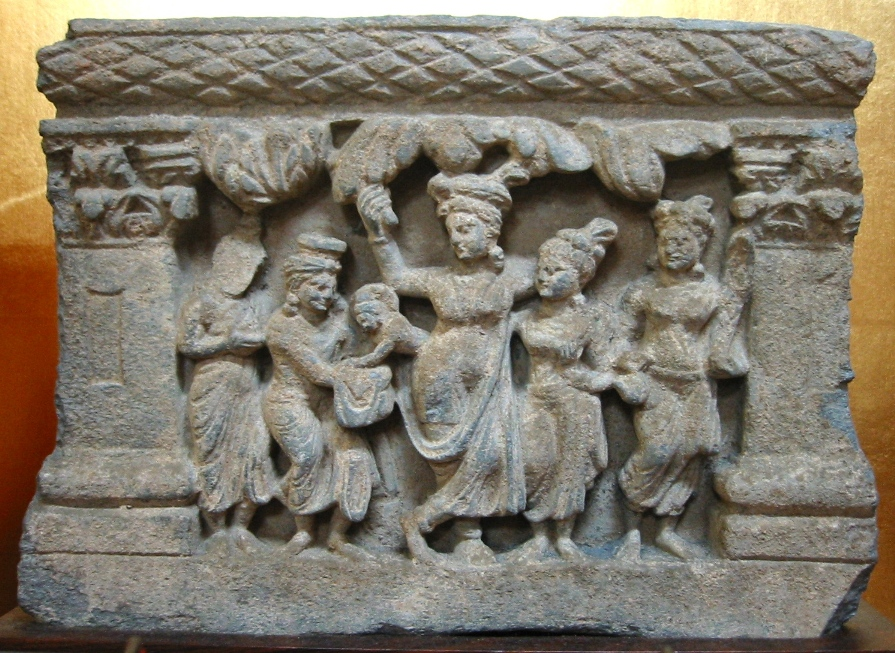
The birth of Siddhārtha (2nd–3rd century)

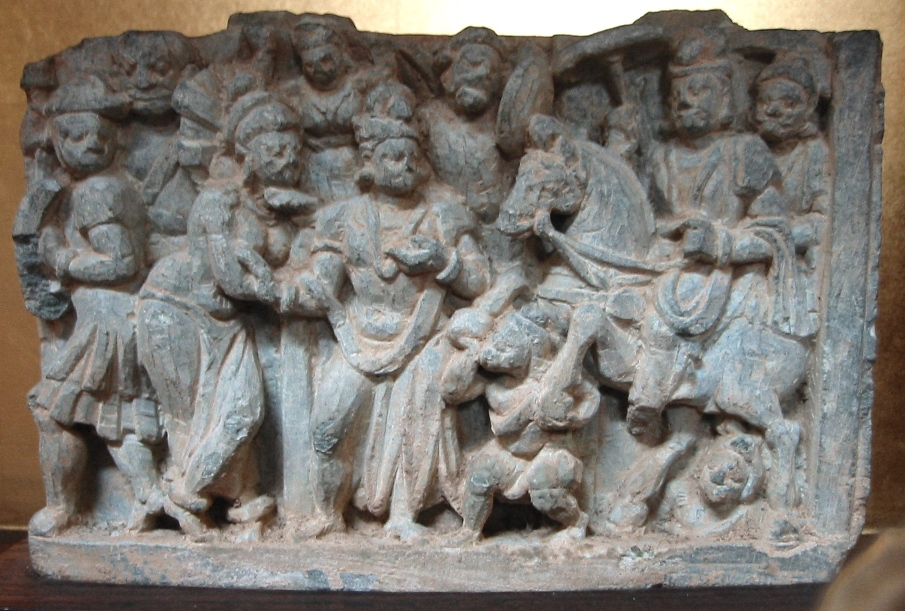
The Great Departure from the Palace (2nd–3rd century)

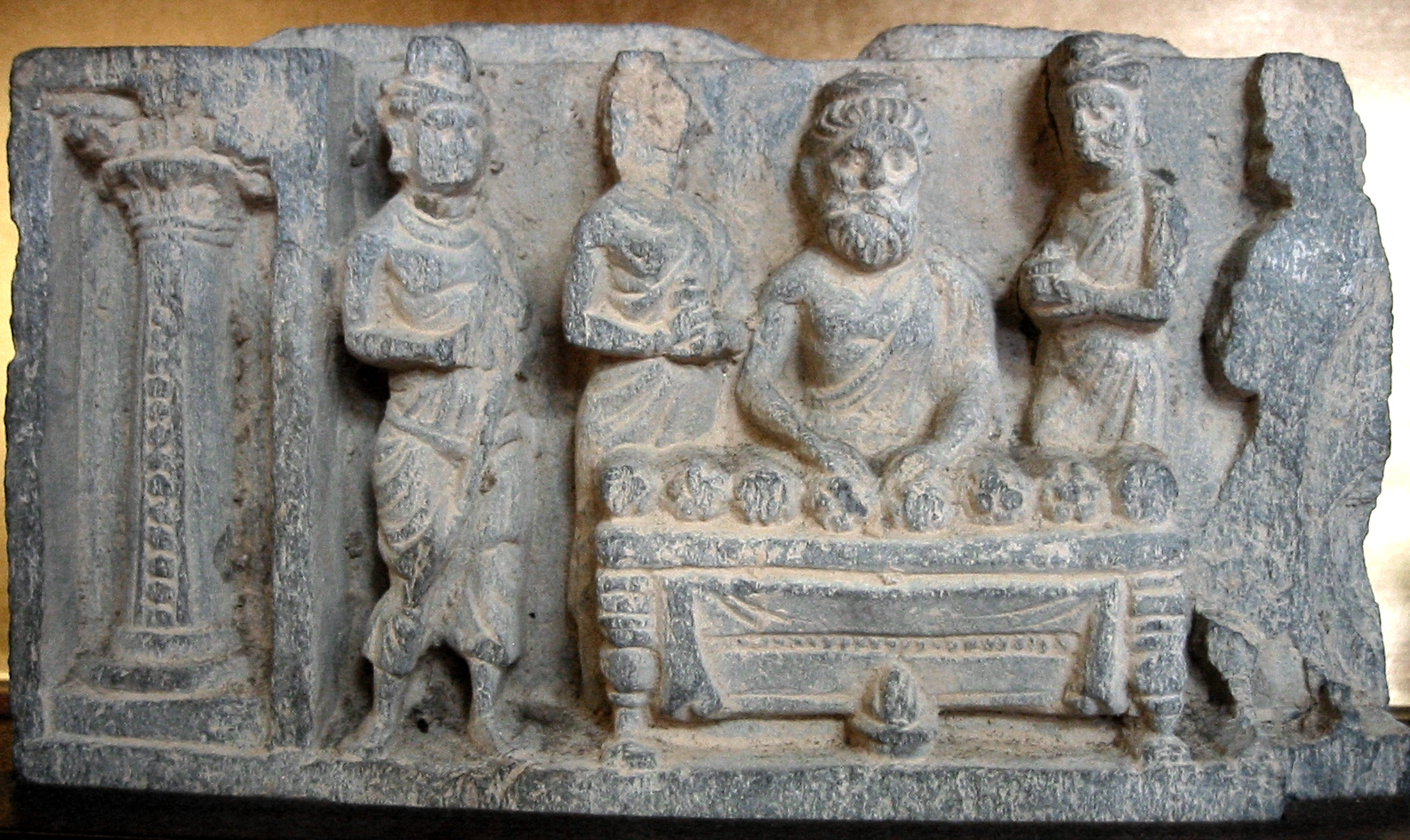
The end of asceticism (2nd–3rd century)

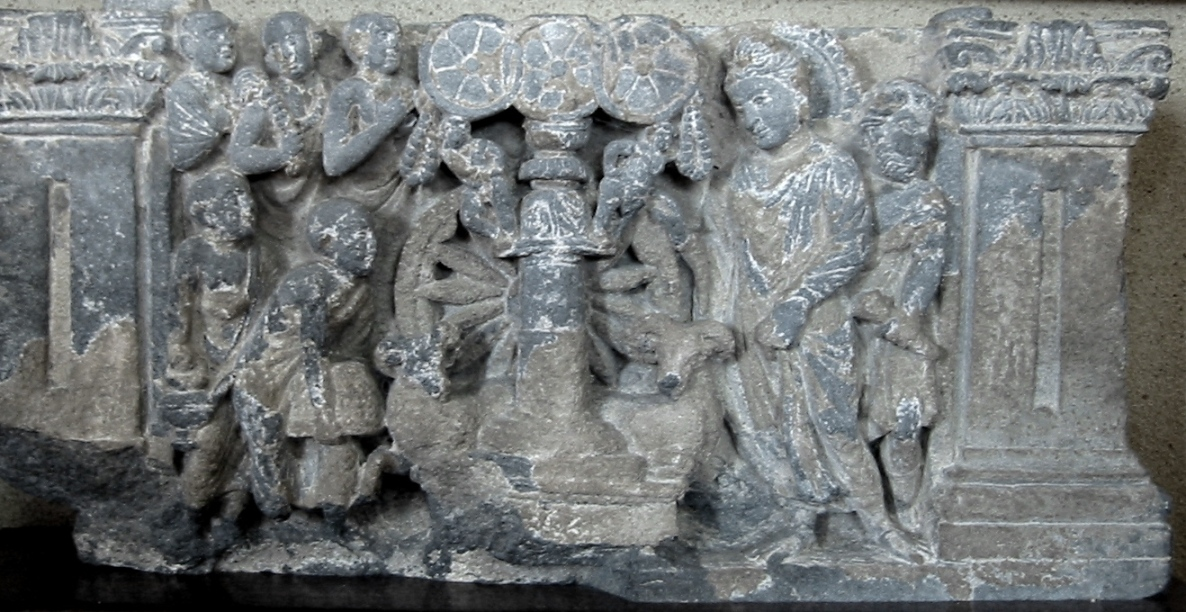
The Buddha preaching at the Deer Park in Sarnath (2nd–3rd century)

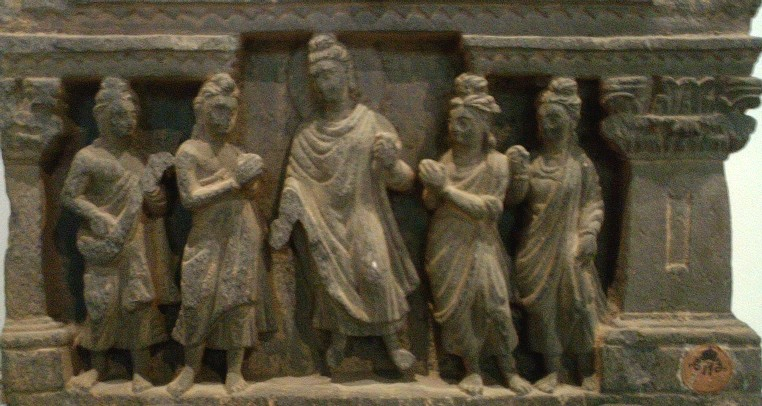
Scene of the life of the Buddha (2nd–3rd century)

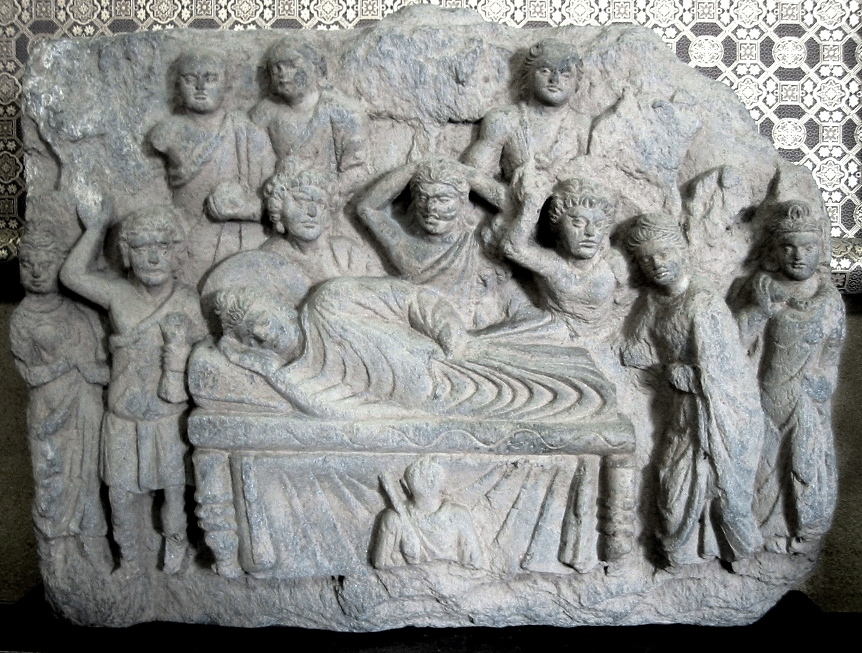
The death of the Buddha, or parinirvana (2nd–3rd century)

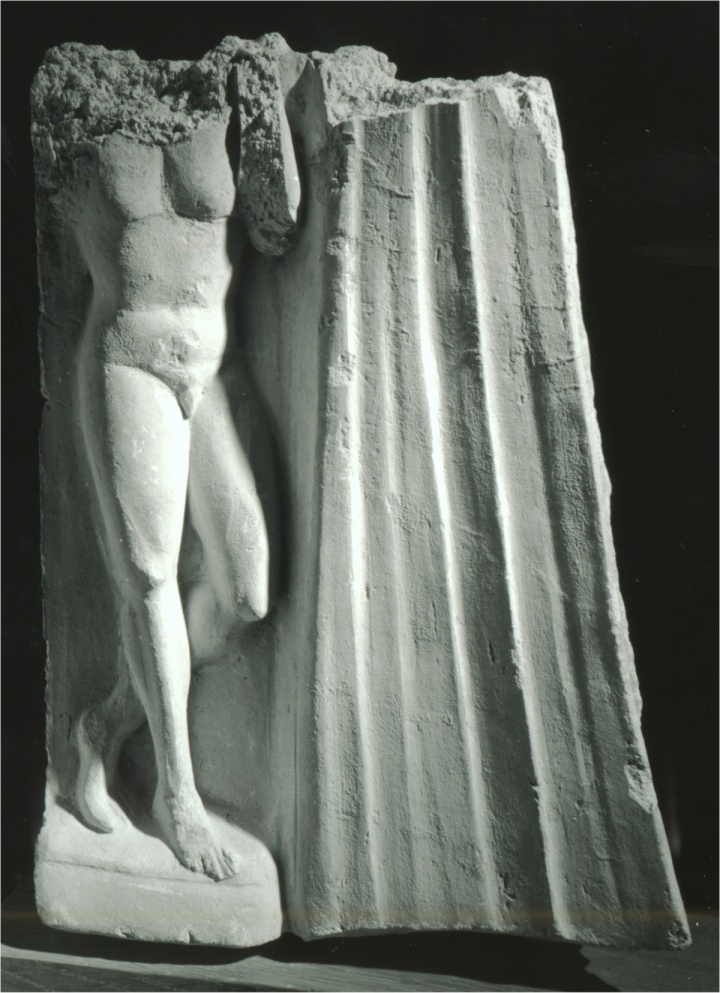
A sculpture from Hadda, (3rd century)

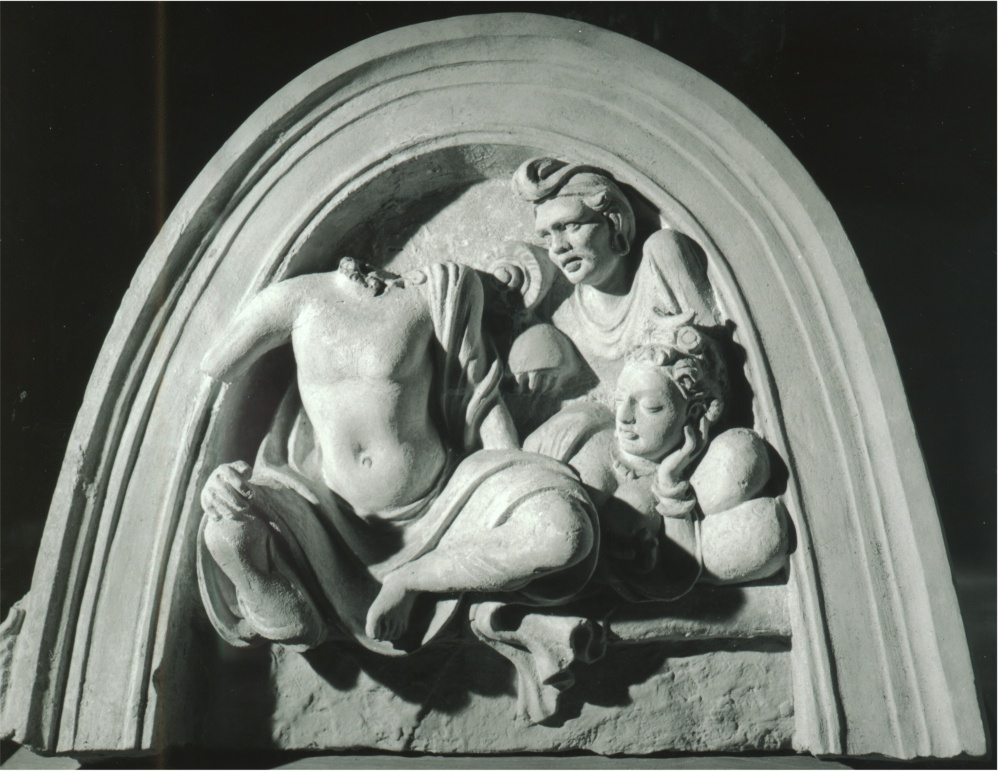
The Bodhisattva and Chandeka, Hadda (5th century)

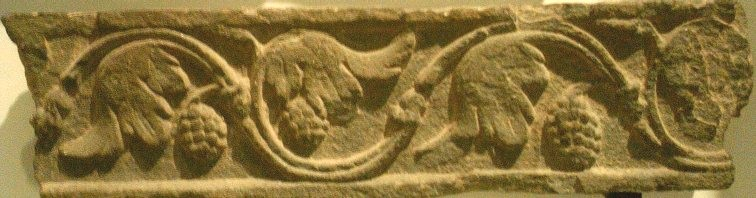
Hellenistic decorative scrolls from Hadda, Afghanistan

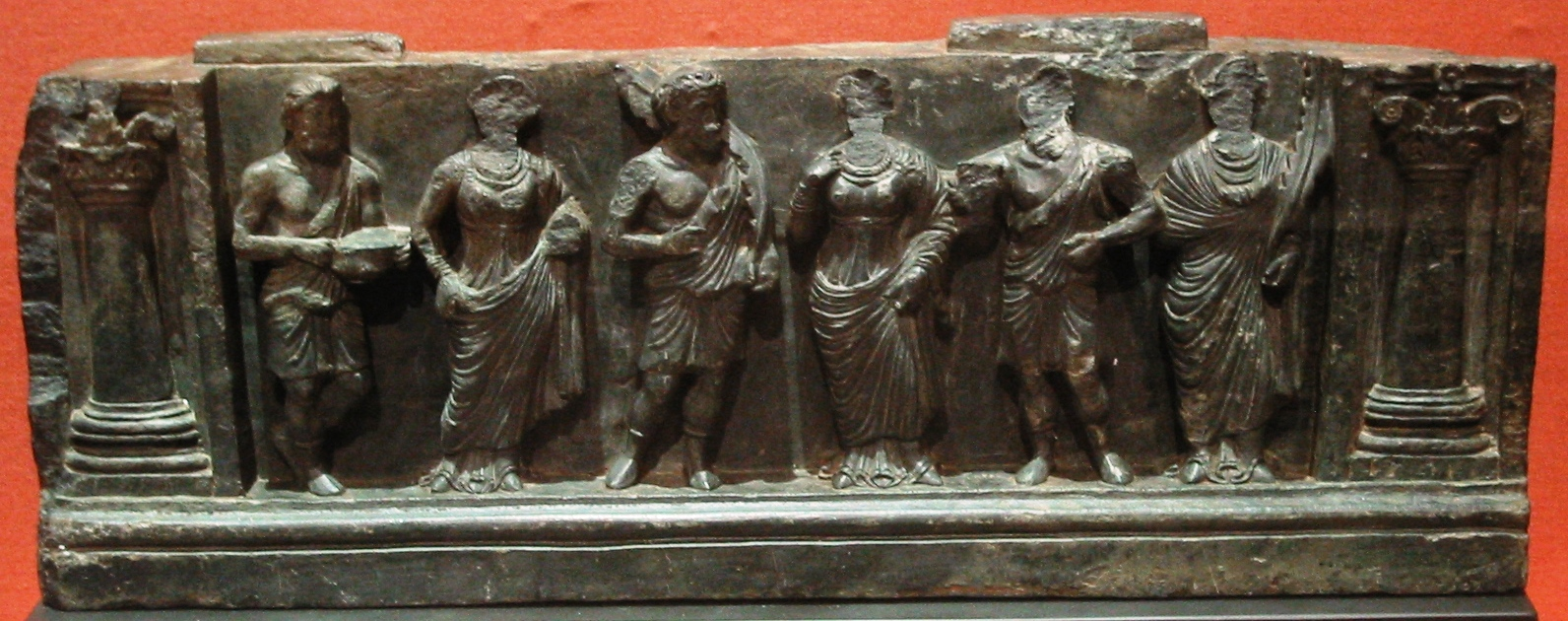
Hellenistic scene, Gandhara (1st century)

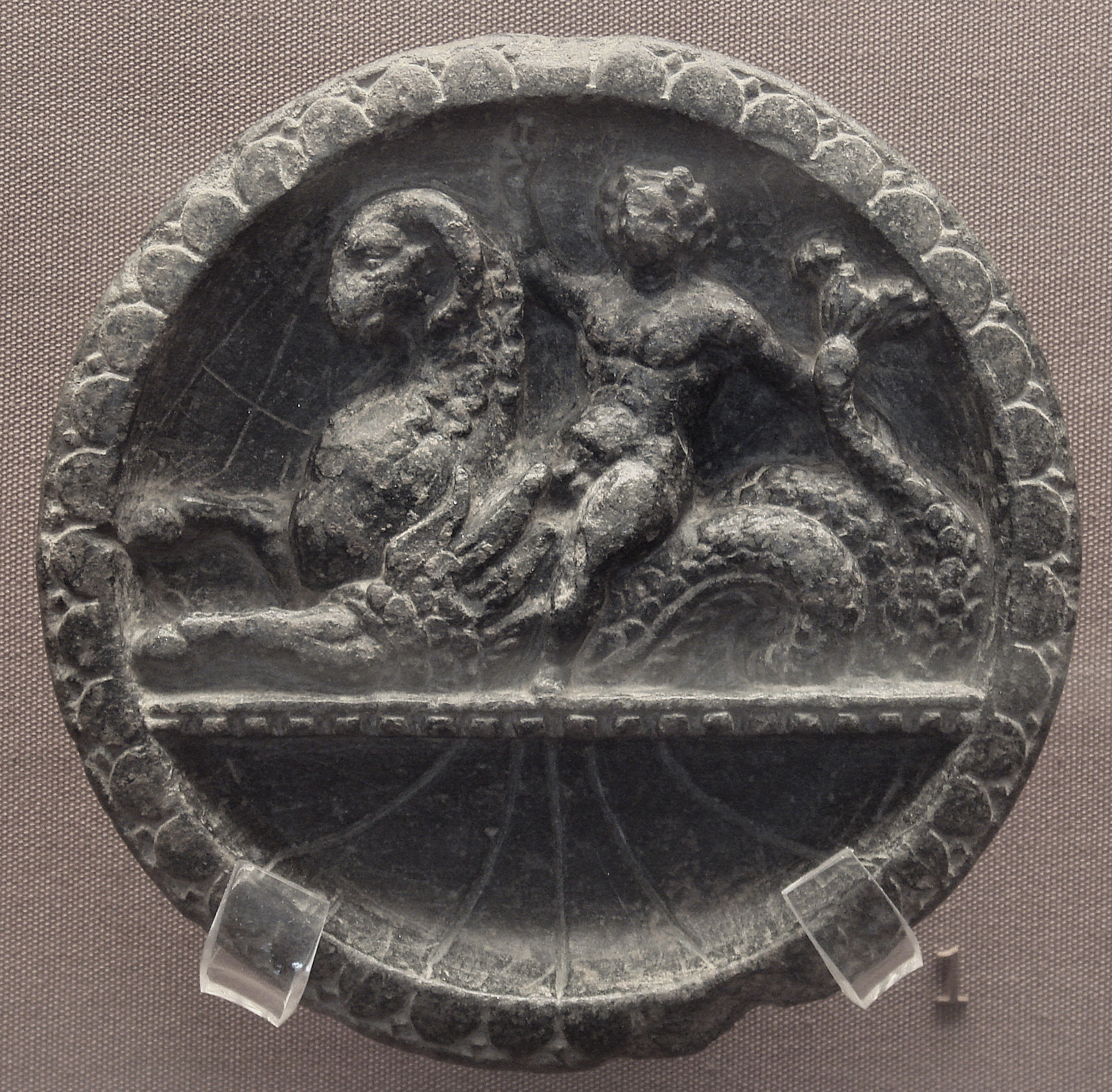
A stone plate (1st century)

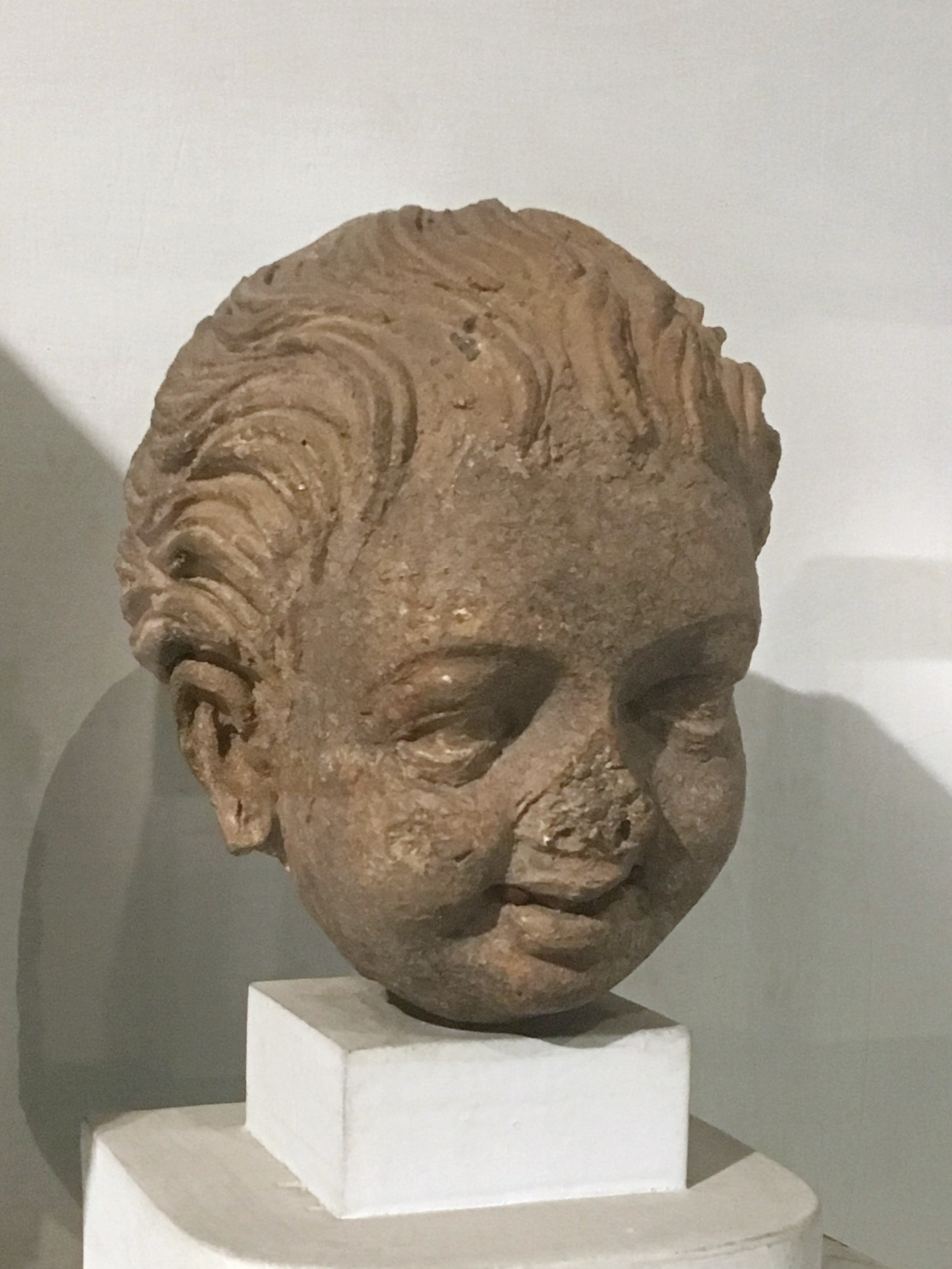
"Laughing boy" from Hadda

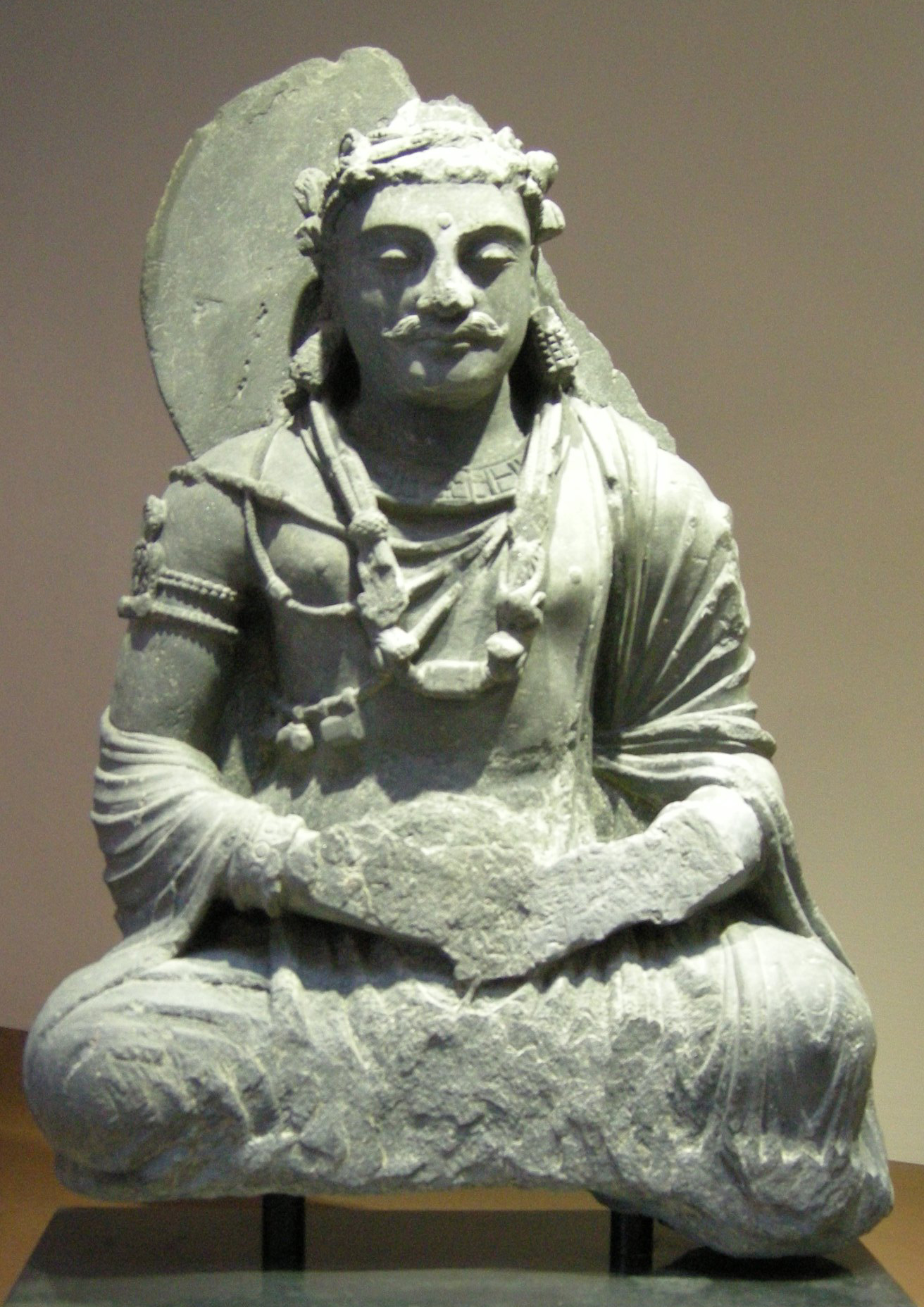
Bodhisattva seated in meditation

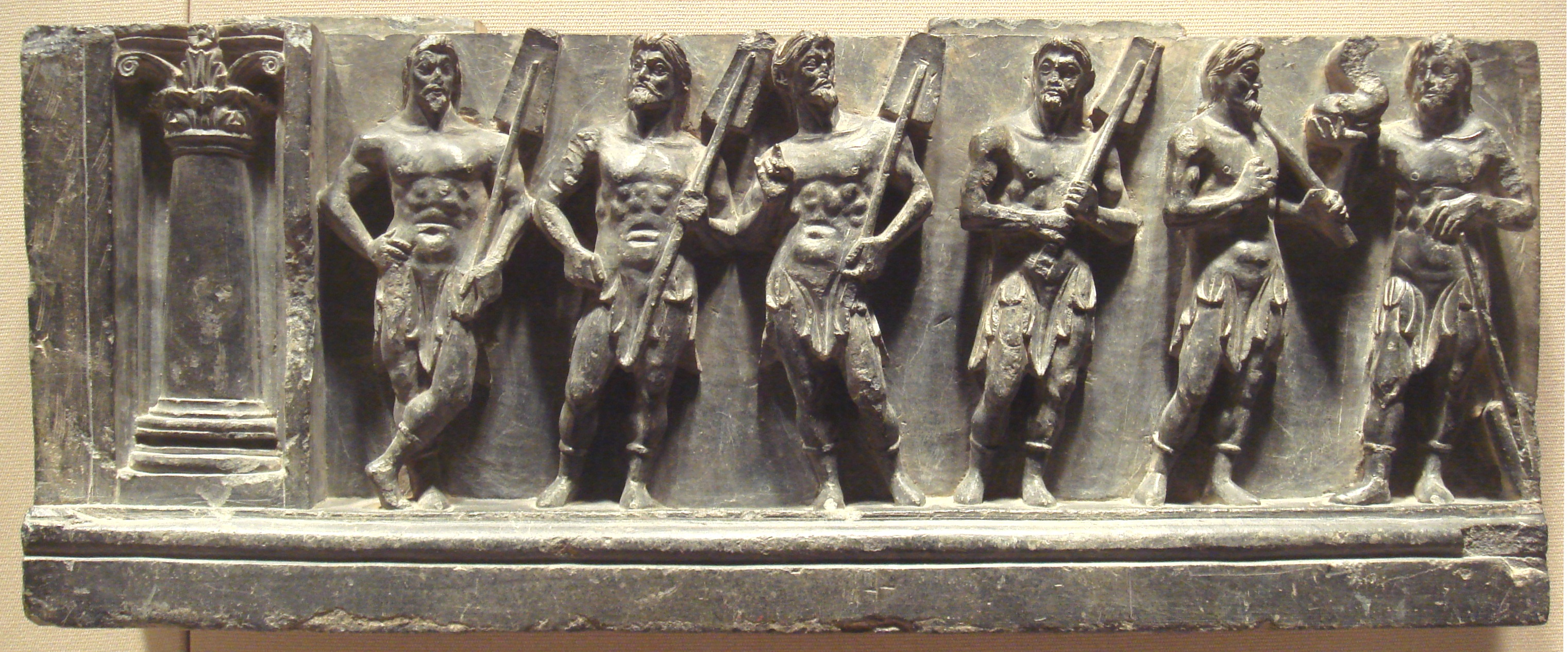
Marine deities, Gandhara

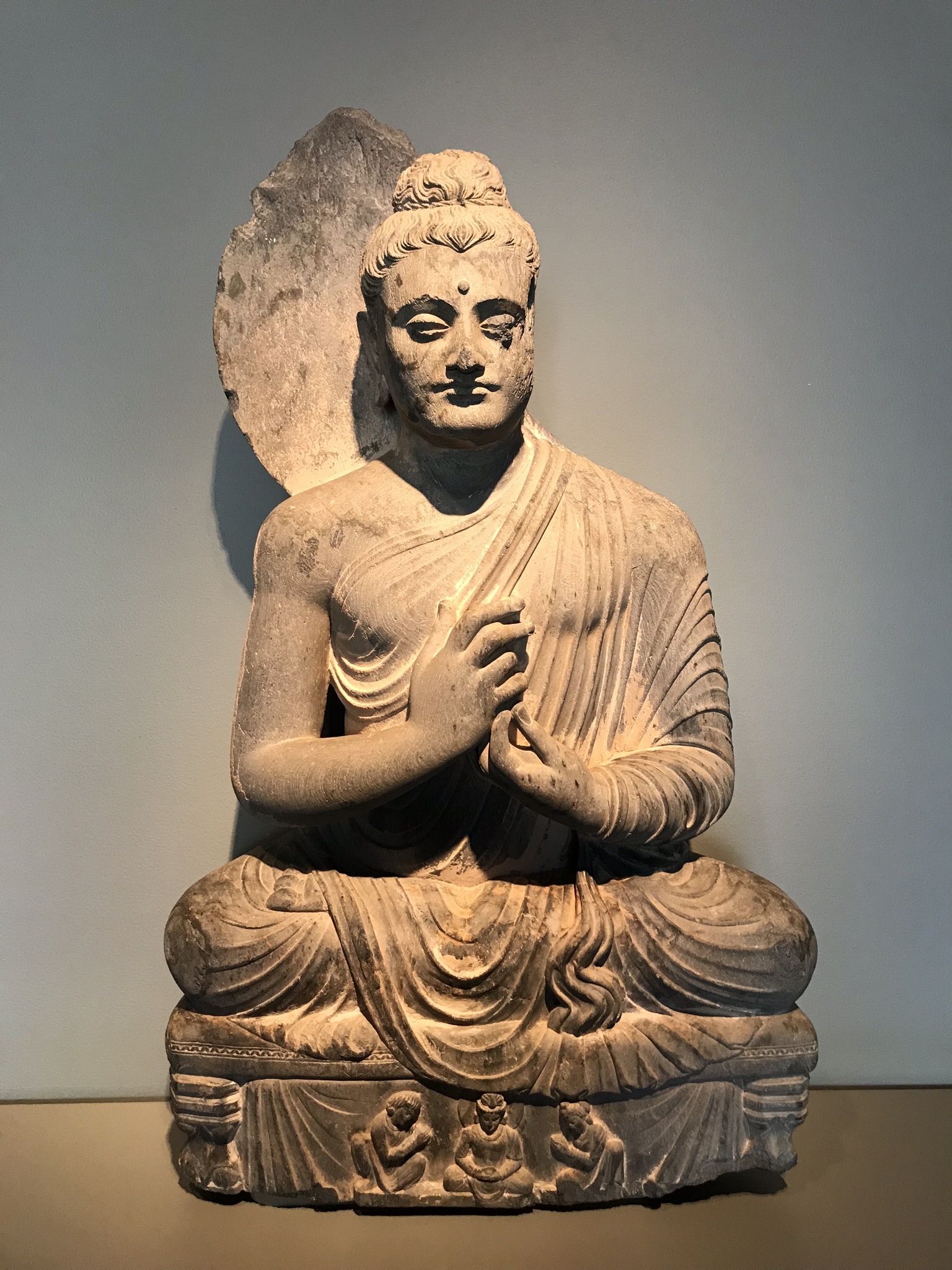
The Seated Buddha, dating from 300 to 500 CE, was found near Jamal Garhi, and is now on display at the Asian Art Museum in San Francisco.

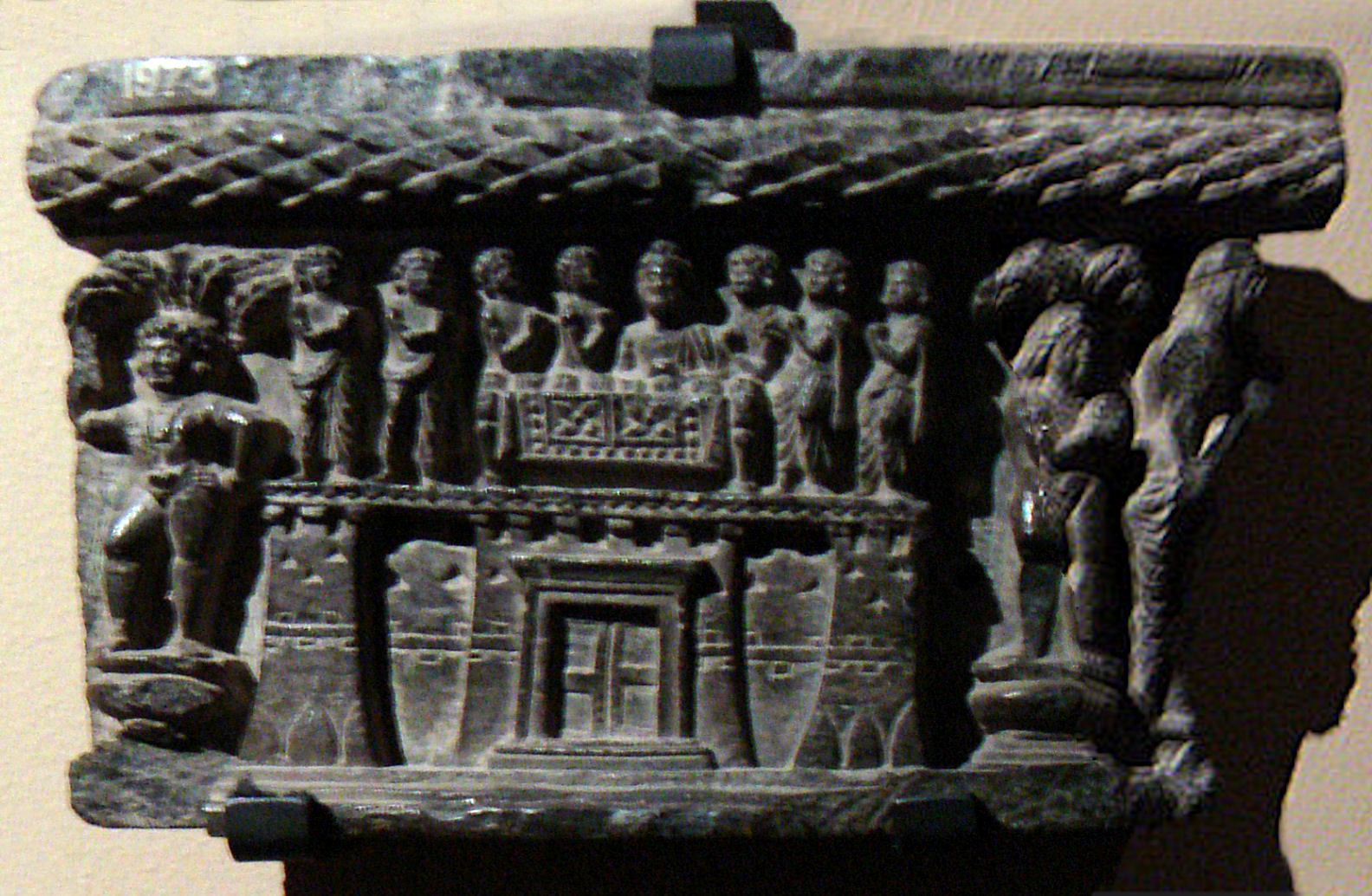
Sharing of the Buddha's relics, above a Gandhara fortified city

=== Rediscovery ===
By the time Gandhara had been absorbed into the Ghaznavid Empire (977–1186) of Mahmud of Ghazni, Buddhist buildings were already in ruins and Gandhara's art had been forgotten. After Al-Biruni, the Kashmiri writer Kalhaṇa wrote his book Rajatarangini in 1151. He recorded some events that took place in Gandhara and provided details about its last royal dynasty and capital Udabhandapura.

In the 19th century, British soldiers and administrators started taking an interest in the ancient history of the Indian subcontinent. In the 1830s coins of the post-Ashoka period were discovered, and in the same period, Chinese travelogues were translated. Charles Masson, James Prinsep, and Alexander Cunningham deciphered the Kharosthi script in 1838. Chinese records provided locations and site plans for Buddhist shrines. Along with the discovery of coins, these records provided clues necessary to piece together the history of Gandhara. In 1848 Cunningham found Gandhara sculptures north of Peshawar. He also identified the site of Taxila in the 1860s. From then on a large number of Buddhist statues were discovered in the Peshawar valley.

Archaeologist John Marshall excavated at Taxila between 1912 and 1934. He discovered separate Greek, Parthian, and Kushan cities and a large number of stupas and monasteries. These discoveries helped to piece together much more of the chronology of the history of Gandhara and its art.

After 1947 Ahmed Hassan Dani and the Archaeology Department at the University of Peshawar made several discoveries in the Peshawar and Swat Valley. Excavation of many of the sites of the Gandhara Civilisation is being done by researchers from Peshawar and several universities around the world.

== Major cities ==
Major cities of ancient Gandhara are as follows:

- Puṣkalavati (Charsadda), Pakistan
- Takshashila (Taxila), Pakistan
- Puruṣapura (Peshawer), Pakistan
- Oddiyana (Swat), Pakistan
- Chukhsa (Chhachh), Pakistan
- Udabhanda (Hund), Pakistan
- Aornos, Pakistan

== In popular culture ==
- Gandhara:Buddha no Seisen is an action RPG released in Japan in 1987.
- "Gandhara" is a 1978 song by Japanese rock band Godiego, serving as their 7th single.
- Gandhara is a fictional Buddhist pacifist organisation in the Japanese manga series Shaman King.

== See also ==
- History of Pakistan
- History of Punjab
- Apracharajas
- History of Afghanistan

== Sources ==
- Beal, Samuel. 1884. Si-Yu-Ki: Buddhist Records of the Western World, by Hiuen Tsiang. 2 vols. Trans. by Samuel Beal. London. Reprint: Delhi. Oriental Books Reprint Corporation. 1969.
- Beal, Samuel. 1911. The Life of Hiuen-Tsiang by the Shaman Hwui Li, with an Introduction containing an account of the Works of I-Tsing. Trans. by Samuel Beal. London. 1911. Reprint: Munshiram Manoharlal, New Delhi. 1973.
- Behrendt, Kurt A. (2007). The Art of Gandhara in the Metropolitan Museum of Art. Metropolitan Museum of Art.
- Bellew, H.W. Kashmir and Kashgar. London, 1875. Reprint: Sang-e-Meel Publications 1999 ISBN 969-35-0738-X
- Bryant, Edwin Francis (2002). The Quest for the Origins of Vedic Culture: The Indo-Aryan Migration Debate. Oxford University Press. ISBN 978-0-19-565361-8.
- Eggermont, Pierre Herman Leonard (1975), Alexander's Campaigns in Sind and Baluchistan and the Siege of the Brahmin Town of Harmatelia, Peeters Publishers, ISBN 978-90-6186-037-2
- Dani, A.H.; Bernard, P. (1994). "Alexander and His Successors in Central Asia". In Harmatta, Janos (ed.). History Of Civilizations Of Central Asia, Volume 2. Unesco Publishing.
- Ellerbrock, Uwe (2021). The Parthians: The Forgotten Empire. Routledge.
- Hansen, Mogens Herman (2000). A Comparative Study of Thirty City-state Cultures: An Investigation. Kgl. Danske Videnskabernes Selskab. ISBN 978-87-7876-177-4.
- Herodotus (1920). Histories (in Greek and English). With an English translation by A. D. Godley. Cambridge: Harvard University Press.
- Hill, John E. 2003. "Annotated Translation of the Chapter on the Western Regions according to the Hou Hanshu". 2nd Edition: Through the Jade Gate to Rome: A Study of the Silk Routes, 1st to 2nd centuries CE. 2015. John E. Hill. Volume I, ISBN 978-1500696702; Volume II, ISBN 978-1503384620. CreateSpace, North Charleston, S.C.
- Hussain, J. An Illustrated History of Pakistan, Oxford University Press, Karachi, 1983.
- "Imperial Gazetteer2 of India, Volume 19– Imperial Gazetteer of India". Digital South Asia Library.
- Jamil, Ansar (2017). "Central Asia's Quest for Warm Waters: From the Caspian Sea to Gwadar Port". Strategic Studies, Vol. 37, No. 3 (Autumn 2017), pp. 92-111.
- Kulke, Hermann; Rothermund, Dietmar (2004). A History of India. Psychology Press. ISBN 978-0-415-32919-4.
- Legge, James. Trans. and ed. 1886. A Record of Buddhistic Kingdoms: being an account by the Chinese monk Fâ-hsien of his travels in India and Ceylon (A.D. 399–414) in search of the Buddhist Books of Discipline. Reprint: Dover Publications, New York. 1965.
- Narasimhan, Vagheesh M.; Patterson, N. J.; Moorjani, Priya; Rohland, Nadin; et al. (2019). "The Formation of Human Populations in South and Central Asia". Science. 365 (6457) eaat7487. Bibcode:2019Sci...365t7487N. doi:10.1126/science.aat7487. PMC 6822619. PMID 31488661.
- Neelis, Jason (2010). Early Buddhist Transmission and Trade Networks: Mobility and Exchange Within and Beyond the Northwestern Borderlands of South Asia. BRILL. ISBN 978-90-04-18159-5.
- Pizarro, Daniela (2025). An Inquiry into Non-Buddhist Religious Elements in Gandhāra from the 3rd BCE to the 3rd century CE (PDF). University of Sydney.
- Olbrycht, Marek Jan (2016). "Dynastic Connections in the Arsacid Empire and the Origins of the House of Sāsān". In Curtis, Vesta Sarkhosh; Pendleton, Elizabeth J.; Alram, Michael; Daryaee, Touraj (eds.). The Parthian and Early Sasanian Empires: Adaptation and Expansion. Oxbow Books. ISBN 9781785702082.
- Olivieri, Luca M.; Micheli, Roberto; Vidale, Massimo; Zahir, Muhammad (2019). "S2.4.1 Late Bronze - Iron Age Swat Protohistoric Graves (Gandhara Grave Culture), Swat Valley, Pakistan (n-99)" in Narasimhan, Vagheesh M.; et al. (2019). "Supplementary Materials for the formation of human populations in South and Central Asia" (PDF). Science. 365 (6457). Bibcode:2019Sci...365t7487N. doi:10.1126/science.aat7487. PMC 6822619. PMID 31488661.
- Raychaudhuri, Hemchandra (1953). Political History of Ancient India: From the Accession of Parikshit to the Extinction of Gupta Dynasty. University of Calcutta.
- Rehman, Abdur (January 1976). The Last Two Dynasties of the Sahis: An analysis of their history, archaeology, coinage and palaeography (Thesis). Australian National University.
- Rezakhani, Khodadad (2017). ReOrienting the Sasanians: East Iran in Late Antiquity. Edinburgh University Press. pp. 1–256. ISBN 9781474400305.
- Samad, Rafi U. (2011). The Grandeur of Gandhara: The Ancient Buddhist Civilization of the Swat, Peshawar, Kabul and Indus Valleys. Algora Publishing.
- Sen, Sailendra Nath (1999). Ancient Indian History and Civilization. New Age International. ISBN 9788122411980.
- Shaw, Isobel. Pakistan Handbook, The Guidebook Co., Hong Kong, 1989
- Watters, Thomas. 1904–5. On Yuan Chwang's Travels in India (A.D. 629–645). Reprint: Mushiram Manoharlal Publishers, New Delhi. 1973.

Timeline and cultural period	Indus plain (Punjab-Sapta Sindhu-Gujarat)	Gangetic Plain			Central India	Southern India
Timeline and cultural period	Indus plain (Punjab-Sapta Sindhu-Gujarat)	Upper Gangetic Plain (Ganga-Yamuna doab)	Middle Gangetic Plain	Lower Gangetic Plain	Central India	Southern India
IRON AGE
Culture	Late Vedic Period	Late Vedic Period; Painted Grey Ware culture	Late Vedic Period; Northern Black Polished Ware		Pre-history	
6th century BCE	Gandhara	Kuru-Panchala	Magadha		Adivasi (tribes)	Assaka
Culture	Persian-Greek influences	"Second Urbanisation"; Rise of Shramana movements Jainism - Buddhism - Ājīvika - Yoga			Pre-history	
5th century BCE	(Persian conquests)		Shaishunaga dynasty		Adivasi (tribes)	Assaka
4th century BCE	(Greek conquests)	Nanda empire				
HISTORICAL AGE
Culture	Spread of Buddhism				Pre-history	
3rd century BCE	Maurya Empire					Satavahana dynasty Sangam period (300 BCE – 200 CE); Early Cholas; Early Pandyan kingdom Cheras
Culture	Preclassical Hinduism (Note: Michaels (2004) p.39) - "Hindu Synthesis" (Note: Hiltebeitel (2002)) (ca. 200 BCE - 300 CE) (Note: Michaels (2004) p.39) (Note: Hiltebeitel (2002)); Epics - Puranas - Ramayana - Mahabharata - Bhagavad Gita - Brahma Sutras - Smarta Tradition; Mahayana Buddhism					
2nd century BCE	Indo-Greek Kingdom		Shunga Empire; Maha-Meghavahana Dynasty			Satavahana dynasty Sangam period (300 BCE – 200 CE); Early Cholas; Early Pandyan kingdom Cheras
1st century BCE	Indo-Greek Kingdom		Shunga Empire; Maha-Meghavahana Dynasty			Satavahana dynasty Sangam period (300 BCE – 200 CE); Early Cholas; Early Pandyan kingdom Cheras
1st century CE	Indo-Scythians; Indo-Parthians		Kuninda Kingdom			Satavahana dynasty Sangam period (300 BCE – 200 CE); Early Cholas; Early Pandyan kingdom Cheras
2nd century	Kushan Empire					Satavahana dynasty Sangam period (300 BCE – 200 CE); Early Cholas; Early Pandyan kingdom Cheras
3rd century	Kushano-Sasanian Kingdom; Western Satraps	Kushan Empire		Kamarupa kingdom	Adivasi (tribes)	Satavahana dynasty Sangam period (300 BCE – 200 CE); Early Cholas; Early Pandyan kingdom Cheras
Culture	"Golden Age of Hinduism"(ca. CE 320-650) (Note: Michaels (2004) p.40); Puranas - Kural; Co-existence of Hinduism and Buddhism					
4th century	Kidarites	Gupta Empire; Varman dynasty				Andhra Ikshvakus; Kalabhra dynasty Kadamba Dynasty; Western Ganga Dynasty
5th century	Hephthalite Empire	Alchon Huns				Vishnukundina; Kalabhra dynasty
6th century	Nezak Huns; Kabul Shahi; Maitraka				Adivasi (tribes)	Vishnukundina; Badami Chalukyas; Kalabhra dynasty
Culture	Late-Classical Hinduism (ca. CE 650-1100) (Note: Michaels (2004) p.41); Advaita Vedanta - Tantra; Decline of Buddhism in India					
7th century	Indo-Sassanids		Vakataka dynasty Empire of Harsha	Mlechchha dynasty	Adivasi (tribes)	Badami Chalukyas; Eastern Chalukyas; Pandyan kingdom (revival); Pallava
7th century	Karkota dynasty				Adivasi (tribes)	
8th century	Kabul Shahi	Pala Empire			Adivasi (tribes)	Eastern Chalukyas; Pandyan kingdom Kalachuri
9th century	Gurjara-Pratihara				Adivasi (tribes)	Rashtrakuta Empire; Eastern Chalukyas; Pandyan kingdom Medieval Cholas; Chera Perumals of Makkotai
10th century	Ghaznavids			Pala dynasty Kamboja-Pala dynasty	Adivasi (tribes)	Kalyani Chalukyas; Eastern Chalukyas; Medieval Cholas; Chera Perumals of Makkotai; Rashtrakuta
References and sources for table References Sources: Flood, Gavin D. (1996), An Introduction to Hinduism, Cambridge University Press; Hiltebeitel, Alf (2002), Hinduism. In: Joseph Kitagawa, "The Religious Traditions of Asia: Religion, History, and Culture", Routledge; Michaels, Axel (2004), Hinduism. Past and present, Princeton, New Jersey: Princeton University Press
