= Atari (disambiguation) =

Atari is a video game brand and computer brand.

Atari may also refer to:

== Companies ==
- Atari, Inc. (1972–1984), the defunct original corporation co-founded by Nolan Bushnell and Ted Dabney
- Atari Corporation (1984–1996), the defunct corporation formed by Jack Tramiel from the original Atari Inc.'s Consumer Division assets
- Atari Games (1984–2003), the coin-operated game company spun off from the original Atari Inc.'s Coin-Op division
- Atari SA (2009–present), the former Infogrames Entertainment, SA, a French holding company who owns and runs the current Atari branded divisions
- Atari, Inc. (2003–present), the US division of Atari, SA
- Atari Interactive, the current holding company of the Atari brand and a division of Atari, SA
- Atari Inc. (2002–2013), the Japanese slot machine company that was merged into Natsume Atari.

== Places ==
- Atari, Pakistan, a town in Pakistan.
- Atari, Ādaži Municipality, a village in Latvia
- Atari, Nawanshahr, a village in Punjab, India
- Atrai Upazila, Rajshahi, Bangladesh
- Attari, a village in Punjab, India, near the border crossing with Pakistan
  - Attari (Assembly Constituency), electoral constituency in the state legislative assembly
  - Atari Shyam Singh railway station
  - Sham Singh Attariwala, warrior during First Anglo Sikh War

== Other uses ==
- Atari (当たり), a Japanese word used in the game of Go
- Atari (Jakks Pacific), two plug-and-play video-game consoles featuring Atari games
- The Ataris, an alternative rock band
- Atari Teenage Riot, a punk/techno band
- Atari, abbreviation of Finnish registry term "ammatti- ja taparikollinen" ("professional and habitual criminal") used by Finnish police
- Atari (name)
- Atari Democrat a political term used in the United States during the 80s and 90s
- Atari 2600, sometimes simply just called Atari
- aṯarī (أثري), an Islamic traditionalist theology
- "Atari" (12 Monkeys), a 2015 television episode

== See also ==
- Attari, a town in Punjab, India
  - Attari (Assembly Constituency)
  - Attari–Wagah border ceremony, a military ceremony on the India-Pakistan border
- Atar (disambiguation)
- Attar (disambiguation)
- Atrai (disambiguation)
- Athar (disambiguation)
- Athari, Sunni Islamic theological school
- Athari (surname)
