= Sal Khurd =

- Village
- Location in Punjab, India Sal Khurd (India)
- Coordinates: 31.2262197°N 75.9572703°E
- Country: India
- State: Punjab
- District: Shaheed Bhagat Singh Nagar

Government
  - Type: Panchayat raj
  - Body: Gram panchayat
- Elevation: 251 m (823 ft)

Population (2011)
  - Total: 405
- Sex ratio 207/198 ♂/♀

Languages
  - Official: Punjabi
- Time zone: UTC+5:30 (IST)
- PIN: 144505
- Telephone code: 01884
- ISO 3166 code: IN-PB
- Post office: Jandiala (B.O)
- Website: nawanshahr.nic.in

Sal Khurd is a village in Shaheed Bhagat Singh Nagar district of Punjab State, India. It is located 1 kilometre (0.62 mi) away from branch post office Jandiala, 20 kilometres (12 mi) from Nawanshahr, 18 kilometres (11 mi) from district headquarter Shaheed Bhagat Singh Nagar and 110 kilometres (68 mi) from state capital Chandigarh. The village is administrated by Sarpanch an elected representative of the village.

== Demography ==
As of 2011, Sal Khurd has a total number of 84 houses and population of 405 of which 207 include are males while 198 are females according to the report published by Census India in 2011. The literacy rate of Sal Khurd is 79.96% higher than the state average of 75.84%. The population of children under the age of 6 years is 56 which is 13.83% of total population of Sal Khurd, and child sex ratio is approximately 750 as compared to Punjab state average of 846.

Most of the people are from Schedule Caste which constitutes 77.78% of total population in Sal Khurd. The town does not have any Schedule Tribe population so far.

As per the report published by Census India in 2011, 138 people were engaged in work activities out of the total population of Sal Khurd which includes 117 males and 21 females. According to census survey report 2011, 47.83% workers describe their work as main work and 52.17% workers are involved in Marginal activity providing livelihood for less than 6 months.

== Education ==
The village has no school and children either travel or walk to other villages for schooling often covering 8 to 10 kilometres (5.0 to 6.2 mi). Amardeep Singh Shergill Memorial college Mukandpur, KC Engineering College and Doaba Khalsa Trust Group Of Institutions are the nearest colleges. Industrial Training Institute for women (ITI Nawanshahr) is 21 kilometres (13 mi). The village is 91.5 kilometres (56.9 mi) away from Chandigarh University, 68 kilometres (42 mi) from Indian Institute of Technology and 31 kilometres (19 mi) away from Lovely Professional University.

List of schools nearby

- Govt Primary School, Sal Kalan
- Govt Primary School, Atari
- Govt Upper Primary School, Heon
- Govt Upper Primary School, Jandiala

== Transport ==
Banga train station is the nearest train station however, Garhshankar Junction railway station is 23 kilometres (14 mi) away from the village. Sahnewal Airport is the nearest domestic airport which located 73 kilometres (45 mi) away in Ludhiana and the nearest international airport is located in Chandigarh also Sri Guru Ram Dass Jee International Airport is the second nearest airport which is 140 kilometres (87 mi) away in Amritsar.

== See also ==
- List of villages in India
