= Athar =

Athar may refer to:

== Given name ==
- Athar Abbas (born 1955), Pakistani ambassador
- Athar Ali, multiple people
- Athar Ali Bengali (1891–1976), politician
- Athar-Ali Fyzee (1883–1963), Indian tennis and table tennis player
- Athar El-Hakim (born 1957), Egyptian actress
- Athar Shah Khan Jaidi (1943–2020), Pakistani comedian, poet, and writer
- Athar Ali Khan (born 1962), Bangladeshi cricket commentator and former cricketer
- Athar Ali Khan (politician), Pakistani politician
- Athar Laeeq (born 1971), Pakistani cricketer
- Athar Mahboob (born 1971), Pakistani academic and electrical engineer
- Athar Mahmood (1952–2013), Pakistani diplomat
- Athar Mahmood (cricketer) (born 1999), Pakistani cricketer
- Athar Minallah (born 1961), Pakistani lawyer and jurist
- Athar Mohammed (1859–1931), Odia military officer
- Athar Tahir (born 1956), Pakistani civil servant
- Athar Zaidi (1946–2012), Pakistani cricketer
- Athar Almair Dzamil (born 2013), Formula 1, Fernando Alonso's partner

== Surname ==
- Faisal Athar (born 1975), Pakistani cricketer
- Sohaib Athar, Pakistani computer scientist

== Other ==
- Hadith, Islamic historical accounts about Muhammad, alternately called Athar in Arabic language, meaning tradition
- Athar (Planescape), a faction of Sigil in the Planescape campaign setting
- Attar or athar, an essential oil used as perfumes
- Antiquities Trafficking and Heritage Anthropology Research Project (ATHAR)

== See also ==
- Attar (disambiguation)
- Atar (disambiguation)
- Atari (disambiguation)
- Athari, Sunni Islamic theological school
- Athari (surname)
