= Agalasseis =

Indian tribe defeated by Alexander the Great

The Agalasseis (Note: Diodorus uses the name Agalasseis for this tribe; V.A. Smith wrongly transcribed the name as Agalassoi, a spelling followed by some other scholars relying on him; some scholars transcribe the name as Agalassians. Justin calls them Agensones.) were an Indian tribe mentioned in Greco-Roman accounts as an opponent of Alexander the Great. Their territory was located in the lower Indus Valley, in the Punjab region of present-day Pakistan. They strongly resisted Alexander's invasion before suffering a defeat.

== Greco-Roman accounts ==
According to Diodorus (1st century BCE), during his invasion of India, Alexander made a pact of friendship with the Siboi (or Sibians), the neighbors of the Agalasseis. Alexander then marched against the Agalasseis, whose army comprised 40,000 infantry and a 3,000 cavalry. He defeated them, "cutting down" most of them. The survivors fled to the nearby cities, but Alexander besieged those cities, captured them, and sold them as slaves. In one such city, 20,000 people including "other natives" had taken refuge: the defenders barricaded the streets and fought from their houses. Alexander besieged the city, and lost several of his soldiers in the conflict. In anger, he set fire to the city, burning up most of the residents. Around 3,000 defenders surrendered to him and appealed for mercy: Alexander pardoned them.

Quintus Curtius (1st century CE) refers to an unnamed tribe that can be identified with the Agalasseis; he simply calls them alia gens ("another nation"). Curtius locates this tribe next to the Siboi (or Sibi), but unlike Diodorus, he states that Alexander routed the Siboi. According to Curtius, the Agalasseis initially repulsed Alexander's invasion, but Alexander continued the siege despite losing many soldiers, and ultimately overpowered the defenders. Facing a certain defeat, the Agalasseis soldiers set their houses on fire, and immolated themselves along with their wives and children in the fire. Curtius adds that Alexander's army tried to douse the fire, and managed to save the citadel, where Alexander left behind a garrison.

Historian Ramashankar Tripathi considers the Agalasseis' act of self-immolation as a precursor of the medieval concept of jauhar. Academic Jan Stronk notes that while Diodorus attributes the fire to Alexander's army, Curtius states that the Indians themselves set their city on fire. Stronk suggests that Curtius probably confused this city with another city mentioned by Arrian. According to Arrian, this city belonged to the Brahmin (Brahcman) tribe ruled by king Sambus.

Pliny (1st century CE), in his Natural History, mentions some tribes located beyond the territory of the Modogalinga tribe. The names of these tribes vary among the manuscripts (e.g. "Modressae-Praeti-Aclissae" and "Modressepi-Caloe"), but P. H. L. Eggermont decodes these as Madra, Sepi, and Aclissae or Caloe. He identifies Sepi with the Shibi, and based on this, Aclissae with their neighbours - the Agalasseis.

Justin (2nd century CE) mentions that Alexander sailed along the Acesines (Chenab) river, where the Agensonae and Sibi (Shibi) tribes surrendered to him. This description suggests that Agensonae were same as the Agalasseis. According to Eggermont, the tribe was probably named after the Acesines river, with the Greeco-Roman writers variously calling them Accensonae, Acensanae, Agesinae, and Ageni.

== Identification ==
The identity of the Agalasseis and the exact location of their territory is uncertain. The Greco-Roman accounts suggest that the Agalasseis lived in the neighbourhood of the Siboi tribe, identified with the ancient Shivi janapada. The Agalasseis certainly lived above the confluence of the Acesines (Chenab) and the Indus rivers, north of the Mallians. Curtius mentions that the "three largest rivers in India washed the line of the fortifications" of the Agalasseis stronghold: the Indus flowed near it, and the confluence of the Acesines and the Hydaspes was located to its south.

English orientalist Lionel Barnett identifies the Agalasseis with Aggaḷas or residents of the Aggacha janapada, whose territory is identified as the area around Agroha. Academic Bela Lahiri doubts this, noting that the territory of the neighboring Siboi (the Shibis) was located around the present-day Jhang District, which is not adjacent to Agroha. Numismatist P. L. Gupta supports Barnett's identification, arguing that after their defeat against Alexander, the Agalasseis may have moved to the area around Agroha.

According to Ramashankar Tripathi, the term Agalasseis may be a Greek transcription of the Sanskrit name "Agraśreṇi".
