= Heon =

Heon may refer to:

== People ==
- Georges Héon (1902–1965), Canadian politician
- Jo Heon (1544–1592), Korean militia leader
- Sue Heon (born 1962), American swimmer

== Fictional characters ==
- Jo Heon, head of an investigation team in the 2024 South Korean TV series Vigilante

== Places ==
- Heon, SBS Nagar, India

== Korean names ==
- Heon (Korean: 헌) can appear in Korean names:
