= Mallian campaign =

Battle involving Alexander the Great

- Part of the Indian campaign of Alexander the Great
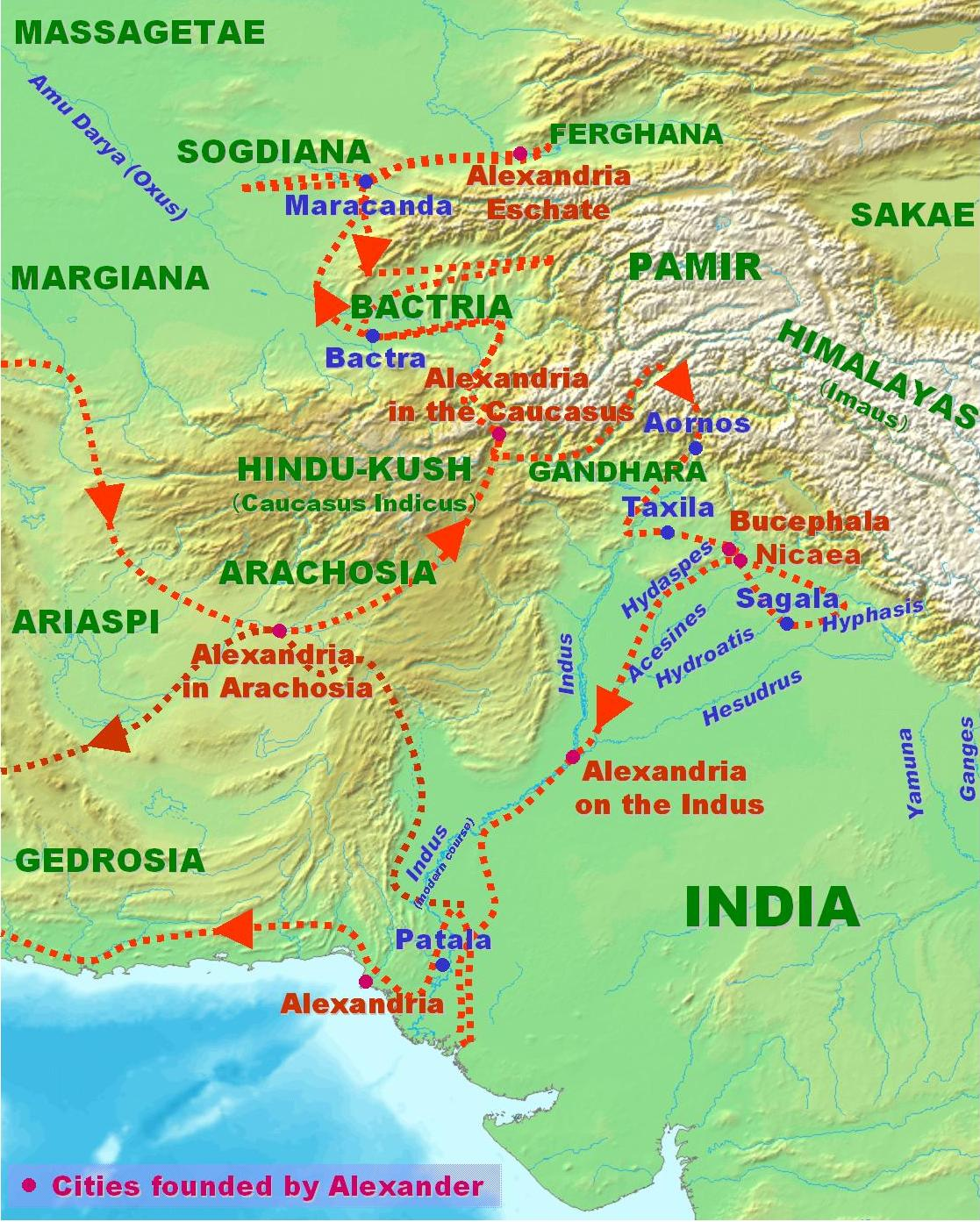
- Alexander's Indian conquests, with the Mallian campaign at the confluence of the Hydraotis and the Hydaspes
Date	November 326 – February 325 BC
Location	Punjab region 30°42′N 72°18′E
Result	Macedonian victory

Belligerents
Macedon; League of Corinth	Mallians

Commanders and leaders
Alexander the Great (WIA); Hephaestion; Peithon; Craterus	Various
- Location within South Asia

Alexander the Great
current battle

The Mallian campaign was conducted by Alexander the Great from November 326 to February 325 BC, against the Mallians of the Punjab. Alexander was defining the eastern limit of his power by marching down-river along the Hydaspes to the Acesines (now the Jhelum and Chenab), but the Malli and the Oxydraci combined to refuse passage through their territory. Alexander sought to prevent their forces meeting, and made a swift campaign against them which successfully pacified the region between the two rivers. Alexander was seriously injured during the course of the campaign, almost losing his life.

== Background ==
The campaign against the Malli (identified with the Malavas) occurred a year after Alexander crossed the Hindu Kush, and eight years after the start of his campaigns against the Persian Empire. At this time, his conquests stretched from Greece into India; some of the Indian tribes had previously been part of the Persian Empire. The political situation in Greece was quiet.

Alexander had defeated King Porus at the Battle of the Hydaspes in May 326 BC, and then stayed in his territory for thirty days. During this time, he reconciled King Porus and his other ally, Taxiles, with each other, as they were both to be his new vassals. Alexander achieved this by arbitrating their disputes and then arranging a family alliance. He then marched north-east toward the Glaukanokoi, and received the submission of their thirty-seven cities. Abisares of Kashimir submitted to the Macedonians as well, and gave them many gifts, including forty elephants. Alexander proposed to march further east to the River Ganges and fight the powerful empires of the Nanda and the Gangaridai. According to the second century Greek historian Arrian, he expressed his thoughts thus:

Now if anyone desires to hear where our warfare will find its end and limit, let him know that the distance from where we are to the river Ganges is no longer great; and this you will find is connected to the Hyrcanian sea; for the great sea surrounds the entire earth. I will also demonstrate to the Macedonians and their allies not only that the Indian gulf is confluent with the Persian, but the Hycranian gulf is confluent with the Indian.

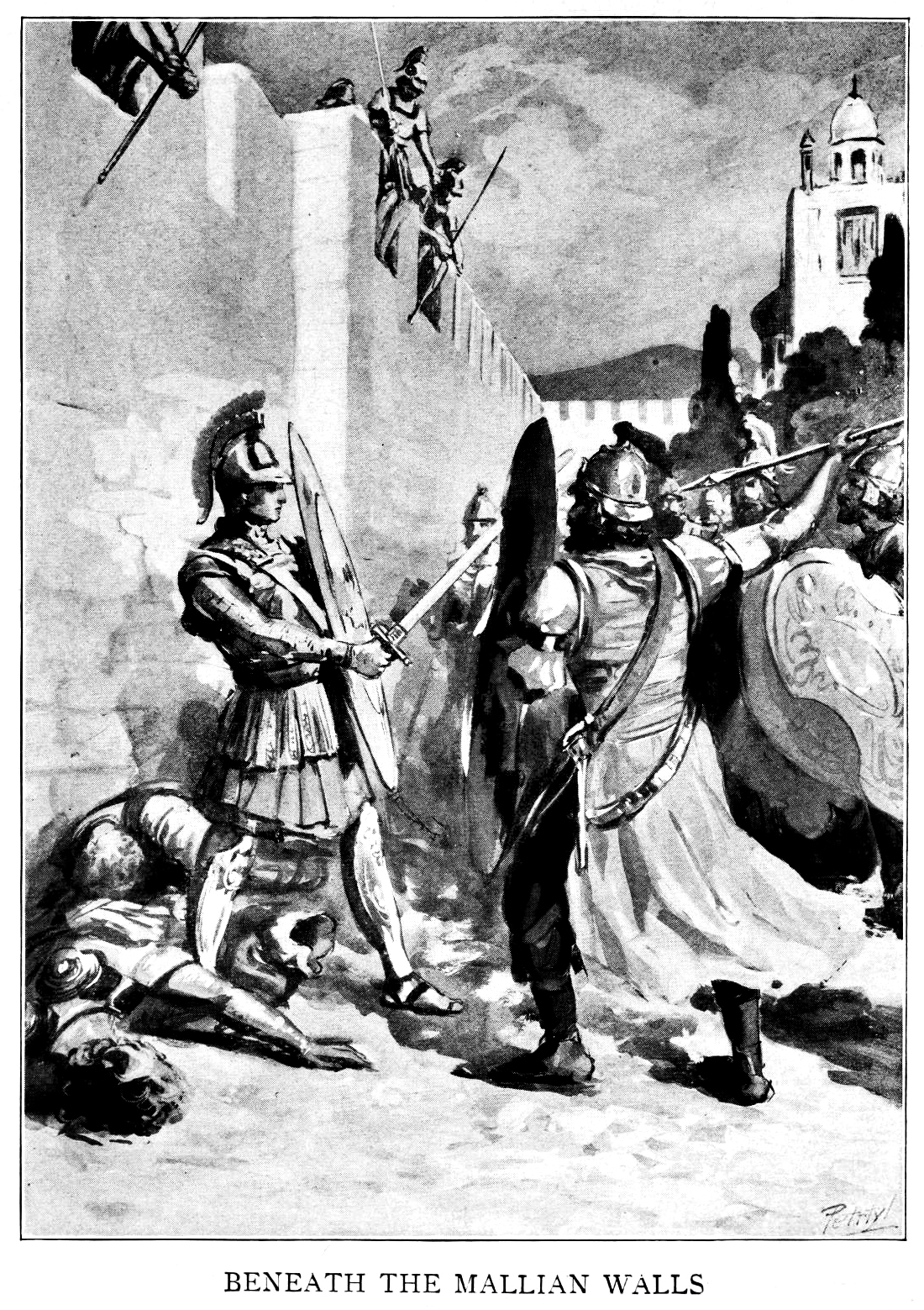
Alexander the Great beneath the Mallian walls

At the Beas River, his army mutinied. They did not share his ambition and wished to return home. It had been raining for the last seventy days. At the Battle of Hydaspes they had suffered many casualties. The Nanda Empire was rumoured to be even more powerful than Porus, who was only a princeling. Coenus' spoke on behalf of the troops and pleaded with Alexander to allow them to return, to the agreement of the other officers. Alexander finally gave in.

Shortly after this, Memnon brought up reinforcements of 6,000 cavalry from Thrace, and 7,000 infantry. The reinforcements brought with them twenty five thousand suits of armour. After uniting with Memnon's forces, Alexander decided to head south, following the river Hydaspes, after the omens ostensibly declared it unfavourable to march further east. Initially, the fleet and army just sailed down the river, occasionally marching short distances inland. Only slight opposition was experienced.

Alexander received news that the Mallians and the Oxydracians had decided to trade hostages with each other, and moved all their valuables into their fortified cities. They decided to combine their forces in order to prevent him from marching through their territory. Reports suggested that they had a total of 90,000 foot, 10,000 horse and 900 chariots. In spite of the fact that the two had traditionally been enemies, it was reported that they had laid aside their disputes to fight the Macedonians. Alexander decided to prevent them from joining their forces.

It was Alexander's habit, as with his father, to campaign in all seasons of the year. In Greece, this meant the winter, but in India, it meant the rainy season or cold season. The Mallian alliance was unaware of this practice, and therefore might have expected more time to prepare for Alexander's advance. Throughout his career, Alexander made many celebrated marches in spite of difficult conditions. After the Battle of Gaugamela Alexander and his forces are alleged to have reached the Great Zab, 34 miles (55 km) from the battlefield, only one day later.

== Phases ==
=== First ===
First phase

Upon receiving the news of the alliance in November, Alexander raced out to prevent the junction of the two tribes. He reached the area in five days by sailing down the Hydaspes with the fleet he had recently built. The boats had been built to be taken apart and put back together, so that they could be conveyed across the Punjab. There were, as there are now, five rivers in the Punjab - it is sometimes referred to as "The Valley of the Five Rivers" - so it was necessary to drag the boats from one to the next. The Hydaspes and Acesines were dangerous to sail down in this area, and the Macedonians sustained considerable damage to some of their ships, in addition to some casualties. They used two sorts of vessels, warships and the transport ships known as "round vessels". The transport ships were not damaged, as their round hulls helped them navigate the difficult channels. By contrast, the warships had considerable difficulties, and many were destroyed. Their double rows of oars meant that the bottom row of oars would get caught on the river bank. At one point Alexander even took off his armour, preparing to jump in the water, for fear that his ship was going to sink.

However, the Macedonians got through. Arriving in the confederacies' territory, they set about the task of pacification. While their ships were undergoing repairs, the Macedonians first attacked a tribe to the west called the Sibea. This tribe, alleged to have 40,000 warriors, was on the right bank, and thus the Macedonians had to cross the river in order to attack them. The Macedonians destroyed their capital city and burned their crops, slew all the males, and enslaved the women and children. Previously, Alexander had been scrupulous about being merciful towards the inhabitants of his newly conquered territories. This marked change in policy was intended as an example to the other tribes. It was done, allegedly, to secure the Macedonians' line of communications, which, being already over-extended, were at a serious risk of being cut. They extended all the way from Babylon to the Punjab, if they were cut anywhere the entire expedition could have been compromised. No half measures were taken in securing the lines of communications in their extended condition.

Alexander was determined not to let the Mallians escape him, and therefore he planned a sophisticated campaign that allowed him to retain the interior lines, so that he could reinforce himself at any threatened point.

He added Philip's corps, Polyperchon's brigade, the horse-bowmen and the elephants which had been marching down the river, to Craterus' force. He then ordered Nearchus to sail down the river with the fleet and establish a base to conduct further operations at the junction of the Acesines and the Hydraotis. In addition, the base would be used to catch any escaping Mallians. Three days later, Alexander ordered Craterus to follow him down the river on the right bank.

First phase continued

Alexander divided his army into three parts and crossed over onto the left bank. His own force was to march directly across the desert, and was to take upon itself the most difficult work, as was his habit. His force consisted of hypaspists, archers, Agrianians, Peithon's brigade of the phalanx, the horse archers and half the Companion cavalry. While it was a difficult march across the desert, the march was to serve two purposes; first it was to surprise the Mallians, secondly it was to afford him a strategic position from which he could drive them to the south, so that they would be pressed towards the rest of his forces. Hephaestion's force was ordered to march opposite Craterus' force, on the left bank of the same river. He was sent five days ahead of Alexander, in order to ensure that any retreating forces Alexander impelled would be easily caught if they managed to evade Craterus. Ptolemy I Soter's force was ordered to follow Alexander's march three days later, in order to ensure that any Mallians that did escape to the north were still captured and slaughtered.

=== Second ===
At this point, the tentative alliance between the Mallians and the Oxydracians began to break down. The two tribes could not agree on who was to lead them, and their forces retreated to their strongholds, each group to fend for themselves.

After starting across the desert, Alexander marched continuously, with only a single half-day halt at a place where water could be obtained. His detachment of the army marched 45 miles (72 km) in about 24 hours. Arriving near the city of Kot Kamalia at daybreak, Alexander rode ahead with his Companion cavalry and totally surprised the Mallians — so much so that many of them were still outside the city. As Alexander had expected, they did not think he would cross the desert. A vast number of them were slain, and Alexander chased those whom he could not massacre into the city. He then created a cordon of cavalry around this relatively small town, and awaited the arrival of his infantry.

Second phase

When the infantry arrived, Alexander detached Perdiccas with the cavalry of Cleitus the White and his own cavalry, and ordered him to surround another Mallian city to the south-east. However, he gave him specific instructions not to actually besiege the city, for fear that some of the inhabitants would flee and give news of what was going on to others in the area, giving them time to escape. Alexander desired that Perdiccas should await his own arrival with the rest of the force. This is another example of Alexander taking up each and every task he deemed to be important in person, this was a practice he repeated throughout all of his campaigns. It was soon after this that Alexander took the city that he was currently besieging, employing siege equipment such as the torsion catapult. The torsion catapult was the most powerful of the era, and had revolutionised siege warfare; Alexander would use it to capture all the other cities in the region. Alexander's army then overcame the city's garrison, two thousand strong, and killed them all. When Perdiccas arrived at the town he was supposed to take, he found it empty; he chased down the survivors and put them to the sword.

Alexander allowed his men to rest until the first watch of the night. After this, the Macedonians continued to pursue the Mallians, the next town being the modern Brahmin town of Atari. Upon arriving, Alexander immediately sent his phalanx forward and prepared to undermine the city walls. However, the Indians, who were by now familiar with Alexander's expertise in besieging, decided they could hold out better in the citadel. The Macedonians followed. Alexander led a siege of the citadel, bringing his phalanx up towards the walls. The citadel was burnt, and five thousand Mallians died within its walls.

After taking a single day's rest, Alexander headed for the city of Mallians (this city has been identified as present-day Multan, although this identification is not certain). However, the Mallians had crossed the river already, and were awaiting his arrival on the western bank.

=== Final ===
Final phase

Before continuing his campaign against the Mallians, Alexander sent Peithon and Demetrius back towards the river, the forests, and the desert. Their orders were to kill anyone who did not submit. The reason was that so many of the cities were deserted when Alexander's forces reached them. Refugees from these cities had been taken prisoner in the forests in the area alongside the Hydraotis.

The Malli offered battle to Alexander on the high ground of the western bank of the Hydraotis. However, Alexander and his army had become such an object of fear in their eyes that he decided to charge them across the river. This was not a new tactic, as his father Phillip II had perfected the cavalry arm of Macedon to such an extent that the infantry, on many occasions, would only attack after the cavalry. The Mallians fled without the Macedonian infantry even joining battle. Alexander pursued them with his cavalry for 5 miles (8.0 km).

Cavalry attack

The Mallians, realising how small the number of Macedonian cavalry was, chose to stop and fight them. Arrian estimated that there were fifty thousand Mallians at this point. As expert as the Companion cavalry was, Alexander had placed himself in a vulnerable situation. However, the Macedonians formed up and circled around the Mallians, attacking them in the flank and rear. Eventually, the Macedonian light infantry came up, and the Mallians lost heart and fled to the city of Mallians. Alexander followed them to the city, and then rested his columns for the rest of the day.

== Siege of the citadel ==
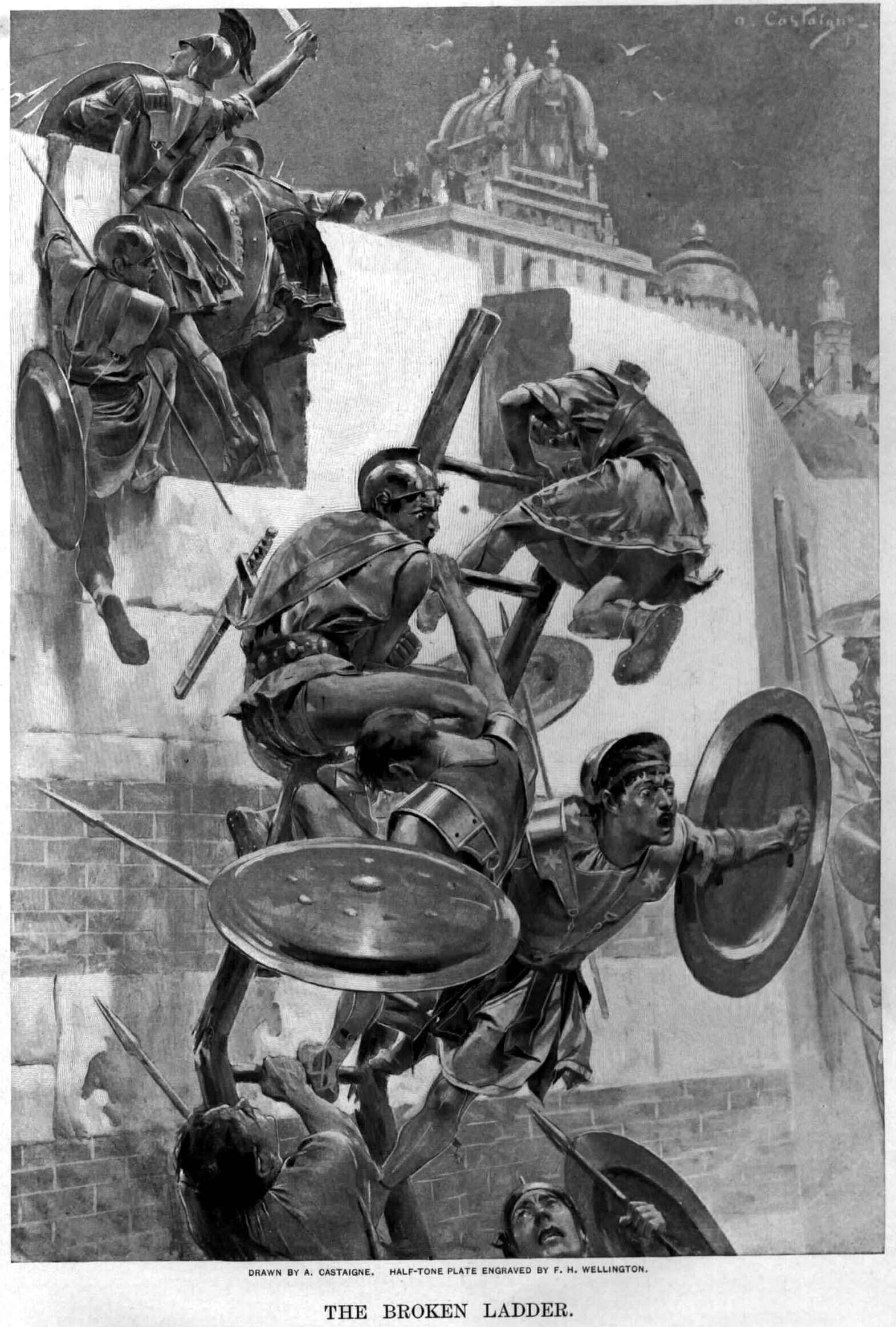
The ladder breaks stranding Alexander and a few companions within the Mallian town. André Castaigne (1898-1899).

Alexander arranged two separate forces, one to be led by himself and the other by Perdiccas. The Indians almost immediately retreated into the main citadel. The citadel was substantial, with its walls a mile around. But Alexander was able to force one of the gates, and made his way into the outer parts of the citadel. There the Macedonians began to undermine the next layer of walls.

Having grown impatient with the sluggish pace of the siege, Alexander grabbed a ladder and ascended the wall himself. He was followed by only a few soldiers. Arrian reports three soldiers on the wall, Abreas, Peucestas, and Leonnatus. Plutarch reports only two: Peucestas and Limnaeus. Either report confirms one of them dies: Abreas or Limnaeus respectively. The rest of the soldiers, anxious for the safety of their king, crowded the ladders to reach the top and protect him. There were too many of them, and the ladders collapsed under their weight. 'Owing to the brilliance of his arms and the boldness of his conduct', the Mallians realised who Alexander was and began hurling projectiles at him. Many of Alexander's men extended their arms and bade him jump back down to them. The King, however, would not.

Alexander instead leapt down inside the citadel, where he killed the Mallians' leader. During the fight, an arrow penetrated Alexander's armor, severely wounding him; Arrian reports that 'blood and air came hissing out of the wound.' He fought on for some time with the arrow in his lung, placing his back against the citadel wall and fending off the Mallian soldiers. Attempting to prop himself up on a nearby tree, he suffered a massive hemorrhage and lost consciousness. The Macedonians, having at last scaled the citadel wall, jumped down to defend him, but, believing Alexander was dead, forced open the entrance to the city and slaughtered all its inhabitants in revenge.

== Result ==
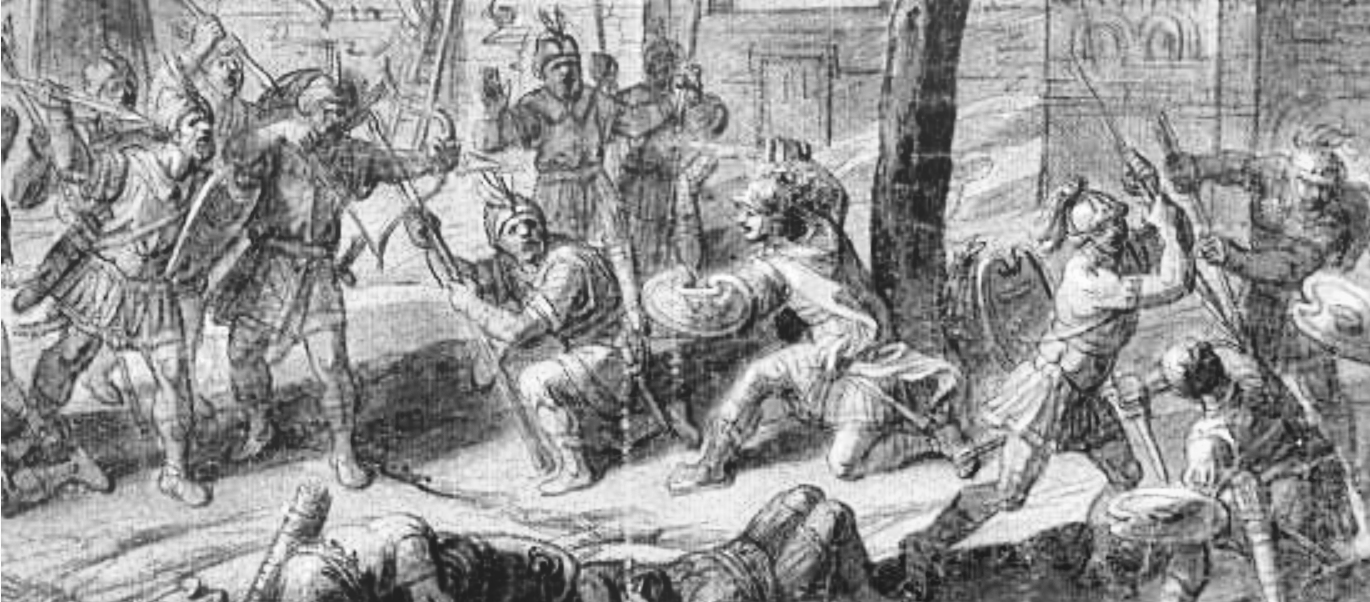
Alexander at the wall of Multan in the Punjab. From a drawing by François Verdier (1651-1730).

When the Macedonians reached Alexander, "who was lying in a faint condition", some of them placed him on a shield and quickly ran back with him to a tent. An incision had to be made in order to get the arrow out, but there was indecision as to who should perform the procedure. According to Arrian, some authors "stated that Critodemus, a physician of Cos, an Asclepiad by birth, made an incision into the injured part and drew the weapon out of the wound", while others claimed "that as there was no physician present at the critical moment, Perdiccas [...] at Alexander's bidding", removed the arrow with his sword, causing "a copious effusion of blood" which rendered Alexander unconscious. The soldiers were very anxious about his health, since they believed he was the only one who could lead them "back in safety to their own country, being quite enclosed by so many warlike nations, some of whom had not yet submitted, and who they conjectured would fight stoutly for their freedom; while others would no doubt revolt as soon as they were relieved of their fear of Alexander." For some days he hovered between life and death.

The main body of the army, four days away from Alexander's location, heard that he was dead. Rumours spread, and when reports came in that he was alive and was recovering, they would not believe it. He was eventually placed upon a boat so that he and his men could see one another, with Alexander ordering "the tent covering to be removed from the stern, that he might be visible to all." In spite of this, his troops were initially still under the impression that he was dead, and that "his corpse was being conveyed on the vessel", until "he stretched out his hand to the multitude". However, his health was in such a delicate state that during his course down the river they would not even row the boat, for fear that the oars slapping the water would disturb him.

Four days afterwards, the Macedonians reached a fertile country which the natives had completely deserted. Alexander was confronted by some of his close companions. They told him that he should not expose himself so recklessly in battle. Alexander received the final submission of the Malli, who had submitted after the capture of their capital city. He sent their ambassadors away, and they returned later with 300 four horse chariots. In addition to this, Alexander also received 1,000 Indian shields, a number of lions and 100 talents.
