= Indian campaign of Alexander the Great =

Ancient Greek military campaign in the northwestern Indian subcontinent

- Part of the Wars of Alexander the Great
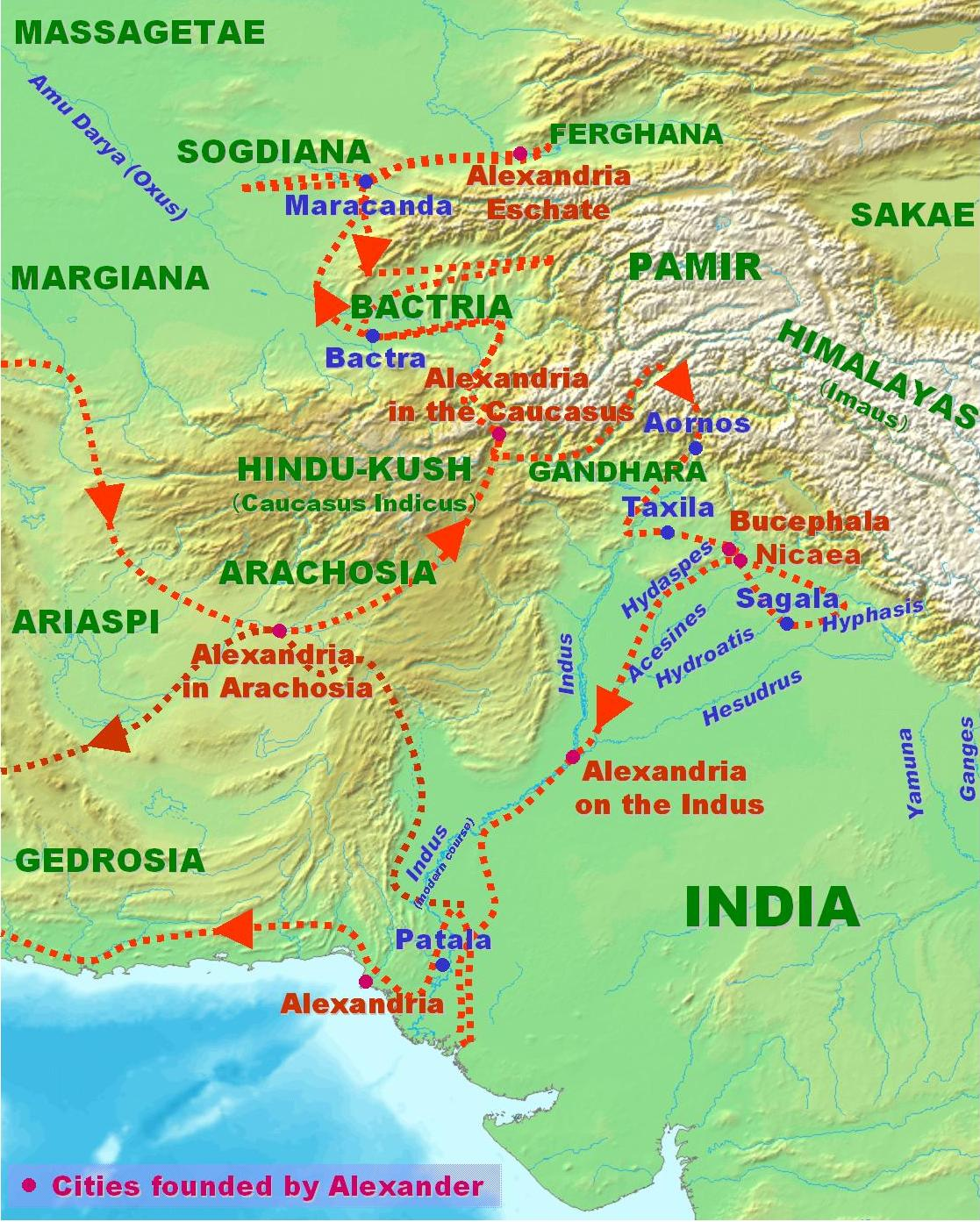
- Routes taken by the Macedonian army into the Indus Valley
Date	327–325 BC; 2351 years ago
Location	Northwestern Indian subcontinent
Result	Macedonian victory
Territorial changes	Macedonian Empire annexes northwestern Indian subcontinent

Belligerents
Macedonian Empire; Gandhara	Aśvaka; Guraeans; Pauravas; Mallians; Oxydracians; Agalasseis

Commanders and leaders
Alexander the Great (WIA); Ptolemy; Peithon; Craterus; Coenus; Taxiles	Porus (WIA); Cleophis; Astis; Sambus

The Indian campaign of Alexander the Great began in 327 BC and lasted until 325 BC. After conquering the Achaemenid Persian Empire, the Macedonian army undertook an expedition into the northwestern Indian subcontinent. Within two years, Alexander the Great expanded the Macedonian Empire, a Hellenistic kingdom, to include Gandhara and the Indus Valley (present-day Punjab and Sindh), surpassing the earlier frontiers established by the Persian Achaemenid conquest.

Following annexation of Gandāra (a former Persian satrapy), Alexander and his troops advanced into Punjab, where he received submission of the king Omphis of the city of Taxila, and confronted Porus, another regional king. In 326 BC, Alexander defeated the Pauravas under Porus in the Battle of the Hydaspes, although the engagement was possibly the Macedonians' most costly battle.

Alexander's continued eastward march was leading his army into a confrontation with the Nanda Empire, based in Magadha. According to Greek sources, the Nanda army was five times the size of the Macedonian army; Alexander's troops — increasingly exhausted, homesick, and anxious by the prospects of having to further face large Indian armies throughout the Indo-Gangetic Plain — mutinied at the Hyphasis River, refusing to advance his push to the east. After a meeting with his army general Coenus, during which he was informed of his soldiers' laments, Alexander relented under the conviction that it was better to return. He subsequently turned southward, advancing through southern Punjab as well as Sindh, where he conquered more tribes along the lower areas of the Indus River, before finally turning westward to reach Macedon by crossing the hazardous Gedrosian desert.

== Background ==
=== Sources ===
Of those who accompanied Alexander to India, Aristobulus, Onesicritus, and Nearchus wrote about the Indian campaign. The only surviving contemporary account of Alexander's Indian campaign is a report of the voyage of the naval commander Nearchus, who was tasked with exploring the coast between the Indus River and the Persian Gulf. This report is preserved in Arrian's Anabasis (c. 150 AD). Arrian provides a detailed account of Alexander's campaigns, based on the writings of Alexander's companions and courtiers.

Arrian's account is supplemented by the writings of other authors, whose works are also based on the accounts of Alexander's companions: these authors include Diodorus (c. 21 BC), Strabo (c. 23 AD), and Plutarch (c. 119 AD).

=== Socio-political conditions in India ===
Alexander's incursion into India took place primarily in the Indus River basin area, which was divided among several small states. These states appear to have been based on dominance of particular tribes, as the Greek writers mention tribes such as the Malloi as well as kings whose names seem to be tribal designations. The Achaemenid Empire of Persia had held suzerainty over the Indus valley in the previous decades, but there was no trace of Achaemenid rule beyond the Indus river when Alexander's army arrived in the region. Strabo, sourcing his information from the earlier writer Eratosthenes, states that the Achaemenid king controlled the area to the west of the Indus. This area (including the Kapisa-Gandhara region) was probably the territory of the Indians, who according to the Greek accounts, fought alongside their overlord Darius III at the Battle of Gaugamela.

Greek writings as well as archaeological excavations indicate the existence of an urban economy dependent on agriculture and trade in the Indus basin. The Greeks mention the existence of cities and fortified towns such as Taxila. Arrian mentions that after defeating Porus, Alexander marched eastwards towards the Chenab River, and captured 37 towns: the smallest of these towns had 5,000 or more inhabitants. In the Swat Valley, Alexander is said to have seized 230,000 oxen (possibly Zebu), intending to send them to Macedonia for ploughing land. Aristobulus saw rice being grown in paddy fields, Onesicritus reported the existence of a crop called bosmoran (possibly the pearl millet), and Nearchus wrote of "honey-yielding reeds" (presumably the sugarcane). Nearchus also mentions that Indians wore clothes made of cotton. Rock salt was extracted from the Salt Range, and supplied to other parts of India. Some primitive communities existed in the forest, desert, and coastal regions of the subcontinent. For example, Nearchus mentions that people around the Tomeros river (Hingol) subsisted on fishing, and used stone tools instead of iron ones.

The Greek writers mention the priestly class of Brahmanas (as "Brachmanes"), who are described as teachers of Indian philosophy. They do not refer to the existence of any religious temples or idols in India, although such references commonly occur in their descriptions of Alexander's campaigns in Egypt, Mesopotamia and Iran. Greek accounts mention naked ascetics called gymnosophists. A philosopher named Calanus (probably a Greek transcription of the Indian name "Kalyana") accompanied Alexander to Persepolis, where he committed suicide on a public funeral pyre; he was probably a Jain or an Ajivika monk. There is no reference to Buddhism in the Greek accounts.

Other than their mention of the Brahmanas, the Greek narratives about Alexander's invasion do not directly mention the caste system. Some Brahmanas acted as advisors to local princes: Alexander had groups of Brahmanas hanged in present-day Sindh for instigating the rulers Musicanus and Sambus to revolt against him. The Greek writings attest the existence of slavery in at least two places: Onesicritus describes slavery in the territory ruled by Musicanus, and Aristobulus mentions poor people selling their daughters publicly in Taxila. Aristobulus also observed Sati, the practice of widows immolating themselves on their husbands' pyre, at Taxila. The practice of exposing dead bodies to vultures, similar to the Magian practice of Tower of Silence, was also prevalent in Taxila.

Nearchus mentions that Indians wrote letters on closely woven cloth; it is possible that this is a reference to a precursor of the Kharoshthi script, which may have developed from the Aramaic alphabet during the Achaemenid rule. While describing a tribe on the coast of present-day Balochistan, Nearchus mentions that they were different from Indians in "their language and customs", which implies that he associated a particular language with the Indians. This does not mean that the Indians spoke a single language: the language that Nearchus associated with India might have been a lingua franca used for official and commercial purposes. This lingua franca was most probably the Gandhari Prakrit, as the Greek names (e.g. "Taxila" and "Sandrokottus") for Indian people and places seem to be derived from this language (e.g. "Takhasila" and "Chandagutta") rather than Sanskrit (e.g. "Takshashila" and "Chandragupta").

Nearchus attests the existence of medical science in India: he mentions that when the Greek physicians failed to provide remedies for snake-bites to Alexander, the king gathered Indian healers who were also able to cure other diseases and painful conditions. The Greek accounts do not mention any other sciences of contemporary India.

=== Alexander's preparation ===
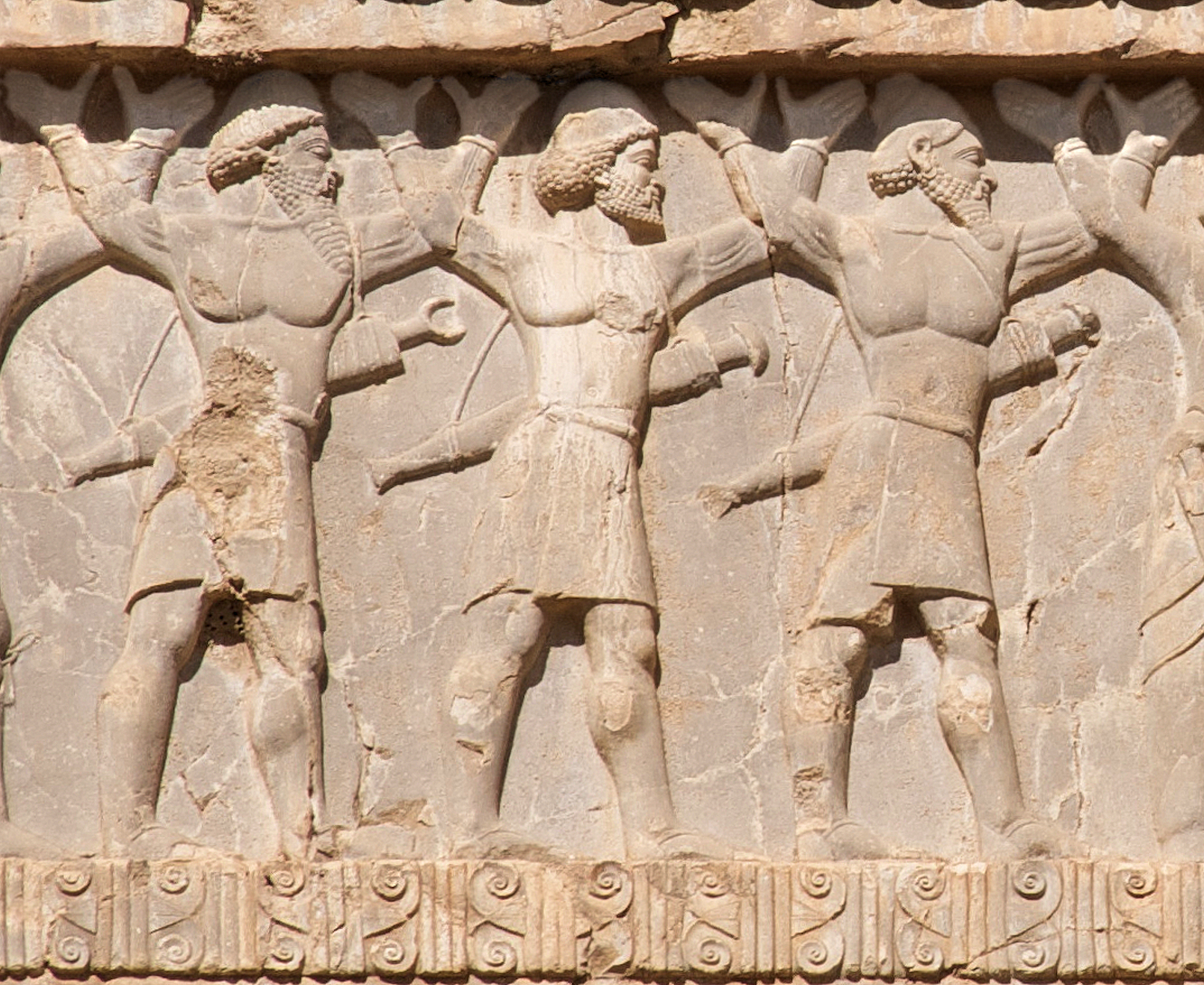
Ancient Indian warriors (from left to right: Sattagydian, Gandharan, Hindush) c. 480 BC. Naqsh-e Rostam reliefs of Xerxes I.

After the death of Spitamenes and his marriage to Roxana (Raoxshna in Old Iranian) in 326 BC to cement his relations with his new Central Asian satrapies, Alexander was finally free to turn his attention to India. For Alexander, the invasion of India was a natural consequence of his subjugation of the Achaemenid Empire, as the areas of the Indus Valley had long been under Achaemenid control, since the Achaemenid conquest of the Indus Valley c. 515 BC. Alexander was only taking possession of territories which he had obtained from the Achaemenids, and now considered rightfully his own.

Alexander invited all the chieftains of the former satrapy of Gandāra, to come to him and submit to his authority. Omphis (Indic: Ambhi), ruler of Taxila, whose kingdom extended from the Indus to the Jhelum (Greek: Hydaspes), complied. At the end of the spring of 327 BC, Alexander started on his Indian expedition leaving Amyntas behind with 3,500 horse and 10,000 foot soldiers to hold the land of the Bactrians.

== Cophen campaign ==
In the satrapy of Gandāra, Alexander personally took command of the shield-bearing guards, foot-companions, archers, Agrianians, and horse-javelin-men and led them against the clans — the Aspasioi of Kunar Valley, the Guraeans of Panjkora Valley, and the Assakenoi of the Swat Valley.

Alexander faced resistance from Astis or Astes (Hasti), the chief of the Astakenoi or Astanenoi tribe, whose capital was Pushkalavati or Peukelaotis. Astes died defending his capital and Peucelaotis was annexed, with another local noble Sangaeus being appointed as satrap in his place. He later defeated the Aspasioi and captured their 40,000 men and 230,000 oxen; in the course of which Alexander himself was wounded in the shoulder by a dart, but eventually the Aspasioi lost the fight. Assakenoi of Massaga fought him under the command of their queen, Cleophis, with an army of 30,000 cavalry, 38,000 infantry, 30 elephants, and 7,000 mercenaries. Other regions that fought Alexander were Abhisara, Aornos, Bazira, and Ora or Dyrta.

The Assakenoi fought bravely and offered stubborn resistance to the invader in their strongholds. The fort of Massaga could only be reduced after several days of bloody fighting in which Alexander himself was wounded seriously in the ankle. When the chieftain of Massaga fell in the battle, the supreme command of the army went to his old mother, Cleophis, with women of the locality also going into war. Alexander was only able to reduce Massaga by resorting to political stratagem and actions of betrayal. According to Curtius: "Not only did Alexander slaughter the entire population of Massaga, but also did he reduce its buildings to rubbles". A similar slaughter then followed at Ora, another stronghold of the Assakenoi.

=== Siege of Aornos ===
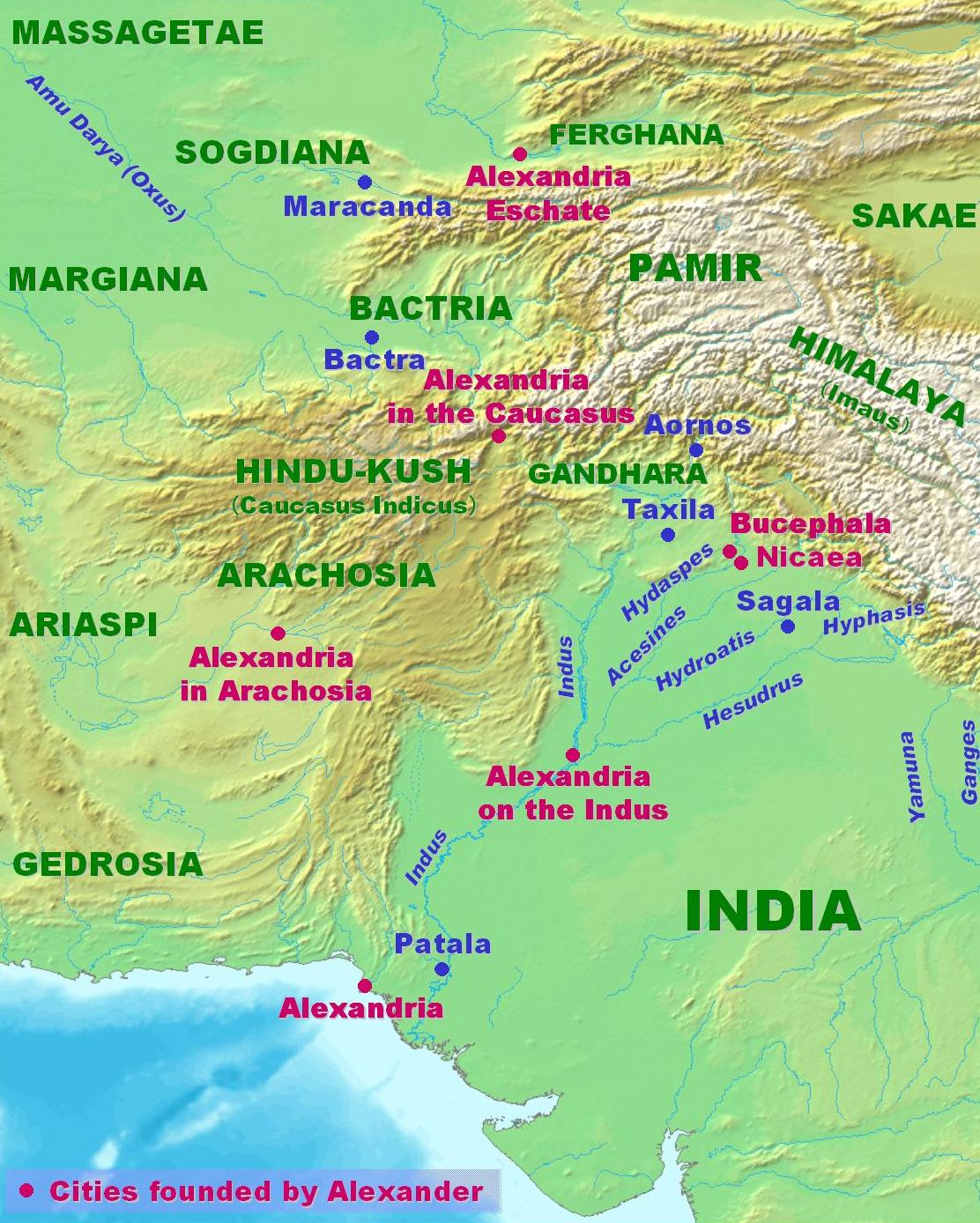
The Aornos is located to the north of Taxila, Pakistan.

In the aftermath of general slaughter and arson committed by Alexander at Massaga and Ora, numerous Assakenoi fled to a high fortress called Aornos (not definitely identified but somewhere in northern Pakistan). Alexander followed close behind their heels and besieged the strategic hill-fort. The siege of Aornos was Alexander's last siege, "the climax to Alexander's career as the greatest besieger in history", according to Robin Lane Fox. The siege took place in April 326 BC. It presented the last threat to Alexander's supply line, which stretched, dangerously vulnerable, over the Hindu Kush back to Balkh, though Arrian credits Alexander's heroic desire to outdo his kinsman Heracles, who allegedly had proved unable to take the place Pir-Sar, which the Greeks called Aornis. The site lies on a strongly reinforced mountain spur above the narrow gorges in a bend of the upper Indus. At the vulnerable north side leading to the fort, Alexander and his catapults were stopped by a deep ravine. To bring the siege engines within reach, an earthwork mound was constructed to bridge the ravine. A low hill connected to the nearest tip of Pir-Sar was soon within reach and taken. Alexander's troops were at first repelled by boulders rolled down from above. Three days of drumbeats marked the defenders' celebration of the initial repulse, followed by a surprise retreat. Hauling himself up the last rockface on a rope, Alexander cleared the summit, slaying some fugitives — inflated by Arrian to a massacre — and erected altars to Athena Nike, Athena of Victory, traces of which were identified by Aurel Stein. Sisikottus, or Saśigupta, who had helped Alexander in this campaign, was made the hyparch of Aornos.

== Battle of the Hydaspes ==
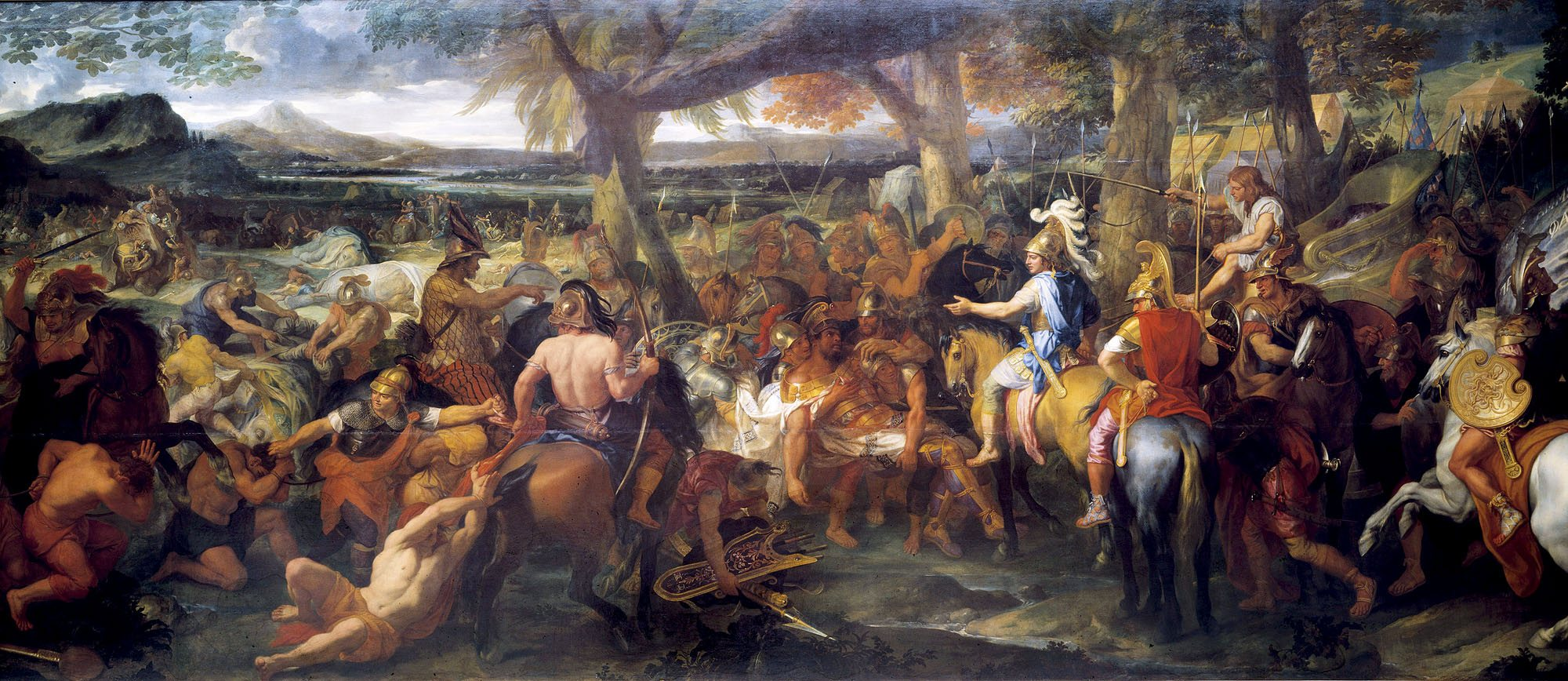
A painting by Charles Le Brun depicting Alexander and Porus (Puru) during the Battle of the Hydaspes.

After reducing Aornos, Alexander crossed the Indus to begin campaigning in the Punjab region. The main train went through the Khyber Pass, but a smaller force under the personal command of Alexander went via the northern route, resulting in the siege of Aornos along the way. In early spring of the next year, he combined his forces and allied with Taxiles (also Ambhi), the King of Taxila, against his neighbor, Porus. He also received submission of kings like Sophytes.

The Battle of the Hydaspes River was fought by Alexander in July 326 BC against king Porus (possibly king of Paurava) on Hydaspes (Jhelum River) in the Punjab, near Bhera. The Hydaspes was the last major battle fought by Alexander.

Arrian writes about Porus, in his own words:

One of the Indian Kings called Porus, a man remarkable alike for his personal strength and noble courage, on hearing the report about Alexander, began to prepare for the inevitable. Accordingly, when hostilities broke out, he ordered his army to attack Macedonians from whom he demanded their king, as if he was his private enemy. Alexander lost no time in joining battle, but his horse being wounded in the first charge, he fell headlong to the ground, and was saved by his attendants who hastened up to his assistance.

Porus drew up on the south bank of the Jhelum River, and was set to repel any crossings. The Jhelum was deep and fast enough that any opposed crossing would probably doom the entire attacking force. Alexander knew that a direct crossing would fail, so he found a suitable crossing, about 27 km (17 mi) upstream of his camp. The name of the place is "Kadee". Alexander left his general Craterus behind with most of the army while he crossed the river upstream with a strong contingent. Porus sent a small cavalry and chariot force under his son to the crossing.

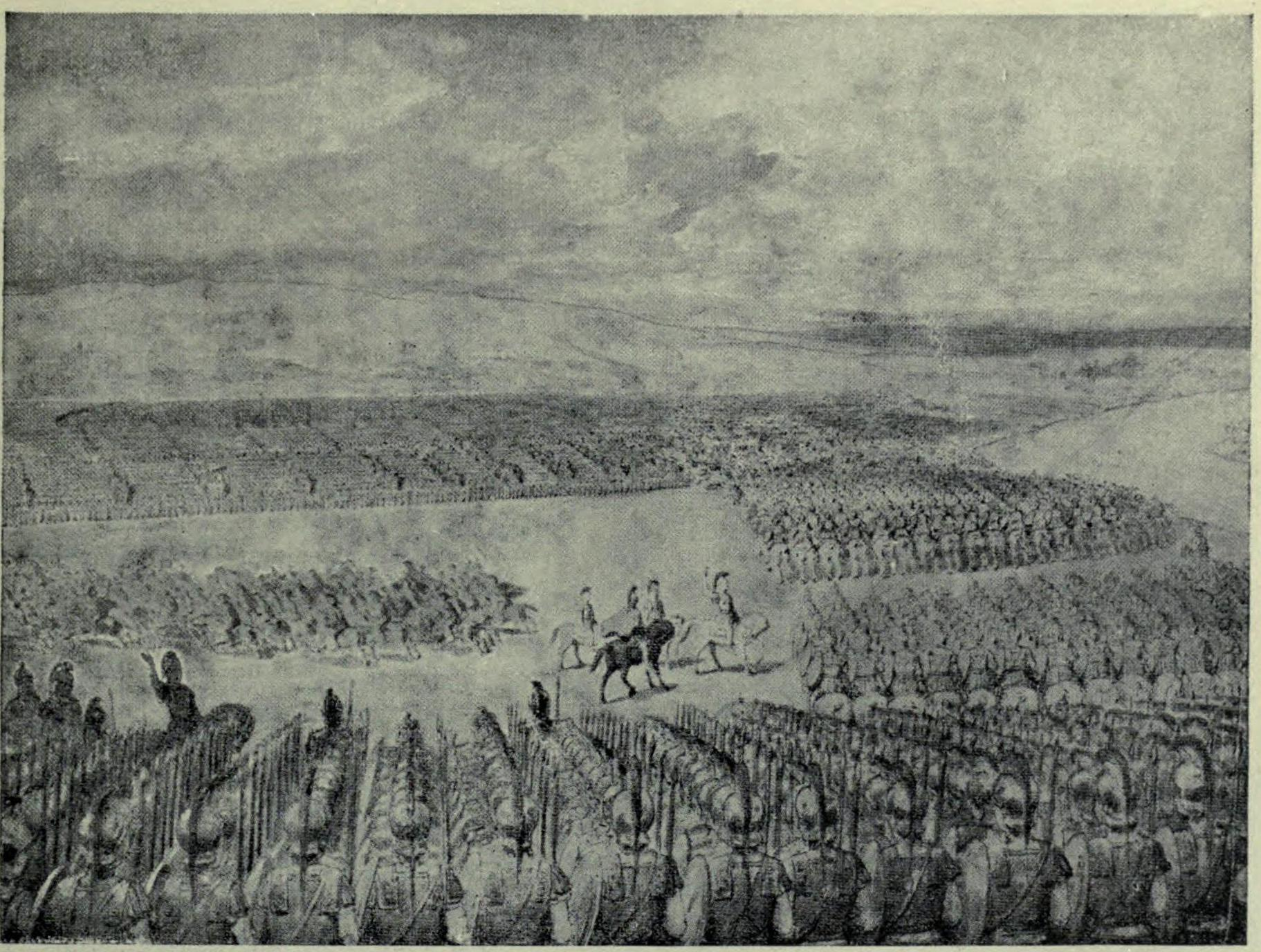
Porus awaits the attack of Alexander, July, 326 BCE

Alexander had already encountered Porus's son, so the two men were not strangers. Porus's son killed Alexander's horse with one blow, and Alexander fell to the ground. Also writing about this encounter, Arrian adds,

Other writers state that there was a fight at the actual landing between Alexander's cavalry and a force of Indians commanded by Porus's son, who was there ready to oppose them with superior numbers, and that in the course of fighting he (Porus's son) wounded Alexander with his own hand and struck the blow which killed his (Alexander's) beloved horse Buccaphalus.

The force was easily routed, and according to Arrian, Porus' son was killed. Porus now saw that the crossing force was larger than he had expected, and decided to face it with the bulk of his army. Porus's army were poised with cavalry on both flanks, the war elephants in front, and infantry behind the elephants. These war elephants presented an especially difficult situation for Alexander, as they scared the Macedonian horses.

Alexander started the battle by sending horse archers to shower the Porus's left cavalry wing, and then used his cavalry to destroy Porus's cavalry. Meanwhile, the Macedonian phalanxes had crossed the river to engage the charge of the war elephants. The Macedonians eventually surrounded Porus's force.

Diodorus wrote about the battle tactics of war elephants:

Upon this the elephants, applying to good use their prodigious size and strength, killed some of the enemy by trampling under their feet, and crushing their armour and their bones, while upon other they inflicted a terrible death, for they first lifted them aloft with their trunks, which they twisted round their bodies and then dashed them down with great violence to the ground. Many others they deprived in a moment of life by goring them through and through with their tusks.

The fighting style of Porus' soldiers was described in detail by Arrian:

The foot soldiers carry a bow made of equal length with the man who bears it. This they rest upon the ground, and pressing against it with their left foot thus discharges the arrow, having drawn the string far backwards for the shaft they use is little short for three yards long, and there is nothing can resist an Indian archer's shot, neither shield nor breast plate, nor any stronger defence if such there be.

According to Curtius Quintus, Alexander towards the end of the day sent a few ambassadors to Porus:

Alexander, anxious to save the life of this great and gallant soldier, sent Texile the Indian to him (to Porus). Texile rode up as near as he dared and requested him to stop his elephant and hear what message Alexander sent him, escape was no longer possible. But Texiles was an old enemy of the Indian King, and Porus turned his elephant and drove at him, to kill him with his lance; and he might indeed have killed him, if he had not spurred his horse out of the way in the nick of the time. Alexander, however, far from resenting this treatment of his messenger, sent a number of others, last of whom was Indian named Meroes, a man he had been told had long been Porus' friend.

According to Plutarch this was one of Alexander's hardest battles:

The combat then was of a more mixed kind; but maintained with such obstinacy, that it was not decided till the eighth hour of the day.

Plutarch also wrote that the bitter fighting of the Hydaspes made Alexander's men hesitant to continue the conquest of India, considering that they would potentially face far larger armies than those of Porus if they were to cross the Ganges River. Porus was one of the local kings who impressed Alexander. Wounded in his shoulder, standing over 2 m (6 ft 7 in) tall, but still on his feet, he was asked by Alexander how he wished to be treated. "Treat me, Alexander, the way a King treats another King", Porus responded. Other historians question the accuracy of this entire event, arguing that Porus would never have said those words. Philostratus the Elder in the Life of Apollonius of Tyana writes that in the army of Porus there was an elephant who had fought bravely against Alexander's army. Alexander dedicated it to Helios (Sun) and named it Ajax, because he thought that a so great animal deserved a great name. The elephant had gold rings around its tusks and an inscription was on them written in Greek: "Alexander the son of Zeus dedicates Ajax to Helios" (ΑΛΕΞΑΝΔΡΟΣ Ο ΔΙΟΣ ΤΟΝ ΑΙΑΝΤΑ ΤΩΙ ΗΛΙΩΙ).

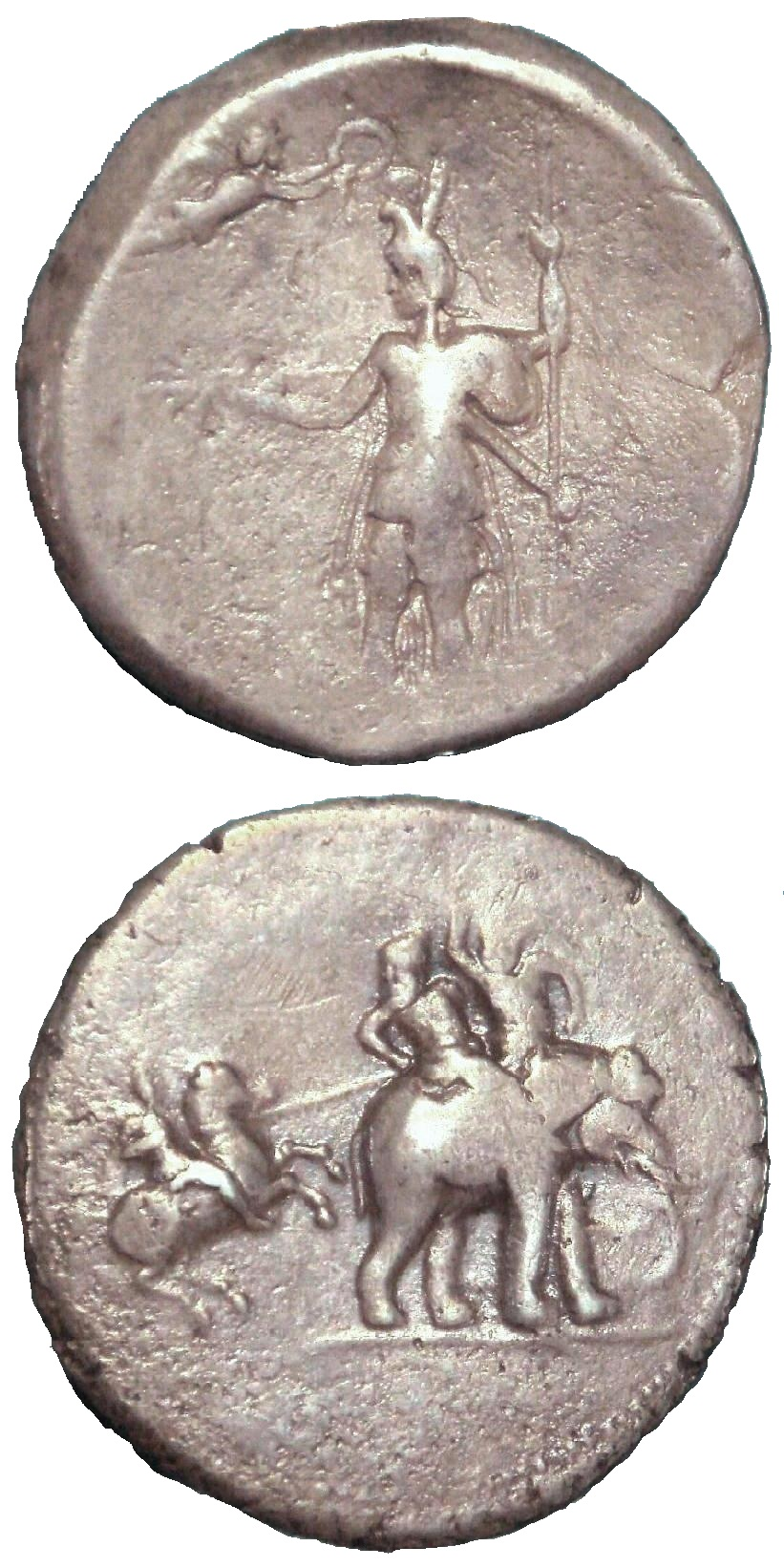
"Victory coin" of Alexander the Great, minted in Babylon c. 322 BC, following his campaigns in the Indian subcontinent. Obverse: Alexander being crowned by Nike. Reverse: Alexander attacking king Porus on his elephant. Silver. British Museum.

Defeat of Porus made kings like Abisares submit to Alexander as well who were until then following the policy of wait and see. Alexander did not continue, thus leaving all the headwaters of the Indus River unconquered. He later founded Alexandria Nikaia (Victory), located at the battle site, to commemorate his triumph. He also founded Alexandria Bucephalus on the opposite bank of the river in memory of his much-cherished horse, Bucephalus, who had carried Alexander through the campaign on the Indian subcontinent and had died heroically during that battle at Hydaspes.

=== Catheans ===
After crossing the Chenab River, Alexander joined by Porus with elephants and 5,000 local troops, laid siege to Sagala, where the Cathaeans had entrenched themselves. The city was razed to the ground, and many of its inhabitants killed:

The Cathaeans... had a strong city near which they proposed to make their stand, named Sagala. (...) The next day Alexander rested his troops, and on the third advanced on Sangala, where the Cathaeans and their neighbours who had joined them were drawn up in front of the city. (...) At this point too, Porus arrived, bringing with him the rest of the elephants and some five thousand of his troops. (...) Alexander returned to Sangala, razed the city to the ground, and annexed its territory.

— Arrian, Anabasis of Alexander, V.22–24

== Revolt of the army ==
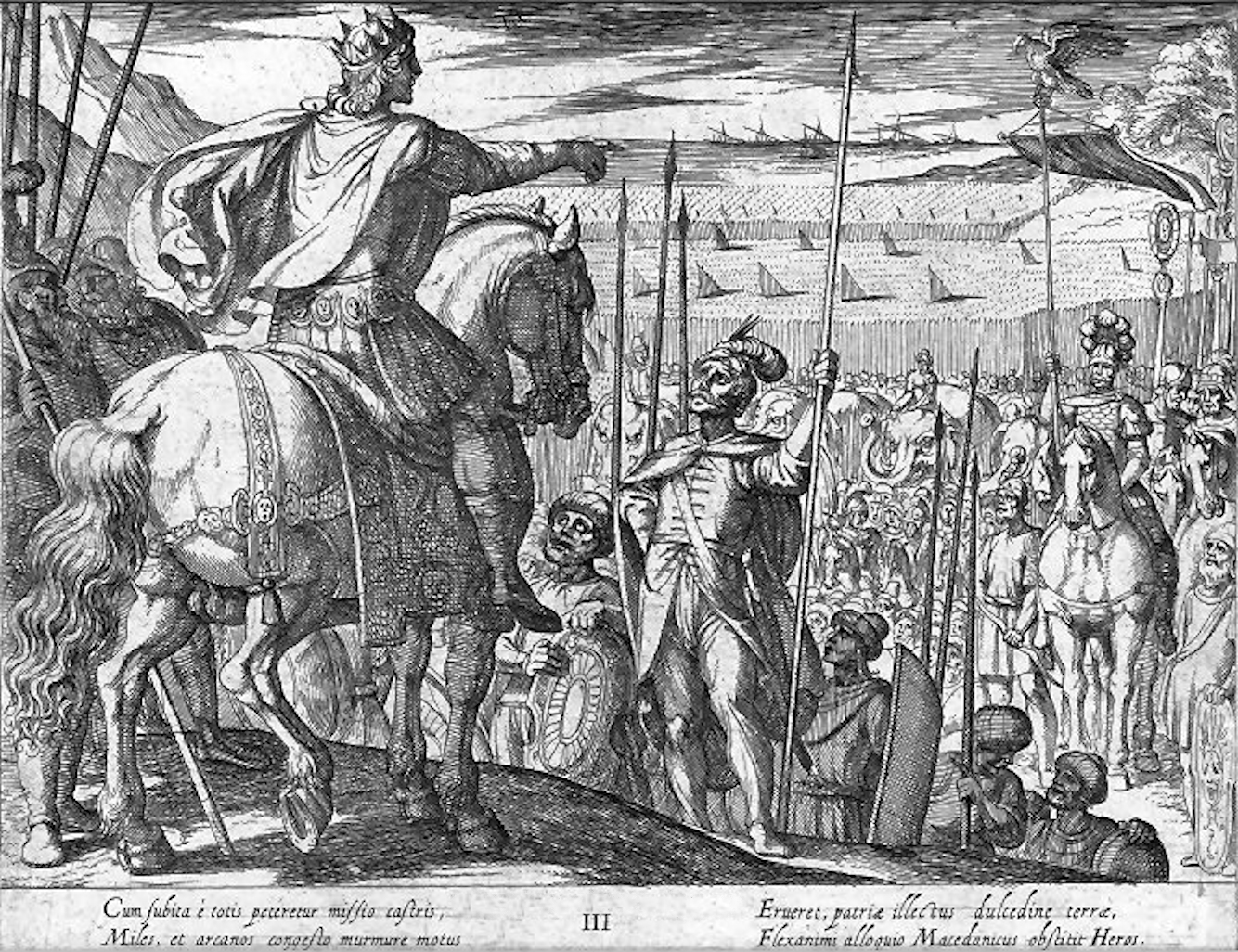
Alexander's troops beg to return home from India in plate 3 of 11 by Antonio Tempesta of Florence, 1608.

East of Porus's kingdom, near the Ganges River, was the powerful Nanda Empire of Magadha and the Gangaridai Empire of Bengal. Fearing the prospects of facing other powerful Indian armies and exhausted by years of campaigning, his army mutinied at the Hyphasis (the modern Beas River), refusing to march further east.

As for the Macedonians, however, their struggle with Porus blunted their courage and stayed their further advance into India. For having had all they could do to repulse an enemy who mustered only twenty thousand infantry and two thousand horse, they violently opposed Alexander when he insisted on crossing the river Ganges also, the width of which, as they learned, was thirty-two furlongs, its depth a hundred fathoms, while its banks on the further side were covered with multitudes of men-at-arms and horsemen and elephants. For they were told that the kings of the Ganderites and Praesii were awaiting them with eighty thousand horsemen, two hundred thousand footmen, eight thousand chariots, and six thousand fighting elephants.

— Plutarch's Lives

Gangaridai, a nation which possesses a vast force of the largest-sized elephants. Owing to this, their country has never been conquered by any foreign king: for all other nations dread the overwhelming number and strength of these animals. Thus Alexander the Macedonian, after conquering all Asia, did not make war upon the Gangaridai, as he did on all others; for when he had arrived with all his troops at the river Ganges, he abandoned as hopeless an invasion of the Gangaridai when he learned that they possessed four thousand elephants well trained and equipped for war.

— Megasthenes, Indika

Alexander, using the incorrect maps of the Greeks, thought that the world ended a mere 1,000 kilometres (620 mi) away, at the edge of India. He therefore spoke to his army and tried to persuade them to march further into India, but Coenus pleaded with him to change his mind and return, saying the men "longed to again see their parents, their wives and children, their homeland". Alexander, seeing the unwillingness of his men, agreed and turned back.

Alexander raised twelve altars to mark the eastern extent of his conquests. The exact location and fate of these altars is unknown, although one historian has suggested that they were later reused to create some of the Pillars of Ashoka.

== Mallian campaign ==
Along the way, his army conquered the Malli clans (in modern-day Multan). During a siege, Alexander jumped into the fortified city with only two of his bodyguards and was wounded seriously by a Mallian arrow. His forces, believing their king dead, took the citadel and unleashed their fury on the Malli who had taken refuge within it, perpetrating a massacre, sparing no man, woman or child. However, due to the efforts of his surgeon, Kritodemos of Kos, Alexander survived the injury. Following this, the surviving Malli surrendered to Alexander's forces, thereby his beleaguered army moved on and conquered more Indian tribes along the way. Another tribe known as Agalasseis was also defeated and their territories annexed.

== Lower Indus Valley ==
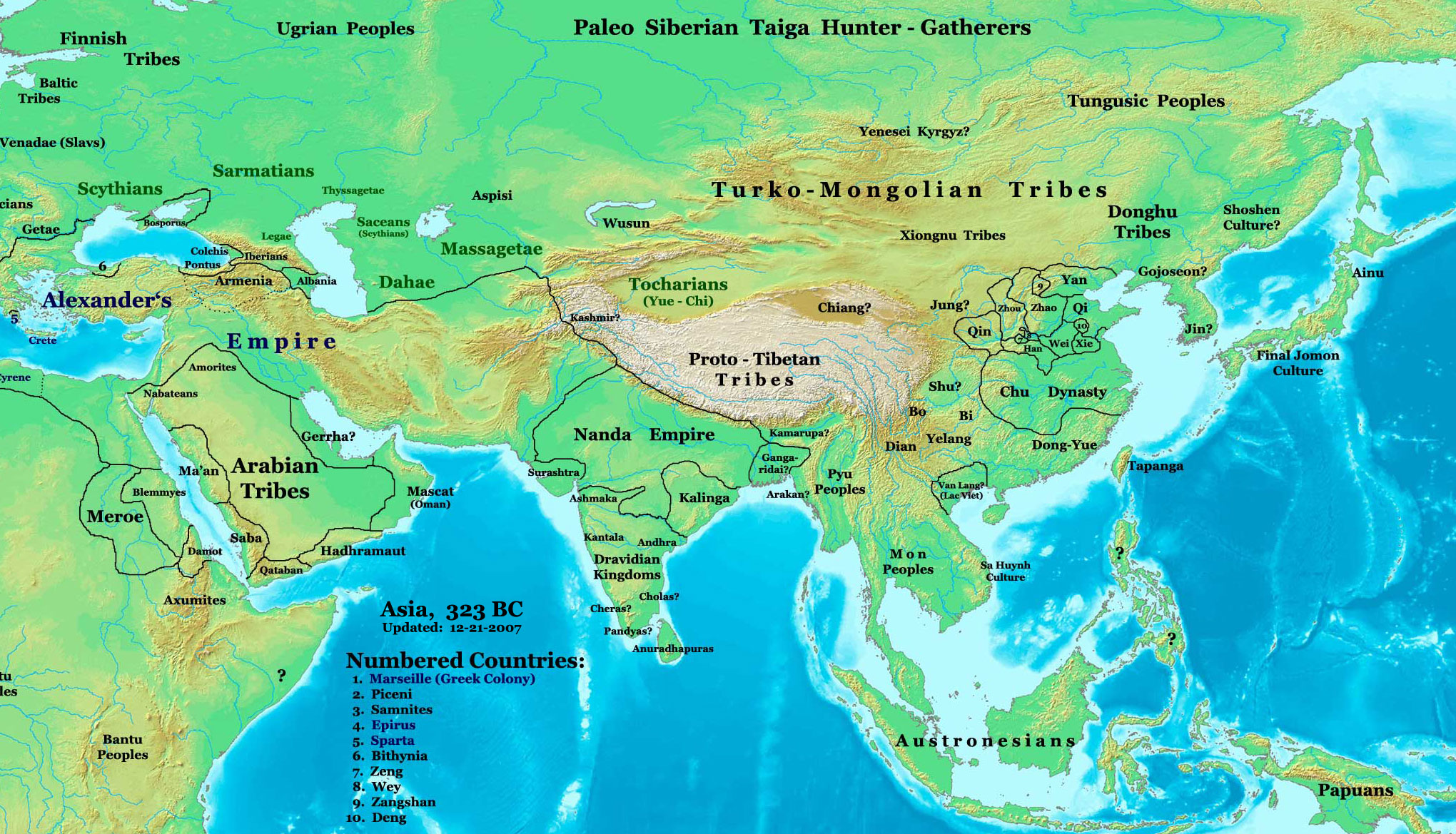
Asia in 323 BC, the Nanda Empire in relation to Alexander's empire and neighbors.

=== Musicanus ===
Musicanus (Ancient Greek: Μουσικανὸς) was the king at the head of the Indus who raised a rebellion against Alexander the Great c. 323 BC. Peithon, one of Alexander's generals, managed to put down the revolt:

Meantime he was informed that Musicanus had revolted. He dispatched the viceroy, Peithon, son of Agenor, with a sufficient army against him, while he himself marched against the cities which had been put under the rule of Musicanus. Some of these he razed to the ground, reducing the inhabitants to slavery; and into others he introduced garrisons and fortified the citadels. After accomplishing this, he returned to the camp and fleet. By this time Musicanus had been captured by Peithon, who was bringing him to Alexander.

— Arrian, Anabasis

=== Porticanus ===
The King of Patala, Porticanus came to Alexander and surrendered. Alexander let him keep possession of his own dominions, with instructions to provide whatever was needed for the reception of the army.

=== Sambus ===
Sambus was yet another ruler in the lower Indus Valley. According to Diodorus Siculus, Alexander invaded his kingdom, killing eighty thousand people and destroying cities. Most of population was taken into slavery, and Sambus himself ‘fled with thirty elephants into the country beyond the Indus’.

== Aftermath ==
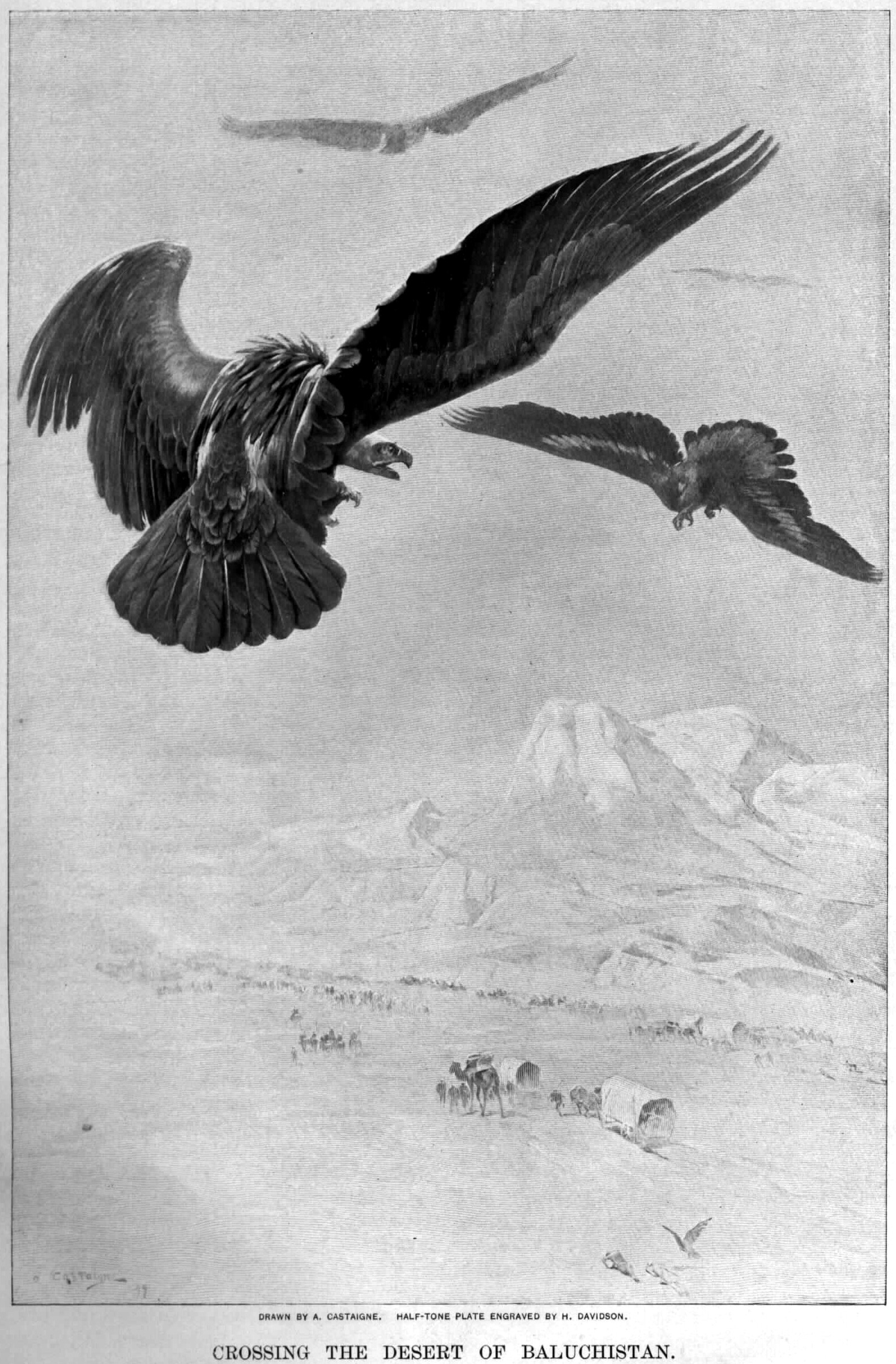
The army crosses the Gedrosian Desert, by Andre Castaigne (1898–1899).

In Alexander's wake, there were many subsequent local revolts, such as by Baryaxes, which were put down or punished by Alexander or his proxies.

Alexander sent much of his army to Carmania (modern-day southern Iran) with his general Craterus, and commissioned a fleet to explore the Persian Gulf shore under his admiral Nearchus while he led the rest of his forces back to Persia by the southern route through the Gedrosian Desert (now part of southern Iran) and Makran (now part of Pakistan). In crossing the desert, Alexander's army took enormous casualties from hunger and thirst, but fought no human enemy. They encountered the "Fish Eaters", or Ichthyophagi, primitive people who lived on the Makran coast of the Arabian Sea, who had matted hair, no fire, no metal, no clothes, lived in huts made of whale bones, and ate raw seafood obtained by beachcombing. During the crossing, Alexander refused as much water as possible, to share the sufferings of his men and to boost the morale of the army.

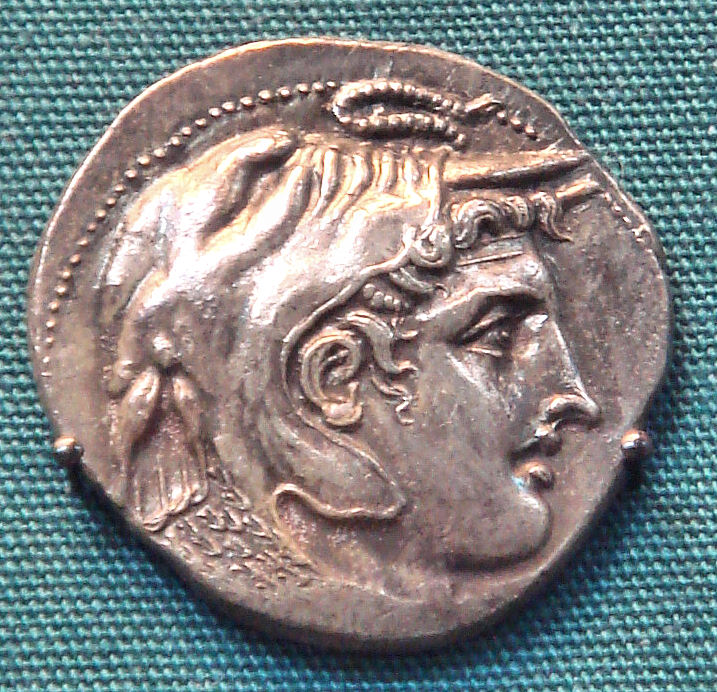
Ptolemy coin with Alexander wearing an elephant scalp, symbol of his conquests in southern Asia.

In the territory of the Indus, Alexander nominated his officer Peithon as a satrap, a position he would hold for the next ten years until 316 BC, and in the Punjab he left Eudemus in charge of the army, at the side of the satrap Porus and Taxiles. Eudemus became ruler of a part of the Punjab after their death. Both rulers returned to the West in 316 BC with their armies. In c. 322 BC, Chandragupta Maurya of Magadha founded the Maurya Empire in India and conquered the Macedonian satrapies during the Seleucid–Mauryan war (305–303 BC).
