= Barsaentes =

Barsaentes (Note: Also spelled "Barzaentes".) (Greek: Βαρσαέντης, romanized: Barsaéntēs) was a Persian nobleman, who served as the satrap of Arachosia and Drangiana under the Achaemenid King of Kings Darius III (r. 336–330 BC).

Barsaentes took part in the Battle of Gaugamela against the Macedonian king Alexander the Great (r. 336–323 BC) in 331 BC, where he led his regional troops, as well as the supposed "Mountain" Indians. Following the Persian defeat, Barsaentes accompanied Darius III in his flight to the Upper Satrapies. There he conspired against Darius III with other Persian grandees, such as the chiliarch Nabarzanes, and Bessus, the satrap of Bactria. Together they arrested Darius III in mid-330 BC, with Bessus being chosen as the leader of the Achaemenid forces, probably due to his Achaemenid descent. The arrest of Darius III gave Alexander the pretext of avenging him. Fleeing from the pursuing Macedonian forces, Bessus and the rebels carried Darius III in a covered wagon, reportedly in golden chains. In order to buy some time for their escape, Bessus and his co-conspirators killed Darius III and left his body by the road.

In 329 BC, Barsaentes fled to his own satrapy. When a Macedonian force of 4,600 led by Menon came close to his satrapy, Barsaentes fled to the Indians, and was given shelter by local dynast, Samaxus. However, the latter handed Barsaentes over to Alexander in 326 BC, seemingly in order to gain the favour of the Macedonian king. Barsaentes was subsequently executed.

== Sources ==
- Badian, Ernst (2006). "Barsaentes". In Salazar, Christine F.; Landfester, Manfred; Gentry, Francis G. (eds.). Brill's New Pauly. Brill Online.
- Heckel, Waldemar (2006). Who's Who in the Age of Alexander the Great: Prosopography of Alexander's Empire. Blackwell Publishing.
- Heckel, Waldemar (2020). In the Path of Conquest: Resistance to Alexander the Great. Oxford University Press. ISBN 978-0190076689.
- Weiskopf, Michael (1989). "Bessos". In Yarshater, Ehsan (ed.). Encyclopædia Iranica. Vol. IV/2: Behruz–Bibliographies II. London and New York: Routledge & Kegan Paul. pp. 174–175. ISBN 978-0-71009-125-3.
