= Hindush =

Province of the Achaemenid Empire

Hindush 𐏃𐎡𐎯𐎢𐏁
- Satrapy of the Achaemenid Empire
- c. 513 BCE–c. 4th-century BCE
- Standard of Cyrus the Great

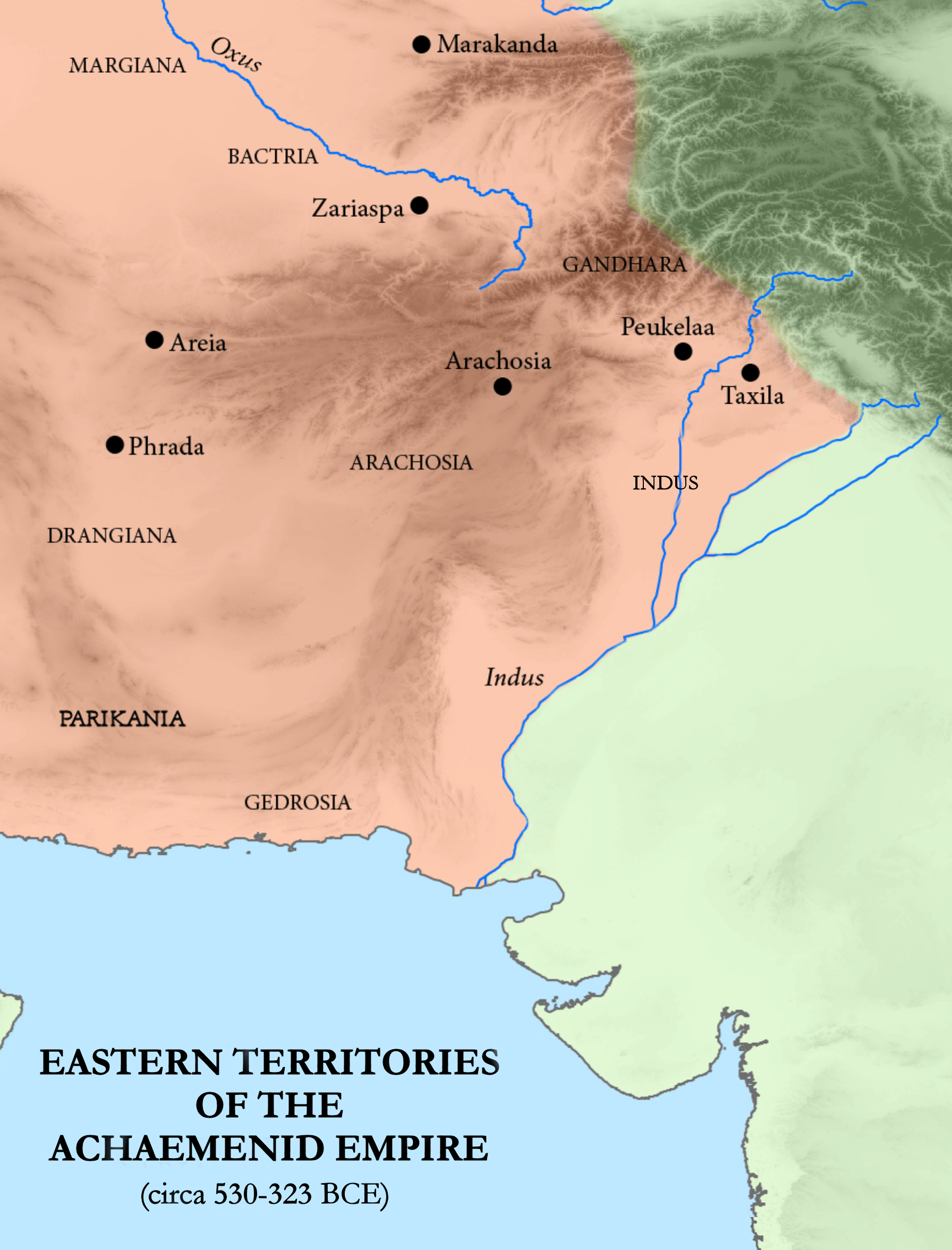
- Hiⁿdūš was part of the easternmost territories of the Achaemenid Empire
- Government
  - Type: Monarchy
- Monarchs
  - 513–499 BCE: Darius I (first)
  - 336–330 BCE: Darius III (last)
- History
  - Persian conquest of the Indus Valley: c. 513 BCE
  - Indian campaign of Alexander the Great: c. 4th-century BCE
Preceded by	Succeeded by
Sindhu-Sauvīra	Macedonian Empire

Hindush (Old Persian: 𐏃𐎡𐎯𐎢𐏁, romanized: Hi^{n}dūš) (Note: Transcribed as Hiⁿdūš because the nasal "n" before consonants was omitted in the Old Persian script, and simplified as Hindūš.) was an administrative division of the Achaemenid Empire in the lower Indus Valley. Established after the Achaemenid conquest of the Indus Valley in the 6th century BCE, it is believed to have existed as a province for approximately two centuries, until it fell to the Macedonian Empire during the Indian campaign of Alexander the Great. According to the Greek historian Herodotus, it was the "easternmost province" governed by the Achaemenid dynasty.

== Etymology ==
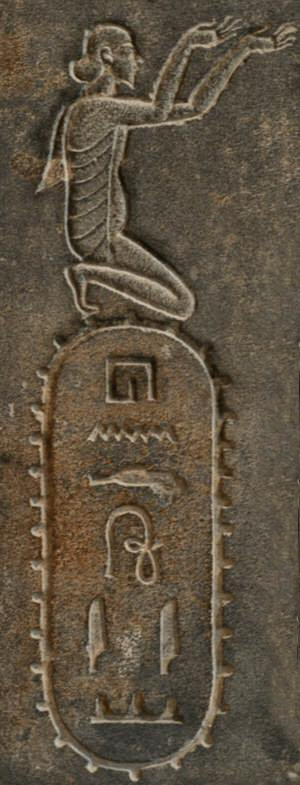
The word Hinduš inscribed on the Egyptian statue of Darius the Great: 𓉔𓈖𓂧𓍯𓇌𓈉 h-n-d-wꜣ-y Hiⁿdūš

Hindush was written in the Achaemenid royal inscriptions as Hidūsh (Old Persian cuneiform: 𐏃𐎡𐎯𐎢𐏁, H-i-du-u-š). It is also transliterated as Hi^{n}dūš since the nasal "n" before consonants was omitted in the Old Persian script, and simplified as Hindush.

It is widely accepted that the name Hindush derives from Sindhu, the Sanskrit name of the Indus River as well as the region at the lower Indus Basin. The Proto-Iranian sound change *s > h occurred between 850–600 BCE, according to Asko Parpola. The -sh suffix is common among the names of many Achaemenid provinces, such as Harauvatish (the land of Harauvati or Haraxvaiti, i.e., Arachosia) or Bakhtrish (Bactria). Accordingly, Hindush would mean the land of Sindhu.

The Greeks of Asia Minor, who were also part of the Achaemenid Empire, called the province 'India'. More precisely, they called the people of the province as 'Indians' ('Ινδοι, Indoi) The loss of the aspirate /h/ was probably due to the dialects of Greek spoken in Asia Minor. Herodotus also generalised the term "Indian" from the people of Hindush to all the people living to the east of Persia, even though he had no knowledge of the geography of the land.

== Geography ==
The territory of Hindush may have corresponded to the area covering the lower and central Indus Basin (present-day Sindh and the southern Punjab in Pakistan). Hindush bordered Gandāra (spelt as Gaⁿdāra by the Achaemenids) to the north. These areas remained under Persian control until the invasion by Alexander. Alternatively, some authors consider that Hindush may have been located in the Punjab region.

== People ==
Indian delegation bringing gifts, including gold dust and onager, relief from Apadana of Persepolis.

Representatives of Hindush are depicted as delegates bringing gifts to the king on the Apadana staircases, and as throne/ dais bearers on the Tripylon and Hall of One Hundred Columns reliefs at Persepolis. The representatives of Hindush (as well as Gandāra and Thatagush) in each instance are characterized by their loincloths, sandals, and exposed upper body, which distinguish them from the representatives of other eastern provinces such as Bactria and Arachosia. They are also depicted on the Achaemenid tombs of Naqsh-e Rostam and Persepolis.

=== In Achaemenid army ===
Hindush soldier of the Achaemenid army

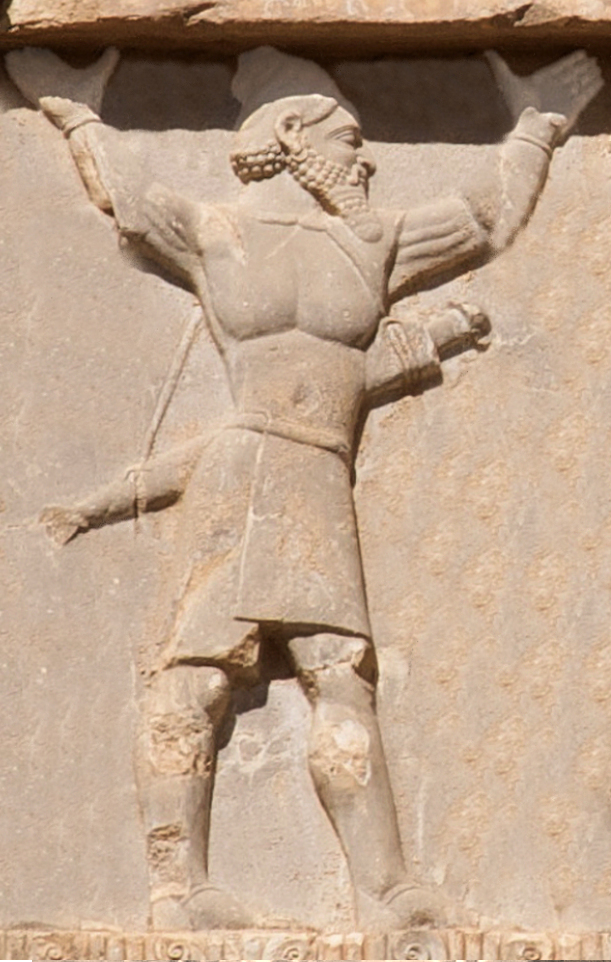
Xerxes I tomb, Hindush soldier of the Achaemenid army, circa 480 BCE.

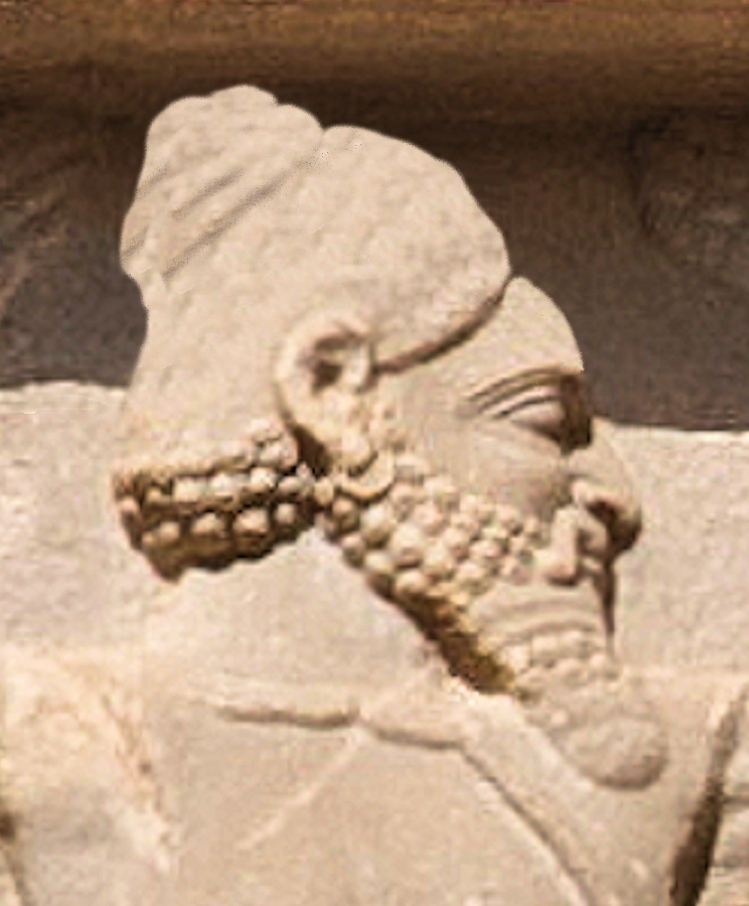
Xerxes I tomb, Hindush soldier circa 480 BCE (enhanced detail).

According to Herodotus, the 'Indians' participated to the Second Persian invasion of Greece circa 480 BCE. At the final Battle of Platea (479 BCE), they formed one of the main corps of Achaemenid troops (one of "the greatest of the nations"). Indians were still supplying troops and elephants for the Achaemenid army at the Battle of Gaugamela (331 BCE).

== Administration ==
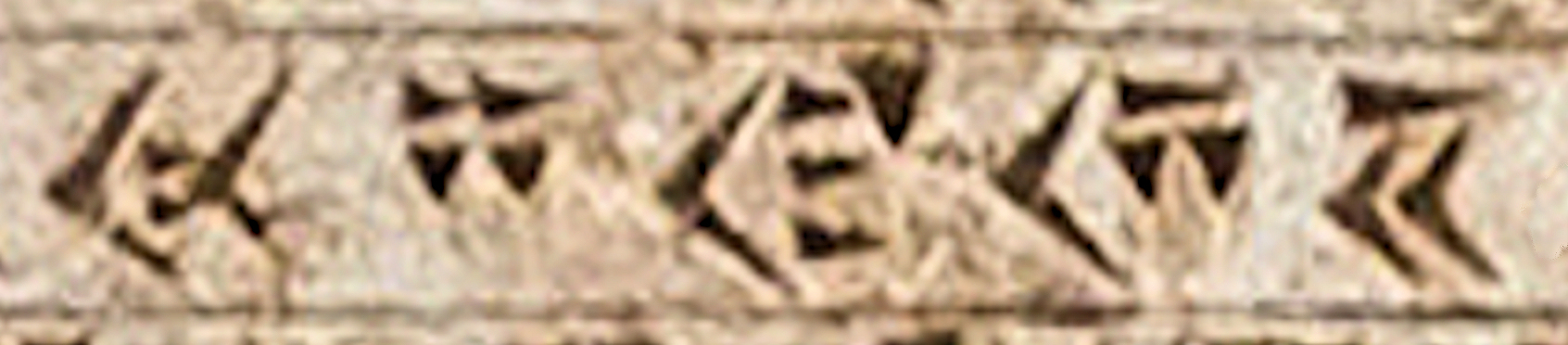
The name Hidūš (𐏃𐎡𐎯𐎢𐏁 in Old Persian cuneiform) as an Achaemenid territory in the DNa inscription of Darius the Great (c. 490 BC).

Like Gandāra, little is known about the Achaemenid administration of the satrapy. From the Persepolis Administrative Archives one Irdubama appears to have been in charge of issuing travelling permits to people from Hinduš to Persepolis and other provinces in 499/98 BCE, probably acting as satrap. However local dynasts remained important and by the time of the invasion of Alexander, rival potentates such as Sambus, Musicanus and Porticanus had risen to power. Of them Sambus (Indic Śambhu) ruled from Sindimana which was probably the capital of Hindush. He was apparently the main Achaemenid satrap as inferred from the fact that later Alexander appointed him to the position as well. After his rebellion and flight, Peithon, son of Agenor was appointed satrap by Alexander.

== See also ==
- India (Herodotus)
