= Sal Kalan =

- Village
- Location in Punjab, India Sal Kalan (India)
- Coordinates: 31.2247064°N 75.9722776°E
- Country: India
- State: Punjab
- District: Shaheed Bhagat Singh Nagar

Government
  - Type: Panchayat raj
  - Body: Gram panchayat
- Elevation: 251 m (823 ft)

Population (2011)
  - Total: 458
- Sex ratio 241/217 ♂/♀

Languages
  - Official: Punjabi
- Time zone: UTC+5:30 (IST)
- PIN: 144505
- Telephone code: 01884
- ISO 3166 code: IN-PB
- Post office: Banga (S.O)
- Website: nawanshahr.nic.in

Sal Kalan is a village in Shaheed Bhagat Singh Nagar district of Punjab State, India. It is located 6 kilometres (3.7 mi) away from sub post office Banga, 20 kilometres (12 mi) from Nawanshahr, 17.7 kilometres (11.0 mi) from district headquarter Shaheed Bhagat Singh Nagar and 110 kilometres (68 mi) from state capital Chandigarh. The village is administrated by Sarpanch an elected representative of the village.

== Demography ==
As of 2011, Sal Kalan has a total number of 100 houses and population of 458 of which 241 include are males while 217 are females according to the report published by Census India in 2011. The literacy rate of Sal Kalan is 81.44% higher than the state average of 75.84%. The population of children under the age of 6 years is 54 which is 11.79% of total population of Sal Kalan, and child sex ratio is approximately 1250 as compared to Punjab state average of 846.

Most of the people are from Schedule Caste which constitutes 58.08% of total population in Sal Kalan. The town does not have any Schedule Tribe population so far.

As per the report published by Census India in 2011, 154 people were engaged in work activities out of the total population of Sal Kalan which includes 132 males and 22 females. According to census survey report 2011, 81.17% workers describe their work as main work and 18.83% workers are involved in Marginal activity providing livelihood for less than 6 months.

== Education ==
The village has a Punjabi medium, co-ed primary school established in 1961. The school provide mid-day meal per Indian Midday Meal Scheme. As per Right of Children to Free and Compulsory Education Act the school provide free education to children between the ages of 6 and 14.

Amardeep Singh Shergill Memorial college Mukandpur, KC Engineering College and Doaba Khalsa Trust Group Of Institutions are the nearest colleges. Industrial Training Institute for women (ITI Nawanshahr) is 21 kilometres (13 mi). The village is 91 kilometres (57 mi) away from Chandigarh University, 67 kilometres (42 mi) from Indian Institute of Technology and 32 kilometres (20 mi) away from Lovely Professional University.

== Transport ==
Nawanshahr train station is the nearest train station however, Garhshankar Junction railway station is 22 kilometres (14 mi) away from the village. Sahnewal Airport is the nearest domestic airport which located 64 kilometres (40 mi) away in Ludhiana and the nearest international airport is located in Chandigarh also Sri Guru Ram Dass Jee International Airport is the second nearest airport which is 141 kilometres (88 mi) away in Amritsar.

== See also ==
- List of villages in India
