= Sambus (satrap) =

Sambus (other spellings of the name Sambos, Sabbas, Sabos, Sabeilo and probably Samaxus; Indic Śambhu) was the satrap and ruler of Sindimana in the Achaemenid province of Hindush (lower Indus Valley) at the time of the invasion of Alexander the Great. He may have been the main Achaemenid satrap in Hindush at the time as indicated by his later appointment on the position by Alexander although rival rulers such as Musicanus and Porticanus/Oxycanus existed.

According to P. H. L. Eggermont, Sambus is probably the same figure erroneously called Samaxus by Quintus Curtius Rufus. He had earlier fought against the Macedonians at the Battle of Gaugamela with Barsaentes, the satrap of Arachosia. After the death of Achaemenid pretender Bessus he joined Barsaentes' rebellion but both were soon captured by the Macedonians, or per a different version, Sambus betrayed Barsaentes and handed him over to Alexander at Hydaspes, who put him to death.

Sambus was appointed satrap of "Hill Indians" (probably Kirthar Mountains) by Alexander. But when Alexander reinstated Musicanus, his rival, he rebelled against the Macedonians; his rebellion is said to have been instigated by Brahmins. Upon the approach of Alexander he fled with thirty elephants to east, and Alexander entered Sindimana unopposed as his family opened gates of the city to Alexander. According to Diodorus Siculus, Alexander massacred over eighty thousand people including Brahmins in the territory of Sambus for rebelling. Nothing further is known about him.
