= P. L. Gupta =

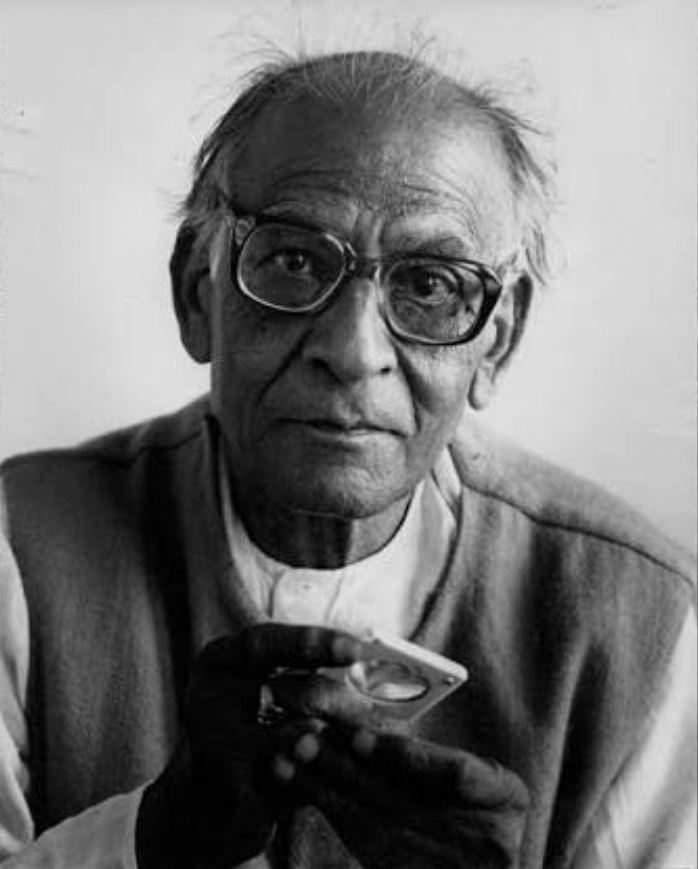
Dr. P. L. Gupta

Parmeshwari Lal Gupta (P. L. Gupta) (1914 – 2001) was an Indian numismatist who collated previous research on Indian Numismatics in the post-Independence era.

His collated work was published as 'COINS', a book by the National Book Trust in 1969.

== Early life and education ==
Born on 24 December 1914 in Azamgarh in the United Provinces of Agra and Oudh, his education took place at Wesley High School in his hometown. His education was disrupted as he was expelled from his school in 1930 for joining a local political agitation. He turned to Hindi journalism for local newspapers. During this period, he was introduced to the study of Indian Numismatics by an acquaintance, Adv. Rama Shankar Rawat, a local collector of Indian antiquities. He soon pursued a Masters in Ancient Indian History & Culture at the Banaras Hindu University, Varanasi after finishing his Intermediate and B.A. at the same university.

== Career in museums and numismatics ==
After completing his Masters at Banaras Hindu University, Gupta worked as an Assistant Curator at the Bharat Kala Bhavan from 1950 till 1954. During this period, he began pursuing his doctoral studies on Punch-marked coins of ancient India under Prof. V. S. Agrawala's guidance. He got his doctorate in the subject based on his thesis in 1960 while working as the Curator of Numismatics at Bombay's Prince of Wales Museum which he joined in 1955 and worked until 1962. Later, he joined the Patna Museum in 1963 and worked there until 1972. Later, he joined the Indian Institute of Research in Numismatic Studies, Anjaneri, Nasik as its first director in 1980.
