= Atari (name) =

Atari may refer to the following people

Given name

- Atari Bigby (born 1981), American football player

Surname

- Ahmed Atari (born 1994), Qatari swimmer
- Gali Atari (born 1953), Israeli singer and actress, sister of Yona and Shosh
- Kousuke Atari (born 1980), Japanese singer
- Shosh Atari (1949–2008), Israeli radio personality, sister of Gali and Yona
- Yona Atari (1933–2019), Israeli singer and actress, sister of Shosh and Gali
