= Antiquities Trafficking and Heritage Anthropology Research Project =

The Antiquities Trafficking and Heritage Anthropology Research Project (ATHAR) consists of a group of experts that conduct research on the looting and trafficking of antiquities.

The Arab Spring and the ensuing wars created opportunities for traffickers in the Middle East to loot archeological sites with impunity. Social media allowed anyone with a smart phone to sell the looted antiquities. Much of the trade takes place on Facebook.
