= Athar Ali (disambiguation) =

Athar Ali (1891–1976) was a Bangladeshi Islamic activist, author, teacher, and politician.

Athar Ali may also refer to:

- Athar Ali (politician) (born 1961), Pakistani Norwegian politician
- Athar Ali (scientist) (1963–2003), Pakistani system engineer and rocket scientist
- M. Athar Ali (1925–1998), Indian historian of Medieval Indian History
