= Jandiala, SBS Nagar =

Jandiala
- Village
- Location in Punjab, India Jandiala (India)
- Coordinates: 31.225891°N 75.9547155°E
- Country: India
- State: Punjab
- District: Shaheed Bhagat Singh Nagar

Government
  - Type: Panchayat raj
  - Body: Gram panchayat
- Elevation: 251 m (823 ft)

Population (2011)
  - Total: 1,893
- Sex ratio 940/953 ♂/♀

Languages
  - Official: Punjabi
- Time zone: UTC+5:30 (IST)
- PIN: 144505
- Telephone code: 01823
- ISO 3166 code: IN-PB
- Post office: Banga
- Website: nawanshahr.nic.in

Jandiala is a village in Shaheed Bhagat Singh Nagar district of Punjab State, India. It is located 7 kilometres (4.3 mi) away from postal head office Banga, 21 kilometres (13 mi) from Nawanshahr, 18.6 kilometres (11.6 mi) from district headquarter Shaheed Bhagat Singh Nagar and 111 kilometres (69 mi) from state capital Chandigarh. The village is administrated by Sarpanch an elected representative of the village.

== Demography ==
As of 2011, Jandiala has a total number of 385 houses and a population of 1893 of which 940 include are males while 953 are females according to the report published by Census India in 2011. The literacy rate of Jandiala is 75.67%, lower than the state average of 75.84%. The population of children under the age of 6 years is 179 which is 9.46% of the total population of Jandiala, and child sex ratio is approximately 967 as compared to Punjab state average of 846.

Most of the people are from Schedule Caste which constitutes 69.68% of the total population in Jandiala. The town does not have any Schedule Tribe population so far.

As per the report published by Census India in 2011, 569 people were engaged in work activities out of the total population of Jandiala which includes 516 males and 53 females. According to census survey report 2011, 79.61% of workers describe their work as main work and 20.39% workers are involved in Marginal activity providing livelihood for less than 6 months.

== Education ==
The village has a Punjabi medium, co-ed upper primary school founded in 1953. The school provide mid-day meal and free education to children between the ages of 6 and 14 as per Right of Children to Free and Compulsory Education Act.

Guru Nanak College of Nursing, Amardeep Singh Shergill Memorial college Mukandpur and Sikh National College Banga are the nearest colleges. and Lovely Professional University is 30 kilometres (19 mi) away from the village.

== Transport ==
Banga railway station is the nearest train station however, Phagwara Junction railway station is 22 kilometres (14 mi) away from the village. Sahnewal Airport is the nearest domestic airport which located 72 kilometres (45 mi) away in Ludhiana and the nearest international airport is located in Chandigarh also Sri Guru Ram Dass Jee International Airport is the second nearest airport which is 139 kilometres (86 mi) away in Amritsar.

== See also ==
- List of villages in India
