= Athar Mahmood =

Pakistani diplomat

Athar Mahmood at his farewell reception in Prague, Czech Republic, June 2010

Athar Mahmood (18 February 1952- 14 September 2013) was a career diplomat for the Government of Pakistan. He was posted as Ambassador of Pakistan to Mauritius, Czech Republic and Tunisia as well as serving in the Foreign Office in Islamabad. He earned the title of Ambassador Extraordinary and Plenipotentiary during his career.

== Career ==
=== Pakistani foreign office ===
In the foreign office he served as Additional Secretariat for Europe. In 2005, Athar Mahmood made a strong demarche to the ambassadors of Belgium, the European Union and the Netherlands in Pakistan. It was made concerning an incident whereby the European Parliament refused to meet Maulana Samiul Haq, who was part of the eight-member delegation of the Senate Standing Committee on Foreign Affairs, while visiting Europe. He chaired the third meeting of the Russian-Pakistani Counter terrorism Working Group in Moscow, 2006. The meeting elaborated on the anti terror measures by the Pakistan and Russian governments in accordance with the United Nations.

=== Missions abroad ===
During his time as ambassador to Mauritius he hosted a week-long Pakistani Trade Fair in Mauritius. The trade fair exhibited Pakistani products such as pharmaceuticals, textiles, spices, rice, sports wear and furniture. The fair served as a platform to increase bi lateral trade between the two countries

In 2010 he was posted to Tunisia, his final posting as ambassador. In the 2011 Libya crisis, he was part of a task force to return Pakistanis working in Libya back to Pakistan via chartered flights

=== Pakistan embassy in Czech Republic ===
In 2006 he was appointed by the government of Pakistan to reopen their embassy in Prague, Czech Republic. He was chosen for the position due to his previous experience as Additional secretary Europe and European affairs.

In 2007 he took the Czech prime minister on an official visit to Pakistan; this was the first ever visit by a prime minister from the Czech Republic to Pakistan. Prime Minister of the Czech Republic, Mirek Topolanek, paid an official visit to Pakistan in May 2007. The goals of the visit were to promote bilateral relations. The Prime Minister's entourage included ministers of industry and trade and culture, senior government officials and several businessmen.

During his posting, he boosted trade and cultural exchange between the two countries.

== Family ==
Athar Mahmood was married to Nafisa Athar, granddaughter of Mian Abdul Hayee First Education Minister of Pakistan. They have two daughters, Sahar Mahmood and Arjumand Mahmood.

== Interests ==
He had varied interests which include painting and writing. Art exhibitions of his paintings have been held in galleries around Pakistan.
