= Athari (surname) =

Athari is a surname. Notable people with the surname include:

- Aristotle Athari (born 1991), American actor and comedian
- Farzan Athari (born 1984), Iranian-Swedish model, actor, and TV host
- Mashallah ibn Athari (c. 740–815), Persian astrologer, astronomer, and mathematician
