= Mallian people =

Ethnic Group

Mallian people (Ancient Greek: Μάλλοι) were a tribe from modern day central Punjab, with capital at today's Multan city, south of the confluence of the Jhelum (Hydaspes) and Ravi, (Hydraotes) rivers. They confronted Alexander the Great during his Mallian campaign in 326 BC. They are mentioned by ancient Greek historians during the campaign of Alexander.

== Mallian campaign ==
After the mutiny of his army at river Beas, Alexander moved southward. Hearing this news, Mallians started making preparations for war. According to Greek reports they had gathered a total of 90,000 foot, 10,000 horse and 900 chariots. However, Alexander advanced quickly than expectations of the Mallians and reached before they could flee. Many of them were massacred and rest fled to the Mallian capital, Multan.

=== Siege of Multan ===
Alexander besieged the city after arriving there some days later. When it prolonged, he leaped into the city before the Greek army could through ladders and even succeeded in killing the Mallian leader, however, he became injured by an arrow which struck him in the lungs. When Greeks became aware of it, they became furious thinking that Alexander had been killed, and started killing every Mallian in the city.

== Aftermath ==
Alexander received the final submission of the Malli, who had submitted after the capture of their capital city. He sent their ambassadors away, and they returned later with 300 four horse chariots. In addition to this, Alexander also received 1,000 Indian shields, a number of lions and 100 talents.

It is unclear what happened to the Mallian tribe after the campaign of Alexander. It is thought that they continued to occupy modern-day Multan in Punjab, during the Indo-Greek occupation of Punjab.
