= Atari, Pakistan =

Atari
- Location within Pakistan
- Coordinates: 30°26′53″N 71°57′4″E
- Country: Pakistan
- Province: Punjab (Pakistan)
- District: Khanewal
- Elevation: 252 m (827 ft)
- Time zone: UTC+5 (PST)

Atari is a town of Khanewal District in the Punjab province of Pakistan. It is located at 30°26'53N 71°57'4E at an altitude of 252 metres (830 ft) and lies 20 km west-south-west of Tulamba.

== History ==
The town of Atari is located near to a ruined fortress, once evidently of great strength, and was identified by Alexander Cunningham with the city of the Brahmans, the third city taken by Alexander the Great in his invasion of India and its subsequent merger into the Hellenic Empire. The citadel is 750 feet (230 m) square and 35 feet (11 m) high, surrounded by a ditch now almost undistinguishable, and having a central tower 50 feet (15 m) in height. On two sides stretch the remains of an ancient town, forming a massive mound covered with huge bricks, whose size attests their great antiquity. No tradition exists as to the origin or history of these remains, and the name of the old city is unknown.
