= Heon, SBS Nagar =

Heon
- Village
- Location in Punjab, India Heon (India)
- Coordinates: 31.2145538°N 75.9600253°E
- Country: India
- State: Punjab
- District: Shaheed Bhagat Singh Nagar

Government
  - Type: Panchayat raj
  - Body: Gram panchayat
- Elevation: 251 m (823 ft)

Population (2011)
  - Total: 2,616
- Sex ratio 1314/1302 ♂/♀

Languages
  - Official: Punjabi
- Time zone: UTC+5:30 (IST)
- PIN: 144505
- Telephone code: 01884
- ISO 3166 code: IN-PB
- Post office: Banga
- Website: nawanshahr.nic.in

Heon is a village in Shaheed Bhagat Singh Nagar district of Punjab State, India. It is located 4.6 kilometres (2.9 mi) away from postal head office Banga, 18.6 kilometres (11.6 mi) from Nawanshahr, 16.2 kilometres (10.1 mi) from district headquarter Shaheed Bhagat Singh Nagar and 108 kilometres (67 mi) from state capital Chandigarh. The village is administrated by Sarpanch an elected representative of the village.

== Demography ==
As of 2011, Heon has a total number of 585 houses and population of 2616 of which 1314 include are males while 1302 are females according to the report published by Census India in 2011. The literacy rate of Heon is 78.25%, higher than the state average of 75.84%. The population of children under the age of 6 years is 234 which is 8.95% of total population of Heon, and child sex ratio is approximately 857 as compared to Punjab state average of 846.

Most of the people are from Schedule Caste which constitutes 69.95% of total population in Heon. The town does not have any Schedule Tribe population so far.

As per the report published by Census India in 2011, 794 people were engaged in work activities out of the total population of Heon which includes 720 males and 70 females. According to census survey report 2011, 76.53% workers describe their work as main work and 23.47% workers are involved in Marginal activity providing livelihood for less than 6 months.

== Education ==
The village has a Punjabi medium, co-ed upper primary school founded in 1996. The school provide mid-day meal and free education to children between the ages of 6 and 14 as per Right of Children to Free and Compulsory Education Act.

Guru Nanak College of Nursing, Amardeep Singh Shergill Memorial college Mukandpur and Sikh National College Banga are the nearest colleges. and Lovely Professional University is 35 kilometres (22 mi) away from the village.

== Landmarks ==
Gurudwara Dehra Sahib, Gurudwara Baba Jawahar Singh Ji Raja Sahib, Sai Nathu Shah Ji and Sidh Shri Baba Balak Nath Ji are religious sites. The village has a bank and ATM facility.

== Transport ==
Banga railway station is the nearest train station however, Garhshankar Junction railway station is 20.8 kilometres (12.9 mi) away from the village. Sahnewal Airport is the nearest domestic airport which located 63 kilometres (39 mi) away in Ludhiana and the nearest international airport is located in Chandigarh also Sri Guru Ram Dass Jee International Airport is the second nearest airport which is 143 kilometres (89 mi) away in Amritsar.

== See also ==
- List of villages in India
