= Atari, Nawanshahr =

Atari
- Village
- Location in Punjab, India Atari (India)
- Coordinates: 31.2477595°N 75.9912505°E
- Country: India
- State: Punjab
- District: Shaheed Bhagat Singh Nagar

Government
  - Type: Panchayat raj
  - Body: Gram panchayat
- Elevation: 254 m (833 ft)

Population (2011)
  - Total: 628
- Sex ratio 316/312 ♂/♀

Languages
  - Official: Punjabi
- Time zone: UTC+5:30 (IST)
- PIN: 144510
- Telephone code: 01824
- ISO 3166 code: IN-PB
- Post office: Ladhana Jhikka
- Website: nawanshahr.nic.in

Atari is a village in Shaheed Bhagat Singh Nagar district of Punjab State, India. It is located 6.4 kilometres (4.0 mi) away from postal head office Ladhana Jhikka, 8.2 kilometres (5.1 mi) from Banga, 22 kilometres (14 mi) from district headquarter Shaheed Bhagat Singh Nagar and 112 kilometres (70 mi) from state capital Chandigarh. The village is administrated by Sarpanch an elected representative of the village.

== Demography ==
As of 2011, Atari has a total number of 129 houses and a population of 628 of which 316 include are males while 312 are females according to the report published by Census India in 2011. The literacy rate of Atari is 72.92%, lower than the state average of 85.26%. The population of children under the age of 6 years is 58 which is 9.24% of total population of Atari, and child sex ratio is approximately 871 as compared to Punjab state average of 846.

Most of the people are from Schedule Caste which constitutes 63.38% of total population in Atari. The town does not have any Schedule Tribe population so far.

As per the report published by Census India in 2011, 236 people were engaged in work activities out of the total population of Atari which includes 200 males and 36 females. According to census survey report 2011, 85.59% workers describe their work as main work and 14.41% workers are involved in Marginal activity providing livelihood for less than 6 months.

== Education ==
The village has a Punjabi medium, co-ed primary school founded in 1964. The schools provide mid-day meal which prepared in School premises as per Indian Midday Meal Scheme. The school provide free education to children between the ages of 6 and 14 as per Right of Children to Free and Compulsory Education Act.

Amardeep Singh Shergill Memorial college Mukandpur and Sikh National College Banga. Lovely Professional University is 42 kilometres (26 mi) away from the village.

== Transport ==
Banga railway station is the nearest train station however, Phagwara Junction railway station is 30 kilometres (19 mi) away from the village. Sahnewal Airport is the nearest domestic airport which located 66 kilometres (41 mi) away in Ludhiana and the nearest international airport is located in Chandigarh also Sri Guru Ram Dass Jee International Airport is the second nearest airport which is 146 kilometres (91 mi) away in Amritsar.

== See also ==
- List of villages in India
