= Gandāra =

Achaemenid province

Achaemenid Gandhāra 𐎥𐎭𐎠𐎼 Gaⁿdāra (Old Persian)
- Satrapy of the Achaemenid Empire
- c. 500 BCE–c. 330 BCE
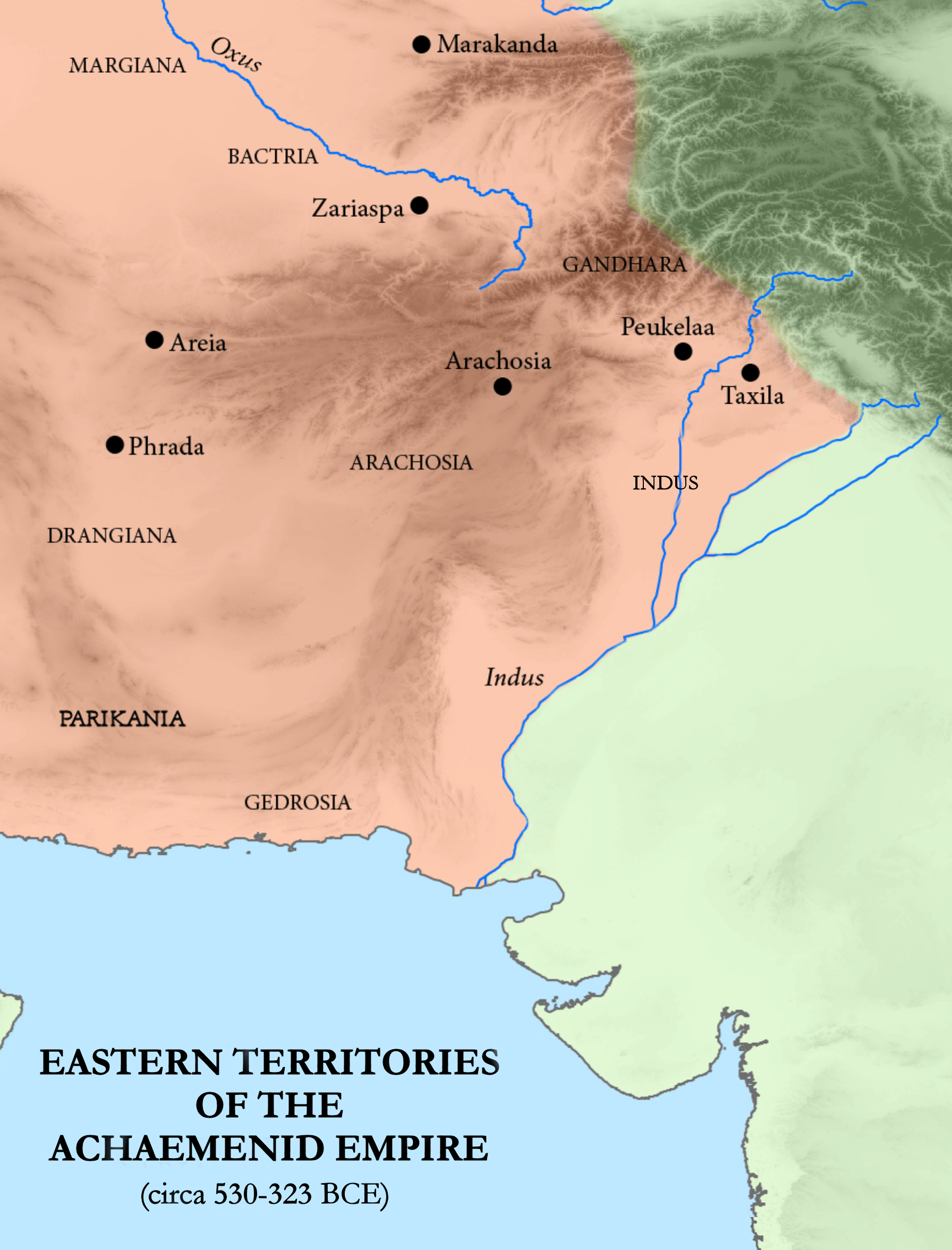
- Gandāra was the easternmost territory of the Achaemenid Empire
- Government
  - Type: monarchy
- King of Kings
  - c. 535–530 BCE: Cyrus II (first)
  - 359/8–338 BCE: Artaxerxes III (last)
- Historical era: Achaemenid era
  - Achaemenid conquest of the Indus Valley: c. 500 BCE
  - Disestablished: August/September c. 330 BCE
Preceded by
Gandhāra
Succeeded by
Kingdom of Taxiles
Peucelaotis
Kingdom of Abisares
Kingdom of Assacani

Gandāra, or Gadāra in Achaemenid inscriptions (Old Persian cuneiform: 𐎥𐎭𐎠𐎼, Gadāra, also transliterated as Gaⁿdāra since the nasal "n" before consonants was omitted in the Old Persian script, and simplified as Gandāra or sometimes Gandara) was one of the easternmost provinces of the Achaemenid Empire in South Asia, following the Achaemenid invasion of the Indus Valley. It appears in various Achaemenid royal inscriptions such as the Behistun inscription and the DNa inscription of Darius the Great.

The province, or at least its western portion, was also referred to as Para-uparisaina (Ancient Greek: Παροπαμισάδαι, Paropamisádai; Latin: Paropamisadae) in the Babylonian and Elamite versions of the Behistun inscription. The extent of the province was apparently wider than the region of Gandhara.

== History ==
=== Gandhara before the Achaemenid conquest ===
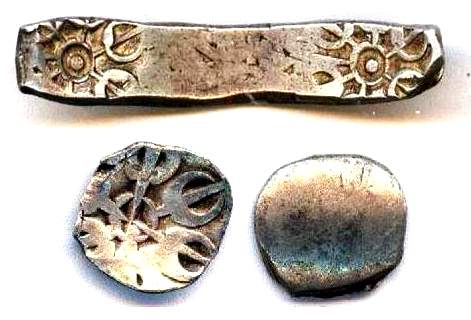
Coins of Gandhāra, a janapada: AR Shatamana and one-eighth Shatamana (round), Taxila-Gandhara region, c. 600–300 BCE.

During the 6th century BCE, Gandhāra was an important mahajanapada in north-west Iron Age South Asia, with the other states of the Punjab region, such as the Kekayas, Madrakas, Uśīnaras, and Shivis being under Gandhārī suzerainty. The Gandhārī king Pukkusāti, who reigned around mid 6th century BCE, engaged in expansionist ventures which brought him into conflict with the king Pradyota of the rising power of Avanti. Pukkusāti was successful in this struggle with Pradyota, but war broke out between him and the Pāṇḍava tribe located in the Punjab region, and who were threatened by his expansionist policy. Pukkusāti also had friendly relations with the king Bimbisāra of Magadha.

=== Achaemenid conquest ===
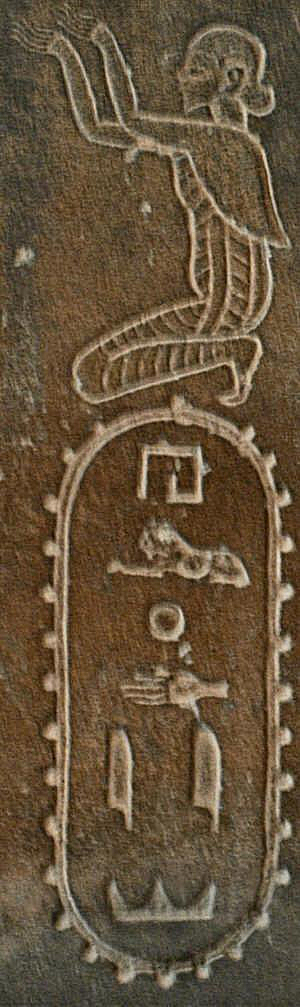
The word Gandāra inscribed on the Egyptian statue of Darius the Great: 𓉔𓃭𓐍𓂧𓇌𓈉 h-rw-ḫ-d-y Gaⁿdāra

By the late 6th century BCE, the founder of the Persian Achaemenid Empire, Cyrus, soon after his conquests of Media, Lydia, and Babylonia, marched into Gandhara and annexed it into his empire.

The scholar Kaikhosru Danjibuoy Sethna advanced that Cyrus had conquered only the trans-Indus borderlands around Peshawar which had belonged to Gandhāra while Pukkusāti remained a powerful king who maintained his rule over the rest of Gandhāra and the western Punjab. However, according to the scholar Buddha Prakash, Pukkusāti might have acted as a bulwark against the expansion of the Persian Achaemenid Empire into north-west South Asia. This hypothesis posits that the army which Nearchus claimed Cyrus had lost in Gedrosia had in fact been defeated by Pukkusāti's Gandhārī kingdom. Therefore, following Prakash's position, the Achaemenids would have been able to conquer Gandhāra only after a period of decline of Gandhāra after the reign of Pukkusāti, combined with the growth of Achaemenid power under the kings Cambyses II and Darius I.

However, the presence of Gandhāra, referred to as Gandāra in Old Persian, among the list of Achaemenid provinces in Darius's Behistun inscription confirms that his empire had inherited this region from conquests carried out earlier by Cyrus, with the annexation under Cyrus being limited to Gandhāra proper, after which the peoples of the Punjab region previously under Gandhārī authority took advantage of the new power vacuum to form their own small states.

=== Achaemenid period ===
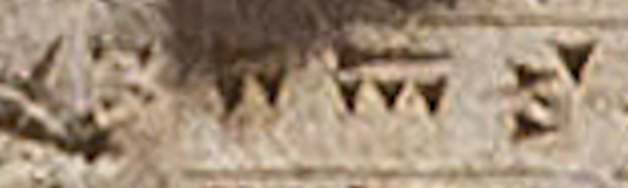
The name Gadāra (𐎥𐎭𐎠𐎼 in Old Persian cuneiform) in the DNa inscription of Darius the Great (circa 500 BCE).

The satrapy of Gandāra, with its capital at Puṣkalāvatī (present-day Charsadda), was established in the general region of the old Gandhara grave culture. During Achaemenid rule, the Kharosthi alphabet, derived from the one used for Aramaic (the official language of Achaemenids), developed here and remained the regional script of Gandhāra until 200 CE.

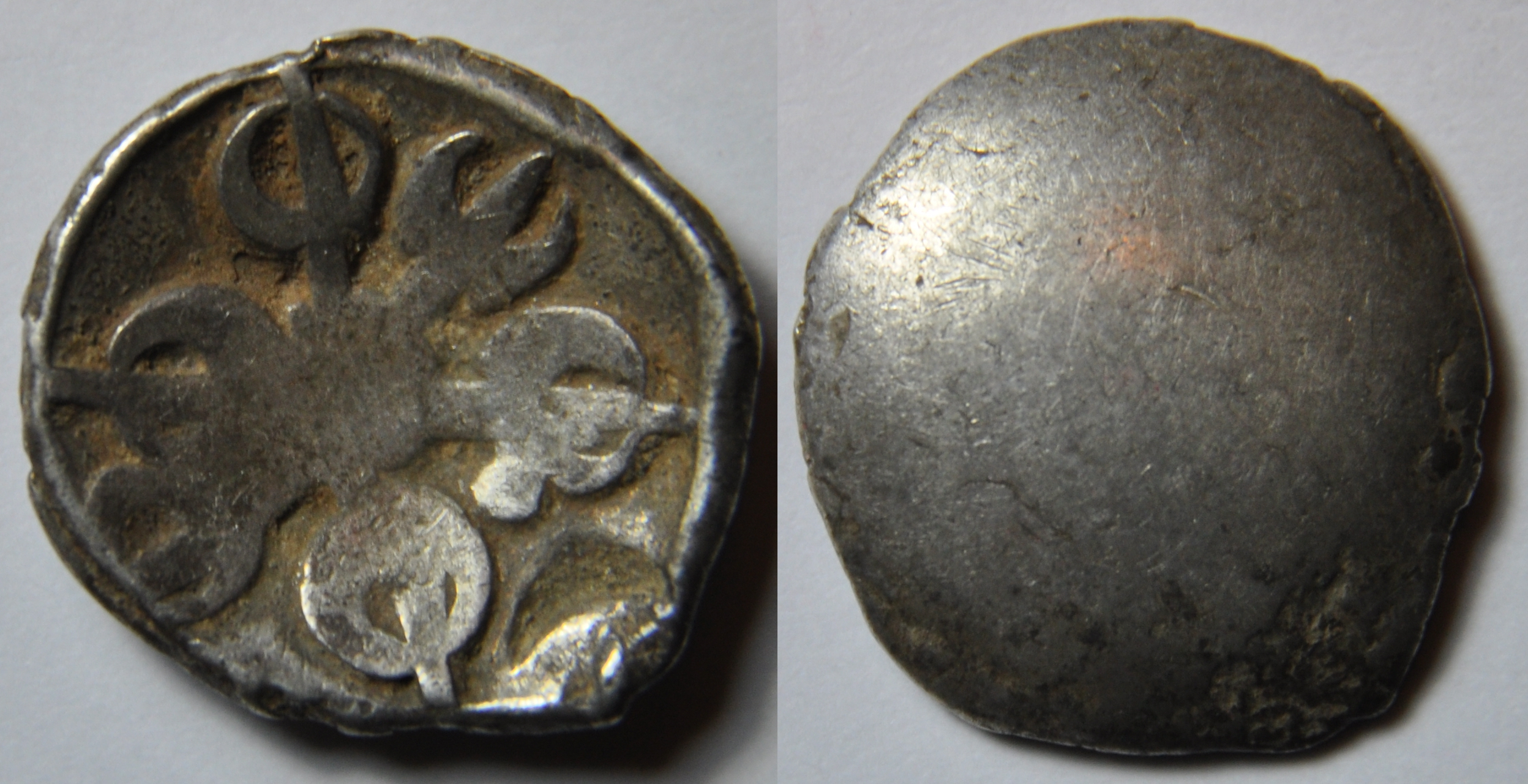
A monetary silver coin of the satrapy of Gandhara about 500–400 BCE. Obv: Gandhara symbol representing 6 weapons with one point between two weapons; At the bottom of the point, a hollow moon. Rev: Empty. Dimensions: 14 mm Weight: 1.4 g.

The inscription on Darius' (521–486 BCE) tomb at Naqsh-e Rostam near Persepolis records Gadāra (Gandāra) along with Hindush (Hənduš) in the list of satrapies. By about 380 BC the Persian hold on the region had weakened. Many small kingdoms sprang up in Gandhara.

=== Macedonian conquest ===
In 327 BCE, Alexander the Great conquered Gandhara as well as the Indian satrapies of the Persian Empire. The expeditions of Alexander were recorded by his court historians and by Arrian (around 175 CE) in his Anabasis Alexandri and by other chroniclers several centuries after the event.

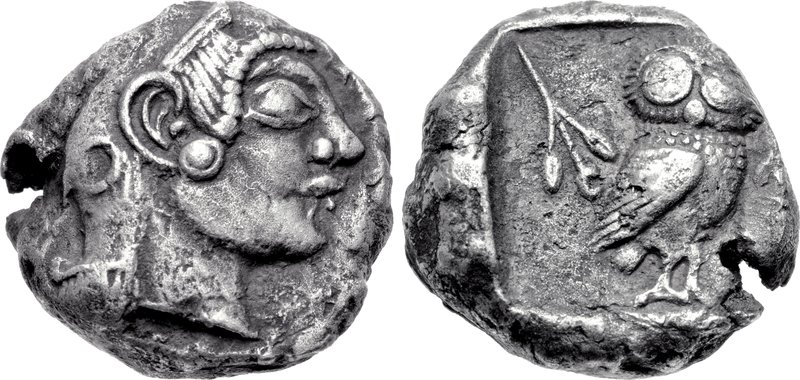
Athens coin (c. 500/490–485 BCE) discovered in Pushkalavati. This coin is the earliest known example of its type to be found so far east. Such coins were circulating in the area as currency, at least as far as the Indus, during the reign of the Achaemenids.

In the winter of 327 BCE, Alexander invited all the chieftains in the Indus Valley to submit to his authority. Omphis, then ruler of Taxila, but the remaining tribes and clans rejected Alexander's offer.

The first tribe Macedonians encountered were the Aspasioi tribe of the Kunar Valley, who initiated a fierce battle against Alexander, in which he himself was wounded in the shoulder by a dart. However, the Aspasioi eventually lost and 40,000 people were enslaved. Alexander then continued in a southwestern direction where he encountered the Assakenoi tribe of the Swat Valley in April 326 BCE. The Assakenoi fought bravely and offered stubborn resistance to Alexander and his army in the cities of Ora, Bazira and Massaga. So enraged was Alexander about the resistance put up by the Assakenoi that he massacred the entire population of Massaga and reduced its buildings to rubble. A similar slaughter then followed at Ora, another stronghold of the Assakenoi. The stories of these slaughters reached other Assakenians, who began fleeing to Aornos, a hill-fort located between Shangla and Kohistan. Alexander followed close behind their heels and besieged the strategic hill-fort, eventually capturing and destroying the fort and killing everyone inside. The remaining smaller tribes either surrendered or like the Astanenoi were quickly neutralized where 38,000 soldiers and 230,000 oxen were captured by Alexander. With the conquest of Gandhāra complete, Alexander switched to strengthening his military supply line, which by now stretched dangerously vulnerable over the Hindu Kush back to Balkh in Bactria. Alexander nominated officers as satraps of the new provinces, and in Gandhara, Oxyartes was nominated to the position of Satrap in 326 BCE.

== Administration ==
Gandāran delegation bringing gifts, including lances and zebu, Apadana, c. 520 BCE–c. 485 BCE.

Very little has survived regarding the Achaemenid administration of the satrapy of Gandāra. According to Bruno Jacobs, by the time of the arrival of Alexander, two main centres seem to have been established in the province. One was in Paropamisus in the west where Alexander established Alexandria in the Caucasus and installed his own satrap. Second was located to further east centred around Puṣkalāvatī (Peucelaotis), and appears to have been ruled by an indigenous family under Achaemenids. One Irdatakma is known from Persepolis Administrative Archives to have sent 100 zebu cattle from Gandāra to the queen Artystone; he was apparently the highest administrator or satrap in the province.

Astis (reconstructed Indo-Aryan name Hasti) was the last, and the only known, satrap of Gandāra. He resisted the Macedonians and perished during the siege and fall of Peucelaotis, with Sangaeus (Sangaja 'victory'), another local noble, being appointed in his place. Other dynasts are also mentioned: Sisikottus (Śaśigupta 'moon-protected') who fought in Bactria for Basseus and later acted as hyparch of Alexander over Assaceni; Assaceni chiefs Assagetes (Aśvajit) and Assacenus, and Copheus, etc., at the time of the Greek invasion.

== In Achaemenid army ==
Gandāra soldier of the Achaemenid army

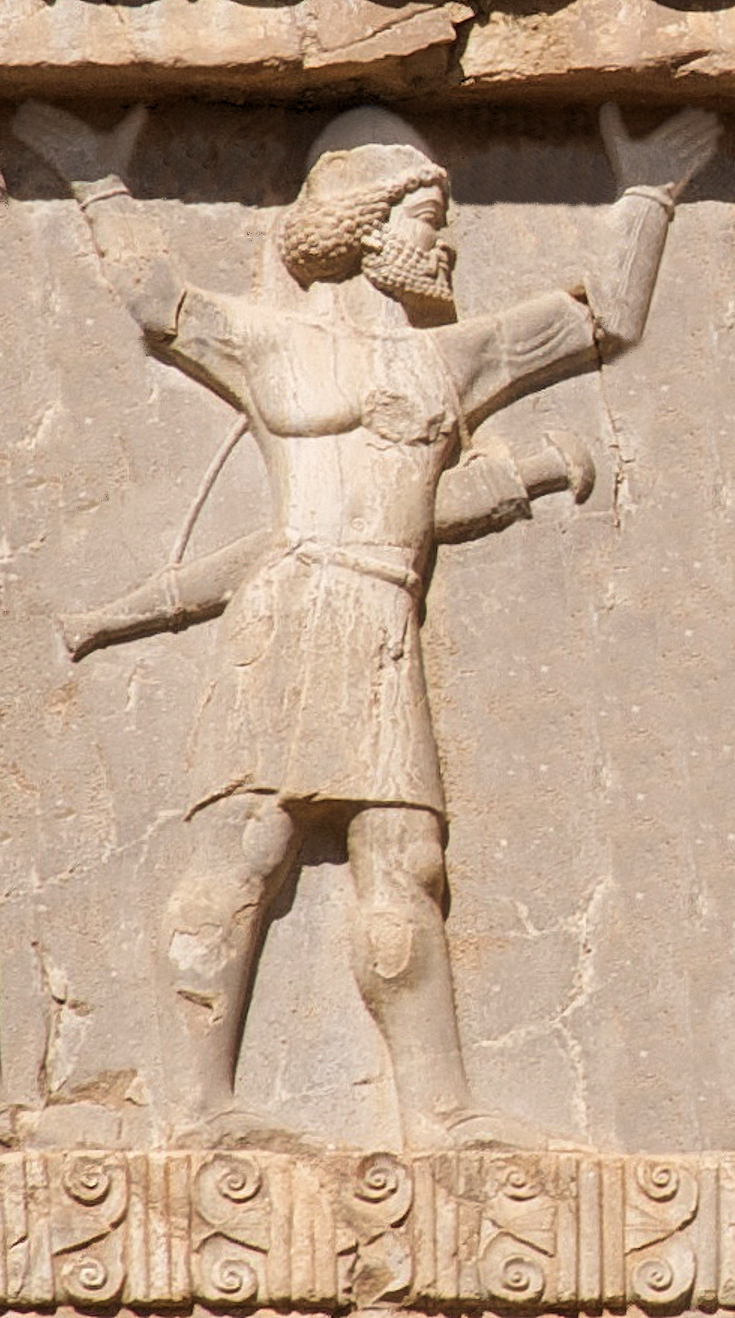
Xerxes I tomb, Gandāra soldier, circa 470 BC.

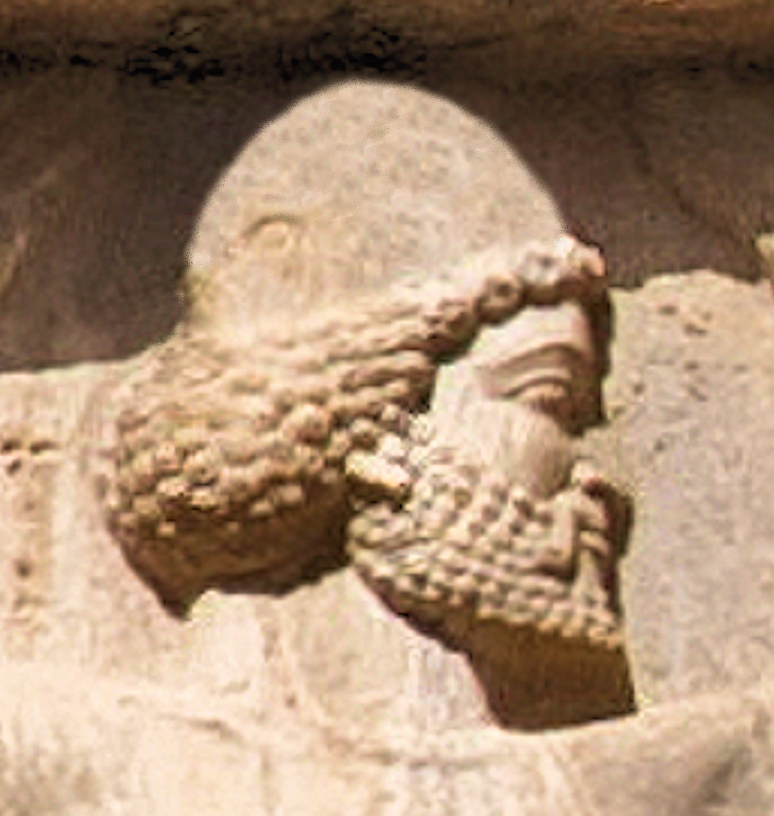
Xerxes I tomb, Gandāra soldier, circa 470 BC (detail).

According to Herodotus, soldiers of Gandāra participated to the Second Persian invasion of Greece around 480 BC. They had a different equipment from the Hindush, rather akin to that of the Bactrians, and were under the command of Artyphius, son of Artabanus:

The Bactrians in the army wore a headgear most like to the Median, carrying their native bows of reed, and short spears. (...) The Parthians, Chorasmians, Sogdians, Gandarians, and Dadicae in the army had the same equipment as the Bactrians. The Parthians and Chorasmians had for their commander Artabazus son of Pharnaces, the Sogdians Azanes son of Artaeus, the Gandarians and Dadicae Artyphius son of Artabanus.

— Herodotus VII 64-66

The depiction of Indian soldiers and the names of the three provinces of Gandāra, Hinduš and Sattagydia still appear in trilingual cuneiform labels above their respective figures on the tomb of Artaxerxes II (c. 358 BCE).

== See also ==
- India (Herodotus)
