= Cophen campaign =

Military campaign by Alexander the Great (327–326 BCE)

Alexander's Indian campaign
- Part of Indian campaign of Alexander the Great
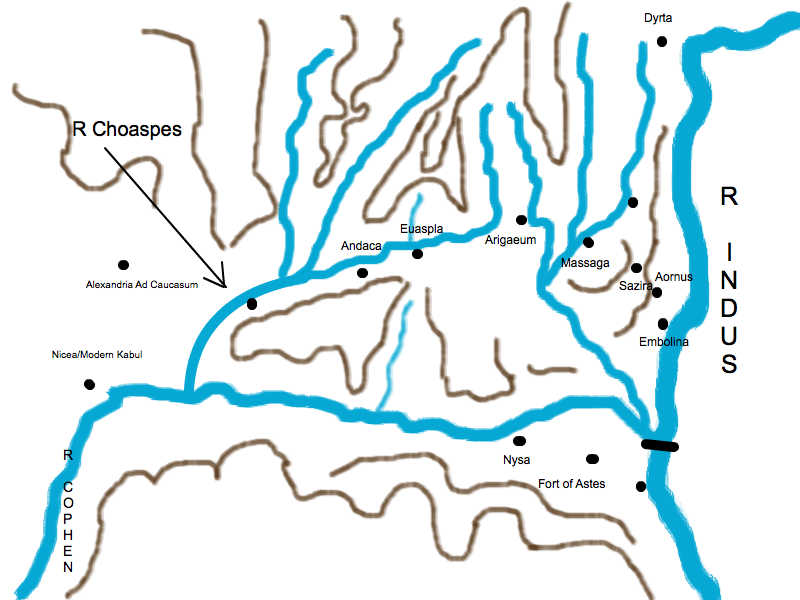
- The Valley of the Cophen
Date	May 327 BC – March 326 BC
Location	modern-day Afghanistan and Pakistan 35.2°N 72.483333°E
Result	Macedonian victory
Territorial changes	Hellenic conquest of the Cophen country, modern Kunar, Panjkora, and Swat valleys.

Belligerents
Macedon; League of Corinth	Aśvaka; Guraeans

Commanders and leaders
Alexander the Great (WIA); Craterus; Perdiccas; Ptolemy I Soter (WIA); Leonnatus (WIA)	Cleophis; Abisares
- Location of the Cophen Valley

Alexander the Great
current battle

The Cophen campaign (Ancient Greek: Κωφήν, romanized: Kōphḗn) was conducted by Alexander the Great between May 327 BC and March 326 BC against the Aspasioi, the Guraeans, and the Assakenoi tribes in the Kabul, Kunar, Panjkora and Swat valleys, in present-day Afghanistan and Pakistan. The main aim of Alexander was to secure the Macedonian line of communications so that the Macedonian army could proceed into India properly.

== Background ==
It had been Alexander's purpose to conquer the whole of the Persian Empire which extended as far as Gandhara. A previous king of the Persian Achaemenid Empire, Darius the Great, had sent one of his generals, Skylax, to sail down the Indus. Following this expedition, Darius was able to conquer the surrounding Indian territory and receive tribute of 350 Euboic talents per annum. Relatively little is known about the Punjab in Alexander's day. There were a variety of princelings and republics, which the Indians called "kingless" peoples. All were vying for power over the region.

The King of Taxila, Omphis, whom the Macedonians called Taxiles after his capital city, had invited Alexander to come to his aid in his struggle against the neighbouring potentate Porus. Porus was considered to be the most powerful prince in the region. Another king, Sisicotus (his reconstructed name might be Shashigupta), had served in the Persian Army at Gaugumela, later becoming Alexander's vassal. Alexander gained useful intelligence concerning the region from these individuals.

Alexander had begun planning the expedition two years before, in 329 BC, but had been delayed in carrying out the expedition by a series of revolts that had taken place in Aria, Sogdiana and Bactria. He was held up in putting down these revolts as he had been marching through the Hindu Kush mid-winter and decided to camp in the mountains. It was during this time that he founded the city of Alexandria ad Caucasum. This city was some twenty-five miles north-west of modern Kabul, in Afghanistan.

Returning to Alexandria ad Caucasum in May 327 BC he found a surfeit of victual and supplies ready for the army for its expedition into India. However, there were administrative matters that required his attention. Both the satrap of the Paropamisadae, Proëxes, and the commander of the garrison, Neiloxinus, were replaced due to their unsatisfactory conduct. When Alexander set out for Nicaea, it is said that he had 150,000 soldiers. Historians have expressed doubts about the veracity of these numbers. Alexander had in his army soldiers from Greece, Thrace and Agriania as well as soldiers from various territories within his new empire. Leaving Alexandria ad Caucasum, Alexander marched to Nicaea, where he sacrificed to Athena (which was his habit at the beginning of every campaign) and exclaiming that he was following in the footsteps of his ancestor Heracles, began his advance towards the Indus along the Kabul River (which the Greeks called "Cophen").

== First phase—Aspasians ==
While on the march, Alexander sent ambassadors ahead to the various tribes that were ahead of him, ordering them to submit and provide him with hostages. Taxila and several other princes came to him bringing him gifts as proof of their vassalage and paying tribute with gifts for the Macedonians. Amongst the gifts that the Macedonians had never seen before, the Indian potentates furnished Alexander with 25 elephants

As Alexander had now effectively replaced Darius III as King of Persia, Alexander was now effectively the new overlord of the Empire, including this easternmost region. Therefore, Alexander was able to treat anyone who resisted him as in revolt against him. While descending into the Cophen valley, Alexander informed his new vassals of his intentions. He planned to spend the rest of the summer and autumn reducing the region ahead of him up to the Indus River. From there, he was going to proceed beyond the Indus and punish the Indian states and tribes which had not recognised him as their overlord and had not sent him ambassadors with tribute.

However, he found that the campaign was far more difficult than he had anticipated. At Nicaea, he took the time to split his army into two separate forces with the object of retaining the interior lines so that he could reinforce his army at any point should any particular section of his army become threatened during the course of his campaign in the valley of the Cophen. In addition to this, these two forces were to keep the Indian rulers in the region from combining their forces and coordinating their efforts against the Macedonians.

The army that was to march along the river Cophen was to be commanded by Perdiccas and Hephaestion. They were accompanied by the king of Taxila to take advantage of his knowledge of the region. They were to proceed along the southern bank of the Cophen. They had at their disposal three brigades led by Gorgias, Clitus and Meleager, half the Companion (mostly Macedonian noblemen who were equipped with a spear, a shield and were disciplined to such an extent that they have been called "the first real cavalry") and all the Greek mercenary cavalry. Their instructions were to follow the river to the Indus, bringing all the cities and fortifications to submission on the way through either systematic reduction or by terms. Then they were to build a bridge upon their arrival at the Indus so that when the King arrived and after the winter when Alexander had wintered his army in the region, they could proceed to cross the river and punish the tribes across the Indus.

Meanwhile, Alexander had at his disposal the bulk of the forces in his army. These forces comprised the shield bearing guards (known as the "silver shields"), four regiments of Companion cavalry, the Phalanx (other than those who marched with the first column), the foot agema, the archers, the other half of the horse archers, the Agrianians and the horse lancers.

Alexander planned to march along all the valleys that were in between Nicaea and the river Indus intending to subdue those tribes that had not paid tribute.

Alexander received information that the Aśvaka (which the Greeks called "Aspasians"), the first tribe whose lands he had entered, had retreated to their capital. Eager to defeat them, the Macedonians crossed a river with all the cavalry and eight hundred Macedonian infantry mounted on horses. They arrived quickly enough to kill a number of the Aspasians and drive them within their walls. The rest of the army came up the next day and took the city. However, a number of the Aspasians decided to flee before the city was taken, seeing their cause as lost. The Macedonians followed them and killed a great many of them. Alexander's men, enraged to see that their king had been injured during the course of the siege, razed the city to the ground. The Macedonians marched off to the next town, Andaca, which capitulated.

The King's campaign through the Aspasian territory.

Alexander then left Craterus, whom he had probably kept in hand in case of just such an occasion, in command of a force responsible for gaining and keeping control of the tribes living in the surrounding valleys.

Alexander's next destination was Euspla, where the King of the Aspasians was based. At this point, deeming their cause lost, the Aspasians burned this city and fled. The Macedonians pursued them. During the ensuing combat, one of the Aspasians thrust his spear right through Ptolemy's breast plate, but the spear did not make contact with him due to the armour stopping the severity of the blow. It was at this point that Ptolemy killed the King of the Aspasians.

== Second phase—Guraeans ==
After defeating the Aspasians and thus securing his lines of communication, the Macedonians marched towards the Guraean fortified city of Arigaeum. On hearing news of Alexander's capacity as a general and besieger, the populace razed the fortress. It was at this particular point that Craterus returned to Alexander after gaining control over the Aspasian valleys, including Andaca. Alexander ordered Craterus to set up several new colonies in the region, including Arigaeum. Control of Arigaeum and Andaca was important in controlling the Choaspes river, and occupying the fortresses with healthy garrisons would prove advantageous to Alexander in the case of revolts.

The Guraeans had retreated after burning their fortified city, joined up with their fellow tribesmen and prepared themselves to face Alexander.

=== Siege of Arigaeum ===
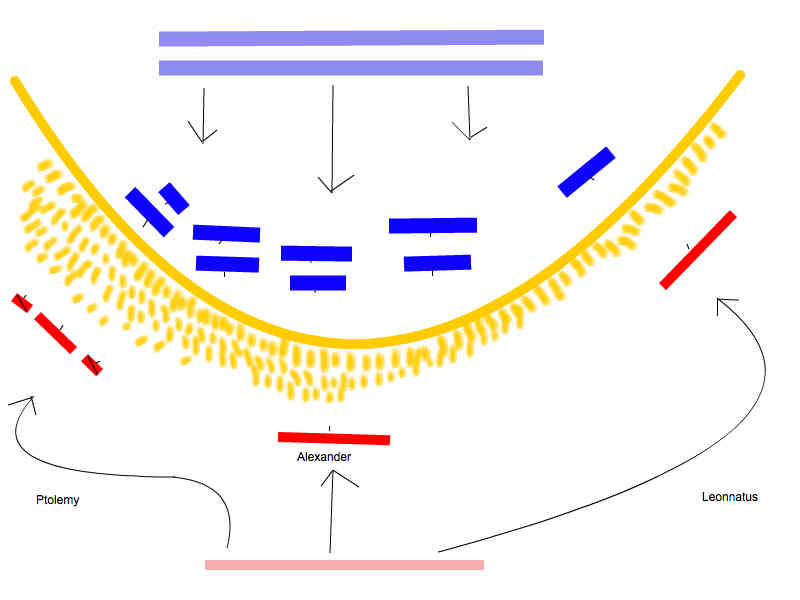
The King's force takes up the center of the Macedonian line while Ptolemy and Leonnatus' forces take a circuit to catch the barbarians by surprise.

Ptolemy, who had been sent ahead on a foraging expedition, came back to the main contingent of the army under Alexander and reported that there was a very large force assembled and preparing to face the Macedonians.

When the Macedonians arrived where the assembled force had gathered, Alexander divided his army into three parts with Ptolemy taking up the left (he commanded a third of the hypaspists, the brigades of Philip and Philotas, two squadrons of horse archers, the Agrianians and half the remaining cavalry). Leonnatus was ordered to take up the right flank, with Attalus' and Balacrus' brigades. Alexander took up the centre opposed to the Guraean centre. Alexander sent Ptolemy and Leonnatus to their respective flanks by routes that the Guraeans could not observe, thus hiding these two particular flanks of his army (lined roughly obliquely with his centre line) from the Guraeans. Alexander's contingent was comparatively small, and he planned to lure them out and to fight them while Leonnatus and Ptolemy took their flanks.

As expected, the Guraeans attacked Alexander's small contingent, and after Ptolemy faced rough fighting, he was able to achieve victory on his flank. Leonnatus' victory was comparatively easier, after which time the enemy surrendered. It is said that 40,000 Guraeans were captured.

== Third phase—Assacenians ==
Following his victory over the Garaeans, Alexander marched down the Garaeus river, subduing the tribes of this region to tribute-paying status. From there he proceeded into the valley of the Suastos where there was a force of two thousand cavalry, thirty thousand infantry and thirty elephants. Alexander raced forward with the van, trying to do all he could to upset their preparations, while Craterus followed up at a more methodical pace with the main force. It is specifically mentioned that he had the siege engines with him. It must have been a great relief for the Macedonians to proceed into the relatively flat lands of this region of the Indus compared to the mountainous regions they had been in. The speed with which the Macedonian van proceeded was such that Alexander was able to prevent facing a full complement of enemy forces. In response to Alexander's tactics, it was written that each of the enemy tribes retreated to their respective territories.

=== Siege of Massaga ===
Alexander then marched towards Massaga, the largest Assacenian fortified city and their capital. The Assacenians had acquired the services of 7,000 mercenaries from beyond the Indus. These mercenaries were soldiers of considerable capability, and as a result of their presence, the Assacenians as well as the mercenaries themselves were confident of victory against the Macedonians.

Upon arriving at Massaga, Alexander ordered that the camp be set up outside of the capital. However, the Assacenians were so confident thanks to the support of their mercenaries that they decided to immediately attack. Seeing an opportunity, Alexander ordered his men to retreat to a hill about a mile distant from the town. In pursuing the Macedonians, the Assacenians lost their discipline and became disordered due to their excitement at the prospect of having caught the Macedonians so off guard. However, when they finally came within range of the Macedonian bows, Alexander ordered his bowmen to fire on the Assacenians. The mounted javelin men, Agrianians and archers at once dashed forward to attack. These were swiftly followed by the phalanx, which Alexander led in person. Alexander was injured during the course of this action and is alleged to have stated, "They may call me son of Zeus, but I suffer nonetheless like a mortal. This is blood, not ichor!"

A subsequent assault on Massaga proved to be unsuccessful with the professional mercenaries showing that they were worth the gold they were getting paid. The next day, Alexander ordered the siege equipment to be brought up and ordered a section of the wall to be battered down. However, the mercenaries were successful in preventing this action from succeeding. As a result, Alexander ordered that a tower and terrace be built; this took nine days. Alexander then ordered that the tower be advanced toward the wall. Archers and slingers, most likely from Cyprus, were stationed on the tower as it was moved forward in order to keep the defenders at a distance.

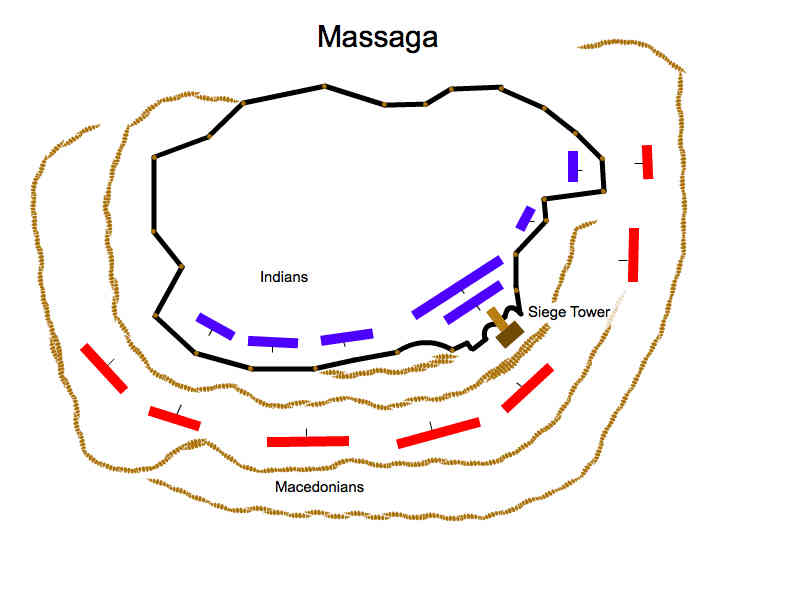
Alexander ordered that a tower and terrace be built—it took nine days—after which time he ordered that archers and slingers be stationed on top of the tower and force the defenders from the ramparts.

The mercenaries fought fiercely and would not let the Macedonians through. The next day, Alexander ordered that from the tower they extend a bridge and would have the same men who stormed Tyre from the bridges built on the mole to storm the Assacenians. Meanwhile, the archers and slingers would continue to fire as before. However, again, the mercenaries put up fierce resistance. While this was going on, Alexander ordered that a unit of hypaspists charge across the bridge at the mercenaries. However, too many of them rushed upon it too quickly, and the hastily built bridge collapsed under their weight. Seeing the opportunity, the Assacenians fired volleys of arrows, stones and even fireballs into the ditch on top of the men. The pit the hypaspists had fallen into was to be their tomb, and a great many of them were slain. However, Alexander saved those he could by attacking this sortie with a counter-attack of his own.

The next day, the Macedonians built another bridge and attacked in a similar manner. However, during the course of the attack the Macedonians managed to kill the leader of the mercenaries. Consequentially, the Assacenians decided to negotiate their surrender.

Alexander's conditions for their surrender were that the Assacenians agree to serve under him and they surrender to him the Massagan king's family as hostages. However, the Assacenians were unwilling to agree to this as this would mean fighting their fellow tribes and clans. They decided to retreat from the encampment they had made near the city after they had surrendered to Alexander. On hearing of this, Alexander had his troops surround the hill where the Assacenians were camped. As the Assacenians attempted to make their escape, all hell broke loose and the Macedonians killed a great many of them. After this, the Macedonians proceeded back to Massaga and took it with ease, and killed all the soldiers in the garrison of the city. During the course of the siege, the Macedonians had lost no more than 25 men; however, several of them were wounded.

=== Sieges of Bazira and Ora ===
During the course of the siege of the fortress of Massaga, Alexander was of the view that the taking of Massaga would strike the tribes in the surrounding territory with fear as to his power and ability. When it became clear that the stronghold would surrender, Alexander decided to dispatch a number of his lieutenants to the surrounding fortress towns to follow up on this victory. He ordered Coenus to proceed to Bazira with the expectation that this town would capitulate as a result of Massaga. Simultaneously, he sent Alcetas, Attalus and Demetrius to Ora with the very specific orders to blockade Ora until he could arrive himself and take it.

Upon arriving at Ora, Alcetas was attacked by Ora's inhabitants. However, Alcetas was easily able to drive this sortie back into the town. Bazira, which stood on the precipice of a mountain, was fortified by "nature and art" and showed no signs of capitulating. After receiving the submission of Massaga and massacring its inhabitants, Alexander set out in the direction of Bazira. However, while proceeding to Bazira he received the news that Abisares, the ruler of Hazara, was going to cross the Indus with his soldiers to interrupt the siege and assist Ora. Alexander changed his plans and set out for Ora with all the forces under his immediate command. In addition to this, he ordered Coenus to establish a camp and fortify it as an eventual base of operations against the town of Bazira. Coenus was then to leave a suitable garrison at that base to observe Bazira and while he joined Alexander and his forces at Ora.

However, when Coenus left Bazira, the town's inhabitants sallied out and attacked the encampment he had set up. These tribesmen lost 500 of their fellow tribesmen during the course of this attack, and were easily driven back. A few days later, the Macedonians were able to take Ora, after which point the inhabitants of Bazira saw their cause as lost, abandoned Bazira to the Macedonians and headed off to Aornus.

It was as a result of these conquests that Alexander did conquered the inhabitants of the Peshawar valley. The Peshawar valley ran perpendicularly to the Swat river, which flowed on a north–south axis. This valley was effectively an opening through which Abisares could pass through. It was therefore critical for Alexander to take the whole of the valley so that no reinforcements could be brought up into the valley and file through either the north or south exit of the valley and attack Alexander while he was besieging Aornus. A historian of Alexander's, who took up the issue and examined the topography of the region, had this to say about the strategic situation that Alexander had developed for himself as a result of this campaign

to understand the sound strategic reasons which caused Alexander, before attacking Aornus, first to turn south to the Peshawar valley. Once he had consolidated his hold there and made his arrangements for crossing the Indus quite secure, he could safely move up to the right bank and attack the mountain retreat of the Swat fugitives from the south. He thus avoided the entanglement of the mountainous region that would have attended and hampered direct pursuit from the Swat side. The fugitive host could be cut off from retreat to the east of the Indus and from such assistance as Abisares, the ruler on that side, might offer. Finally, when attacking Aornus from the south, Alexander could command all the advantages that the Indus valley and the fertile plains of the Peshawar valley would offer in respect of supplies and other resources

=== Siege of Aornus ===
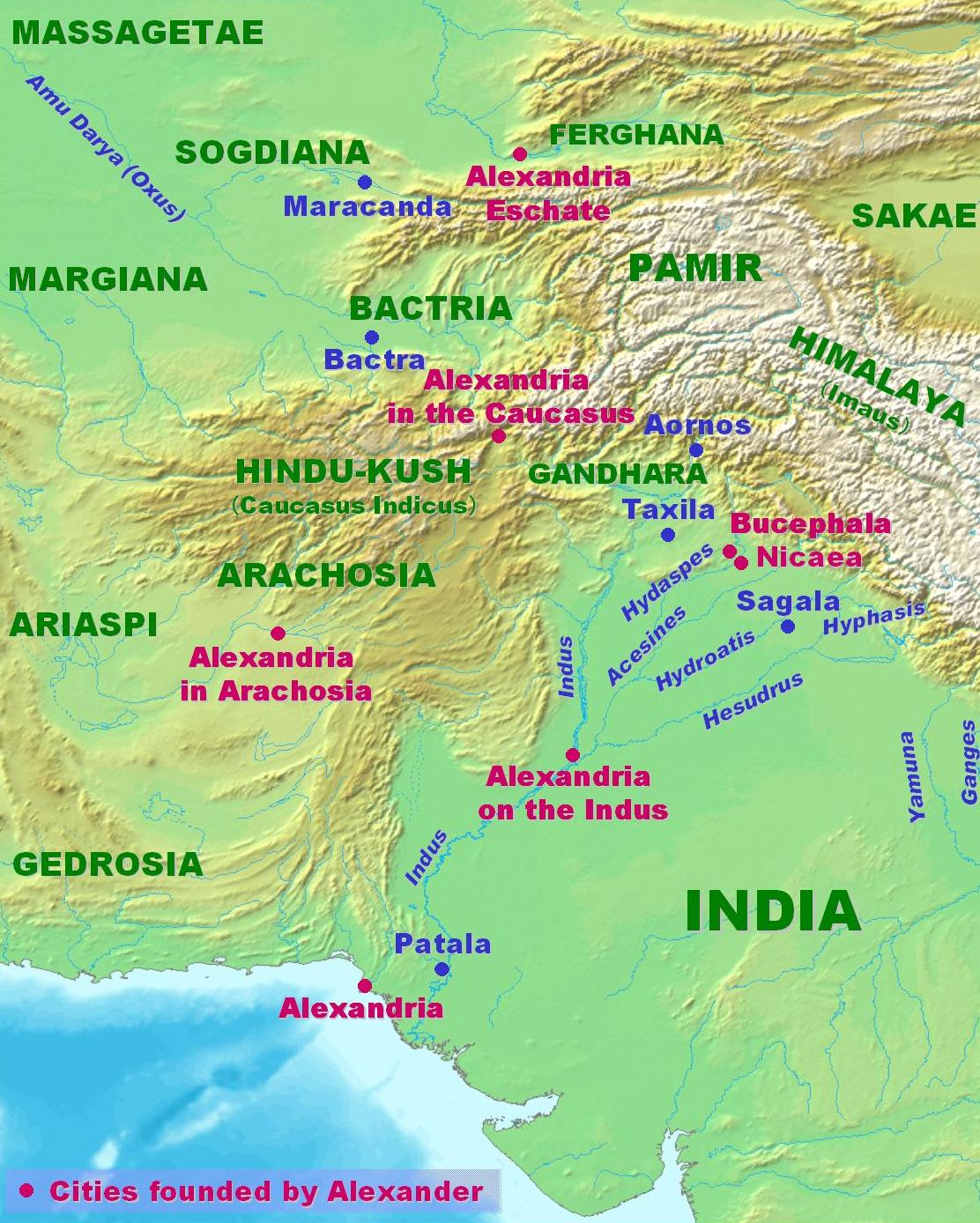
The Aornos is located to the north of Taxila.

Aornos (modern Swat, Pakistan) was the site of Alexander the Great's last siege, "the climax to Alexander's career as the greatest besieger in history" according to Alexander's biographer Robin Lane Fox. The siege took place in the winter of 327–326 BC. (The site has been identified as being near the Pir-Sar mountain in Swat by Aurel Stein in 1926, and has been confirmed by archaeologists.) It offered the last threat to Alexander's supply line, which stretched in a dangerously vulnerable manner, over the Hindu Kush back to Balkh. The site lies north of Attock in Punjab, on a strongly reinforced mountain spur above the narrow gorges in a bend of the upper Indus River. It had a flat summit well supplied with natural springs and wide enough to grow crops. Therefore, it could not be starved into submission. Neighbouring tribesmen who surrendered to Alexander offered to lead him to the best point of access.

Ptolemy and Alexander's secretary Eumenes, whose account provided material for all later records of the event, reconnoitred and reinforced a neighbouring spur to the west with a stockade and ditch. Their signal fire to Alexander also alerted the defenders of Pir-Sar, and it took two days of skirmishing in the narrow ravines for Alexander to regroup. At the vulnerable north side leading to the fort, Alexander and his catapults were stopped by a deep ravine. To bring the siege engines within reach, an earthwork mound was constructed to bridge the ravine with carpentry, brush and earth. The first day's work brought the siege mound 50 metres (60 yards) closer, but as the sides of the ravine fell away steeply below, progress rapidly slowed. Nevertheless, at the end of the third day, a low hill connected to the nearest tip of Pir-Sar was within reach and was taken, after Alexander, in the vanguard and his first force were repelled by boulders rolled down from above. Three days of drumbeats marked the defenders' celebration of the initial repulse, followed by a surprise retreat. Alexander hauled himself up the last rock face on a rope. Alexander cleared the summit, slaying some fugitives (inflated by Arrian to a massacre), and erected altars to Athena Nike, Athena of Victory, traces of which were identified by Stein.

=== Siege of Nysa ===
When Alexander arrived at the city of Nysa, which was between the rivers Cophen and Indus, the city's citizens sent out to him their president, whose name was Acuphis (Ἄκουφις), and thirty of their most distinguished men as envoys. When they entered Alexander's tent and saw him, they made a Proskynesis. When Alexander told them to rise, the Acuphis started his speech. In his speech he said that the god Dionysus founded the city and named it Nysa and the land Nysaea (Νυσαία) after his nurse and also he named the mountain near the city, Meron (Μηρὸν) (i.e. thigh), because he grew in the thigh of Zeus and Alexander should leave their city independent for the sake of the god. Alexander believed them and left the city self governed but asked from the Acuphis to send his own son, his daughter's son and some horsemen to accompany him.

Then, together with his Companion cavalry went to the mountain and they made ivy garlands and crowned themselves with them, as they were, singing hymns in honor of Dionysus. Alexander also offered sacrifices to Dionysus, and feasted in company with his companions. On the other hand, according to Philostratus although Alexander wanted to go up the mountain he decided not to do it because he was afraid that when his men will see the vines which were on the mountain they would feel home sick or they will recover their taste for wine after they had become accustomed to water only, so he decided to make his vow and sacrifice to Dionysus at the foot of the mountain.
