= Aornis =

Aornis may refer to:

- Aornis Hades, the Thursday Next series character, or her namesake, a fictional tributary of the river Styx.

See also:

- Aornos, the site of the battle fought by Alexander the Great's forces
- Avernus, a volcanic crater in Italy called Aornos by the Greeks, thought to be the entrance to the Underworld.
