= Sisikottus =

4th-century BCE ruler in South Asia

Sisikottus (Sanskrit: Śaśigupta; Prakrit: Śaśiguṭṭa) was a native dynast and Indian officer of Alexander the Great. He had earlier served the Achaemenid pretender Bessus in Bactria, but entered the service of Alexander after he conquered Bactria, later serving as his satrap (hyparch) over Assaceni and as the commander at Aornos. He is also known as Sisikottos (from Arrian) and Sisocostus (from Curtius).

== Etymology ==
The name in the Greco-Roman sources corresponds to the Prakrit Śaśiguṭṭa and Sanskrit Śaśigupta, literally "moon-protected". Sisikottus is sometimes controversially linked with Chandragupta, the founder of Maurya Empire, otherwise known from the Greco-Roman sources as Sandracottus, whose name has the same etymology.

== Biography ==
Sisikottos/Sisocostus appears twice in Arrian's Anabasis and once in Historiae Alexandri Magni by Curtius. He is first mentioned after the capture of the fort of Aornos during the Cophen campaign of Alexander the Great, after which Alexander appointed him commander of the fort. Arrian further says that Sisikottus had previously served the Persian satrap Bessus at Bactria after deserting from the Indians, and that when Alexander conquered Bactria, Sisikottus entered his service and proved himself trustworthy. Later, when Alexander was in Punjab, Sisikottus, then serving as hyparch of the Assaceni, sent him news of the Assaceni revolt and the killing of their unnamed satrap (hyparch), probably Nicanor, or more likely, Assagetes (Aśvajit), an Assaceni chief. Alexander sent Phillip and Tyriaspes to restore order. Sisikottus has been suggested to be a relative of Assakenos, the king of Assaceni. Nothing further is known about him or his career.

== See also ==
- Sophytes
- Sophagasenus
- Sisicottus

== Sources ==
- Olivieri, Luca M. (2025). "Double-crop Pocket Zones and Empires: The Case of Swat". Economies of the Edge. Heidelberg University Publishing. pp. 45–80. doi:10.17885/HEIUP.1582.C22721. ISBN 978-3-96822-326-1.
- Fauconnier, Bram (2015). "Ex Occidente imperium. Alexander the Great and the Mauryan Empire". Histos. 9: 120–173. doi:10.29173/histos288. ISSN 2046-5963.
- Heckel, Waldemar (2006). Who's Who in the Age of Alexander the Great: Prosopography of Alexander’s Empire. Malden, Mass: Blackwell Publishing, Blackwell Pub. ISBN 978-1-4051-1210-9. OCLC 59147827.
- Worthington, Ian (2003). Alexander the Great: A Reader. Psychology Press. ISBN 978-0-415-29186-6.
- Daniélou, Alain (2003) [1971]. A Brief History of India. Inner Traditions. ISBN 978-1-59477-794-3.
