= Acadera =

Region in the northwest of India

Acadera or Acadira was a region in the northwest of India, traversed by Alexander the Great as related by first-century Roman historian Quintus Curtius Rufus. Arrian describes it not as a region but as a city he terms Andaca, which Alexander took by storm, during the Cophen Campaign, 327 BCE to 326 BCE.
