= Gorgus =

Gorgus was a mining engineer (metalleutes) who accompanied Alexander the Great. He reported gold and silver mines in the territory of the Indian ruler, Sophytes. Nothing else is known about him.
