= Sophytes =

Indo-Greek king

Sophytes, or Subhūti, was the name of a king in Punjab in the northwestern Indian subcontinent at the time of invasion of Alexander the Great. Sophytes accepted his suzerainty and was allowed to retain his kingdom by Alexander.

According to some scholars, this Sophytes minted the Hellenistic coinage series mentioning his name ('ΣΩΦΥΤΟΥ' sōphutou) and dated to the 4th or 3rd century BCE, although the identification remains disputed.

== Biography ==
The literary references to Sophytes in the classical literature are those by Diodorus, Strabo, Arrian and Curtius, who mention him in the context of the invasion of Alexander the Great, and describe his kingdom to be around Salt Range between the rivers Ascines and Hydraotes in Punjab, on the right bank of Hydaspes. According to Diodorus, his kingdom was well managed. Sophytes himself welcomed Alexander and entertained him, who retained him on his position. He made a demonstration of four Indian dogs fighting a lion to Alexander. According to Strabo, a mining survey by the engineer Gorgus reported that the newly conquered land from Sophytes had plenty of gold and silver. Nothing more is known regarding Sophytes after the departure of Alexander.

The name Sophytes or Sophytos is of non-Greek origin. Since Sylvain Lévi first proposed it, it is usually suggested to be a Greek form of an Indo-Aryan Prākrit name, with Paul Bernard, Georges-Jean Pinault and Georges Rougemont giving its derivation from the well attested name Subhūti (of a disciple of Buddha).

== Coinage ==
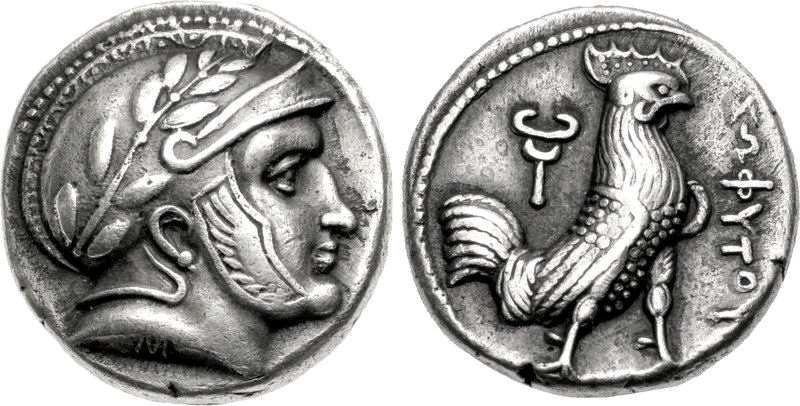
Coin of Sophytes: Obv: Sophytes in profile with tight helmet and wreath.Rev: Cock standing to right, with caduceus, and legend in Greek: ΣΩΦΥΤΟΥ "of Sophytes".

A Hellenistic style coinage series mentioning Sophytes ('ΣΩΦΥΤΟΥ' sōphutou, genitive form of either Sophytes or Sophytos) was first acquired by the British numismatists from the coin dealers in Rawalpindi, Punjab in the 19th-century. Alexander Cunningham published his study of the specimen in 1866, and following him, identification of the issuer of coins with Sophytes of the classical literature gained acceptance. In 1943, R. B. Whitehead argued against identification of the issuer with the Punjab ruler, and instead proposed place of origins of coins in Bactria. Following Whitehead the theory that Sophytes, the issuer of coinage, was different and based in Bactria has remained influential. Recently, Sushma Jansari, in a study of the then known specimens of the Sophytes coinage, has again considered the coins to have been minted by Sophytes mentioned in the Greco-Roman sources. Jansari also notes that the findspots of the coins are not securely known.

It has also been suggested that Sophytes who issued coins was a Mauryan satrap at Arachosia, which was ceded by Seleucus I Nicator to the Mauryan Empire in 303 BCE. Other theories of origin of coinage have also been proposed and their time period remains uncertain.

== See also ==
- Kandahar Sophytos Inscription
- Sophagasenus
- Abisares
- Sisikottos
