= Sisicottus quoylei =

Scientific classification
- Domain: Eukaryota
- Kingdom: Animalia
- Phylum: Arthropoda
- Subphylum: Chelicerata
- Class: Arachnida
- Order: Araneae
- Infraorder: Araneomorphae
- Family: Linyphiidae
- Genus: Sisicottus
- Species: S. quoylei

Binomial name
- Sisicottus quoylei Miller, 1999

Species of spider

Sisicottus quoylei is a species of dwarf spider in the family Linyphiidae. It is found in the United States and Canada.
