= Sophagasenus =

Indian king

Sophagasenos, also spelt Sophagasenus or Sophagasenas, (Sanskrit: Subhāgaseṇa) was an Indian king ruling in Kabul and Kapisa (Paropamisadae of the classical writings) during the last decades of 3rd century BCE. Sophagasenus finds reference only in the Histories of Polybius.

== Etymology ==
Sophagasenus is probably derived from the personal name Subhāgaseṇa.

== Reference by Polybius ==
Polybius (c. 204 – c. 122 BCE), the Greek historian, makes reference to Sophagasenus in context with Antiochus III's expedition across the Caucasus Indicus (Hindu Kush) in around 206 BCE. Having crossed the Caucasus Mountains, Antiochus moved up to Kabul and met Sophagasenus the Indian king with whom he renewed league and friendship he had made previously. and received more elephants until he had one hundred and fifty of them all together. He then returned home via Arachosia, Drangiana and Karmania. (Note: Translation of Polybius 11.34: "He (Antiochus) crossed the Caucasus Indicus (Paropamisus) and descended into India; renewed his friendship with Sophagasenus the king of the Indians; received more elephants, until he had a hundred and fifty all together; and having once more provisioned his troops, set out again personally with his army: leaving Androsthenes of Cyzicus the duty of taking home the treasure which this king had agreed to hand over to him. Having traversed Arachosia and crossed the river Enymanthus, he came through Drangene to Carmania; and as it was now winter, he put his men into winter quarters there.")

== See also ==
- Sophytes
- Sisikottus
- Odirajas
