= Abisares =

4th-century BCE Indian monarch

Abisares (or Abhisara; in Greek Ἀβισάρης), called Embisarus (Ἐμβίσαρος,) by Diodorus, was a king whose territory lay in the river Hydaspes beyond the mountains. On his death in 325 BC, Alexander the Great appointed Abisares' son as his successor.

== Biography ==
The territory of Abisares was located to the north of that of Taxiles by Arrian, who further states him to have been intending to join Porus against Alexander the Great; Plutarch adds that Abisares himself approached with a large army. After Alexander defeated Porus, he sent an embassy to Alexander and offered his submission. Abisares, who was reportedly ill, made his brother Arsaces his representative and also sent thirty elephants and valuable gifts. Alexander retained Abisares on his position and made the territory of his brother subordinate to him after imposing a tribute. Curtius states that Alexander appointed his son as his successor after Abisares died.

According to Strabo, Onesicritus reported Abisares to have two huge snakes and Alexander had a great desire to see them.

== Location ==
The name Abhisara (Greek: Abisares) appears in the accounts of the historians of Alexander the Great and in later Indian traditions.

Aurel Stein equates the Hazara region, frequently identified as the ancient Urasa with Abhisara. The name Abhisara is known from Mahabharata and Puranic literature to refer to a northern people or region.

== See also ==
- Sophytes
- Sisikottus
- Cleophis
