= Sisicottus =

Scientific classification
- Kingdom: Animalia
- Phylum: Arthropoda
- Subphylum: Chelicerata
- Class: Arachnida
- Order: Araneae
- Infraorder: Araneomorphae
- Family: Linyphiidae
- Genus: Sisicottus; Bishop & Crosby, 1938

Type species
- S. montanus (Emerton, 1882)

Species
- 9, see text

Genus of spiders

Sisicottus is a genus of sheet weavers that was first described by S. C. Bishop & C. R. Crosby in 1938. They can be found in moss and litter of conifer forests.

== Species ==
As of May 2019 it contains nine species, found in Russia, the United States, Canada and on the Kuril Islands:

- Sisicottus aenigmaticus Miller, 1999 – USA
- Sisicottus crossoclavis Miller, 1999 – USA, Canada
- Sisicottus cynthiae Miller, 1999 – USA
- Sisicottus montanus (Emerton, 1882) (type) – USA, Canada
- Sisicottus montigena Bishop & Crosby, 1938 – USA
- Sisicottus nesides (Chamberlin, 1921) – USA, Canada
- Sisicottus orites (Chamberlin, 1919) – USA, Canada
- Sisicottus panopeus Miller, 1999 – USA, Canada, Russia (Kurile Is.)
- Sisicottus quoylei Miller, 1999 – USA, Canada
