= Cleophis =

Maharani Kripa (Cleophis)
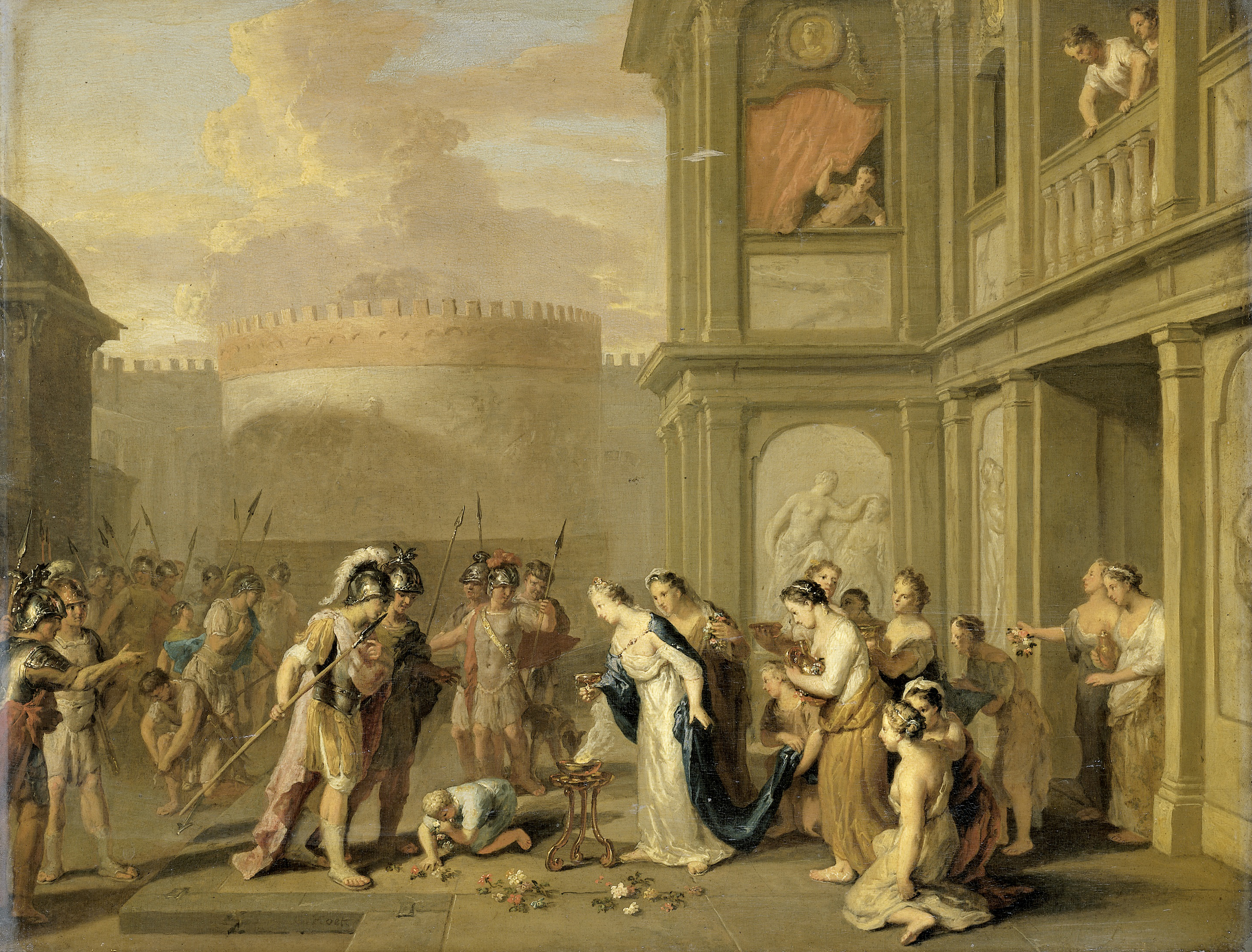
- Queen Cleophis Offers Alexander the Great Wine after Conquering Massaga

Queen of Assacani
- Reign: 326 BC – ?
- Predecessor: Assacanus (as King)
- Successor: Alexander (as King; allegedly)
- Partner: Alexander the Great (allegedly)
- Issue: Assacanus; Unnamed second son (Note: According to Curtius.); Alexander (allegedly)

Cleophis or Cleophylis (Sanskrit: Kripa ) was an Assacani queen, who took power in 326 BC either in her own right or as regent, (Note: Justin claims Cleophis reigned in her own right, while according to Metz Epitome she ruled merely on behalf of her grandson (Assacanus's son) as regent.) and went to become key figure in the war between the Assacani people and Alexander the Great. While she is mentioned in Greek sources on Alexander; her name appears only in post-Augustus Latin texts and it was proposed, based on their similarity, that Roman imperial authors invented it to recall the name of Cleopatra.

Cleophis was the mother of Assacanus, the Assacanis' war-leader at the time of Alexander's invasion in 326 BCE. After her son's death in battle, Cleophis assumed command and negotiated a settlement that allowed her to retain her status. Justin claims Cleophis had with Alexander a son, who was a namesake of his father; this notion is, however, dismissed by modern historians.

The Assacani (called Ashvakas in Sanskrit, from the word Ashva, meaning "horse") were an independent people who lived in parts of the Swat and Buner valleys in ancient Gandhara. These highlanders were rebellious, fiercely independent clans who resisted subjugation.

== Alexander's war with the Assacani ==
In 326 BCE, Alexander's campaigns west of the Indus River brought him into conflict with the Assacani. In defence of their homeland, they assembled an army of 20,000 cavalry, 38,000 infantry, and 30 elephants, according to classical writer Quintus Curtius Rufus. Their army included a contingent of 7,000 Kamboj mercenaries recruited from Abhisara.

After being defeated in the field, the Assacani fell back to the fortified city of Massaga, where the fighting continued for five days (or nine days, according to Curtius.) It was during this battle that Assacanus was killed. After her son's death, Cleophis assumed command, mustered the Assacani women to fight, and led the continued defence of the city. Rule of the Assacani fell to Cleophis.

Eventually, however, Cleophis judged that defeat was inevitable. She came to terms with the invaders and abandoned Massaga with her followers. Diodorus Siculus says the Indian queen (unnamed in his account): "impressed by Alexander's generosity, sent him valuable gifts and promised to follow his orders in everything." According Arrian, Cleophis was captured along with her granddaughter (Assacanus's daughter), while Curtius claims she was taken with her younger underaged son. Alexander allowed the Queen to maintain her throne as his vassal.

Alexander's retaliation against the defeated Assaceni was severe. He had Massaga burned. Victor Hansen writes: "After promising the surrounded Assaceni their lives upon capitulation, he executed all their soldiers who had surrendered. Their strongholds at Ora and Aornus, were also likewise stormed. Garrisons were probably all slaughtered."

Additionally, Alexander pursued the Kamboj mercenaries, surrounded them on a hill, and killed them all. Diodorus describes the event in detail: "...The women, taking up the arms of the fallen, fought side by side with their men. Accordingly, some who had supplied themselves with arms did their best to cover their husbands with their shields, while others, who were without arms, did much to impede the enemy by flinging themselves upon them and catching hold of their shields."

== Cleophis and Alexander ==
Later classical writers, including Curtius and Justin, claim that Alexander fathered a child with Cleophis. Historians dismiss this notion as a much later romantic invention. On Alexander's relatively generous terms, which allowed Cleophis to retain her status, Curtius says, "...some believed that this indulgent treatment was accorded rather to the charms of her person than to pity for her misfortunes. At all events, afterwards she gave birth to a son who received the name Alexander whoever his father may have been..." Arrian and Diodorus (in whose account Indian queen is unnamed), as well as Metz Epitome, do not mention this.

== See also ==
- Porus
- Abisares
- Taxiles

== Books and magazines ==
- Historie du bouddhisme Indien, Dr E. Lammotte
- Alexander the Great, 2003 - Cambridge University Press, W. W. Tarn
- Political History of Ancient India, 1996, Dr H. C. Raychaudhury
- The Invasion Of India By Alexander The Great As Described By Arrian, Q. Curtius, Diodorus, Plutarch And Justin, J. W. McCrindle
- Envy of the Gods: Alexander the Great's Ill-fated Journey Across Asia, John Prevas
- Carnage and Culture: Landmark Battles in the Rise to Western Power, Victor Hanson
- Alexander: A History of the Origin and Growth of the Art of War from the Earliest Times to the Battle of Ipsus, 301 Bc, With a Detailed Account of the Campaigns, 1996- Da Capo Press, Theodore Ayrault Dodge
- Alexander the Great in Fact and Fiction, 2002 - Oxford University Press, USA, A. B. Bosworth and E. J. Baynham
- The Wars of Alexander the Great, 2002- Osprey Publishing, Waldemar Heckel
- Classical Accounts of India, J. W. McCrindle
- History and Culture of Indian People, The Age of Imperial Unity, Dr R. C. Majumdar, Dr A. D. Pusalkar
- Ancient India, 2003, Dr V. D. Mahajan
- Problems of Ancient India, 2000, K. D. Sethna
- The Pathan., 1967, Olaf Caroe
- Historical Essays, Second Series, 3rd edition, Edward A. Freeman, M. A., HON. D. C. L. & LL.D., Regius Professor of Modern History in the University of Oxford, London Macmillan and Co. And New York,1892
- Alexander the Great, 2003, Dr W. W. Tarn
- Studies in Indian History and Civilization, Dr Buddha Parkash
- Ancient Kamboja, People and the Country, 1981, Dr J. L. Kamboj
- Hindu Polity, A constitutional History of India in Hindu Times, 1978, p 140, 121, Dr K. P. Jayswal
