= Taxiles =

Ruler of Taxila from 326 to 316 BCE

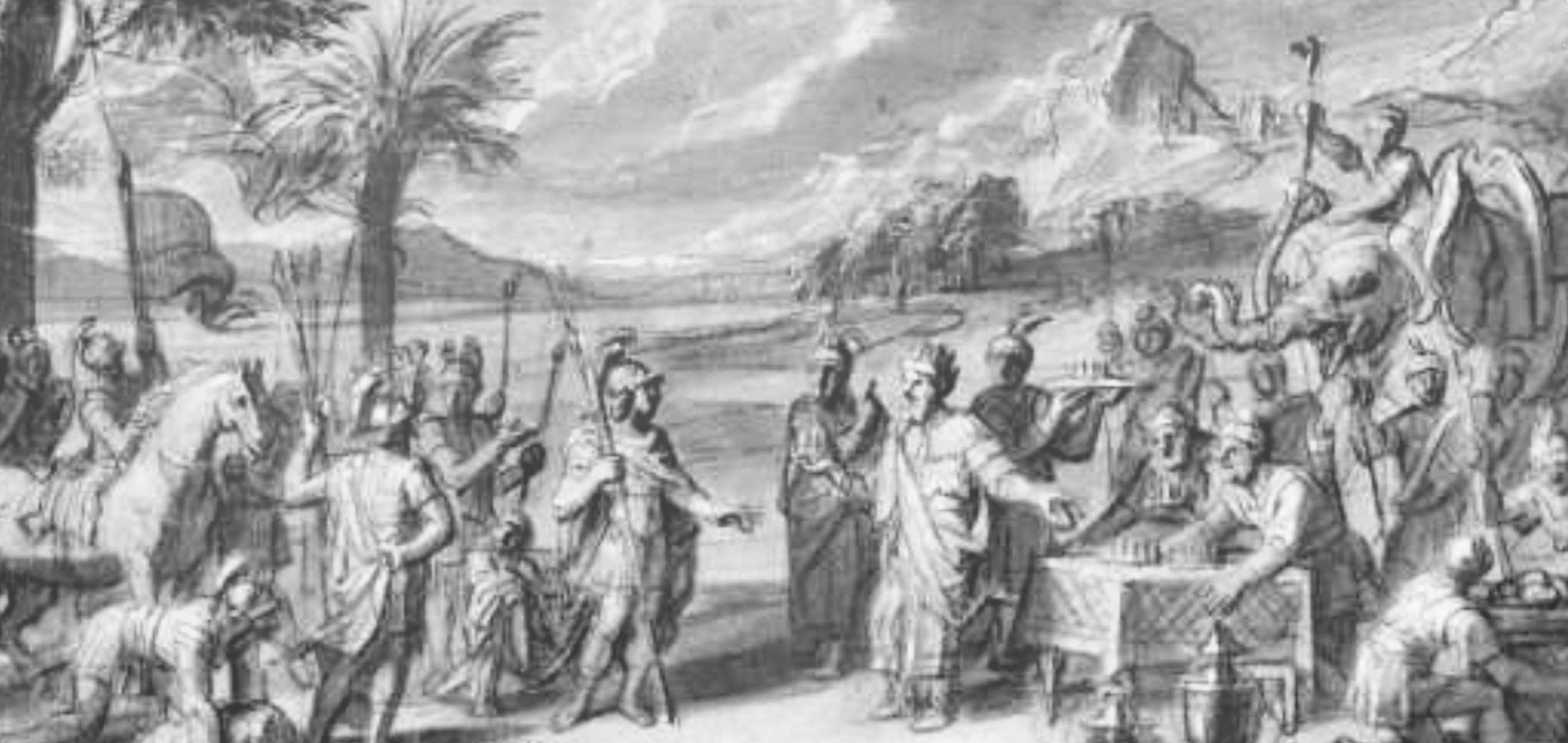
- Ambhi offering presents to Alexander the Great

King of Taxila
- Reign: c. 326–316 BCE

Taxiles or Taxilas (Ancient Greek: Tαξίλης, Taxílēs or Ταξίλας, Taxílas; r. 326 – 316 BCE) was the Greek chroniclers' name for the ruler who reigned over the tract between the Indus and the Hydaspes rivers in the Punjab region at the time of Alexander the Great's expedition. His real name may have been Ambhi (Greek: Omphis), and the Greeks appear to have called him Taxiles or Taxilas, after the name of his capital city of Taxila, near the modern city of Attock, Pakistan.

== Life ==
After Taxiles ascended to throne of Takshasila, he sent an embassy to Alexander along with presents consisting of 200 talents of silver, 3,000 fat oxen and 10,000 sheep or more (both are estimated around 600 talents of silver), a force of 700 horsemen and offered for surrender. He appears to have been on hostile terms with his neighbour, Porus, who held the territories east of the Hydaspes. It was probably with a view to strengthening himself against this foe that he sent an embassy to Alexander, while the latter was still in Sogdiana, with offers of assistance and support, perhaps in return for money.

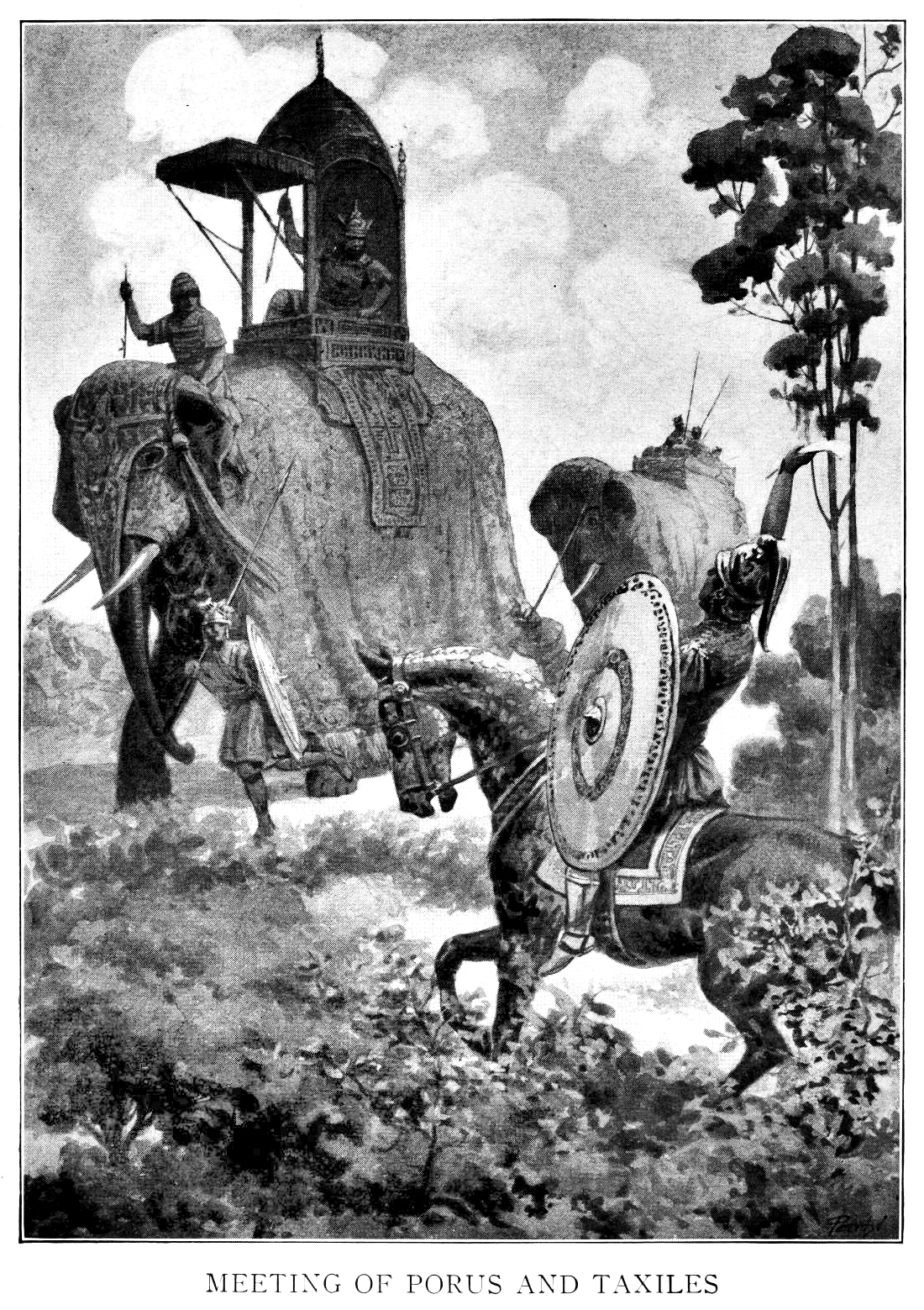
Meeting of king Porus and king Ambhi, a 20th century artist's imagination.

Alexander was cautious by the sight of Ambhi's forces on his first descent into India in 327 BC and ordered his own forces to form up. Ambhi hastened to relieve Alexander of his apprehension and met him with valuable presents, placing himself and all his forces at his disposal. Alexander not only returned Ambhi his title and the gifts but he also presented him with a wardrobe of "Persian robes, gold and silver ornaments, 30 horses and 1000 talents in gold". Alexander was emboldened to divide his forces, and Ambhi assisted Hephaestion and Perdiccas in constructing a bridge over the Indus where it bends at Hund (Fox 1973), supplied their troops with provisions, and received Alexander himself, and his whole army, in his capital city of Taxila, with every demonstration of friendship and the most liberal hospitality.

On the subsequent advance of the Macedonian king, Taxiles accompanied him with a force of 5000 men and took part in the Battle of the Hydaspes.

Later Eudemus took over Taxila briefly, after which Chandragupta Maurya conquered Alexander's satraps in the Indian subcontinent by 317 BC.

== See also ==
- Abisares
- Cleophis
- Pushkarasarin
