= Aśvaka =

People of ancient Gandhara

Asvakas (Sanskrit: Aśvaka) (Note: Also known in various sources as Āśvakāyana, Āśvāyana, Assakenoi, Aspasioi, and Aspasii, as well as several other Prakrit, Latin and Greek variants.) were an ancient people from Gandhara, in the present-day Pakistan and Afghanistan. The region in which they lived was also called Aśvaka.

== Etymology ==
The Sanskrit term aśva, Prakrit assa and Avestan aspa means horse. The name Aśvaka/Aśvakan or Assaka is derived from the Sanskrit Aśva or Prakrit Assa and it denotes someone connected with the horses, hence a horseman, or a cavalryman. The Asvakas were especially engaged in the occupation of breeding, raising and training war horses, as also in providing expert cavalry services. Some scholars believe that the term the term "Afghan" may be related to Aśvakan or Assakan.

== Ethnology ==
In the Major Rock Edicts of Ashoka, Asvakas are described as Gandhāras (Gandharians) who are recorded separately from Kambojas. Ancient Greek historians who documented the exploits of Alexander the Great refer to Aspasioi or Assakenoi (Ἀσσακηνοί) kin among his opponents. The historian R. C. Majumdar considers these words to be corruptions of Asvaka. It is possible that the corruption of the names occurred due to regional differences in pronunciation. Rama Shankar Tripathi thinks it possible that the Assakenoi were either allied to or a branch of the Aspasioi. The Greeks recorded the two groups as inhabiting different areas, with the Aspasioi in either the Alishang or Kunar Valley (or Kunar Province) and the Assakenoi in the Swat Valley.

== History ==
The Assakenoi fielded 2,000 cavalry, 30 elephants and 30,000 infantry (Note: The statistics for the Assakenoi forces that fought Alexander vary. For example, Barbara West says there were 30,000 cavalry, 20,000 infantry and at least 30 elephants.) against Alexander during his campaign in India, which began in 327 BCE, but they eventually had to surrender after losses at places such as Beira, Massaga and Ora. The Aspasioi chose to flee into the hills but destroyed their city of Arigaion before doing so; 40,000 of them were captured, along with 230,000 oxen. Diodorus recorded the strength of the Aśvaka opposition, noting that the women took up arms along with the men, preferring "a glorious death to a life of dishonour". Queen Cleophis was the main leader of Asvakas during their war against Alexander.

The Asvayanas have been attested to be good cattle breeders and agriculturists by classical writers. Arrian said that, during the time of Alexander, there were a large number of bullocks - 230,000 - of a size and shape superior to what the Macedonians had known, which Alexander captured from them and decided to send to Macedonia for agriculture.
