= Porus =

4th-century BC Indian ruler

- King
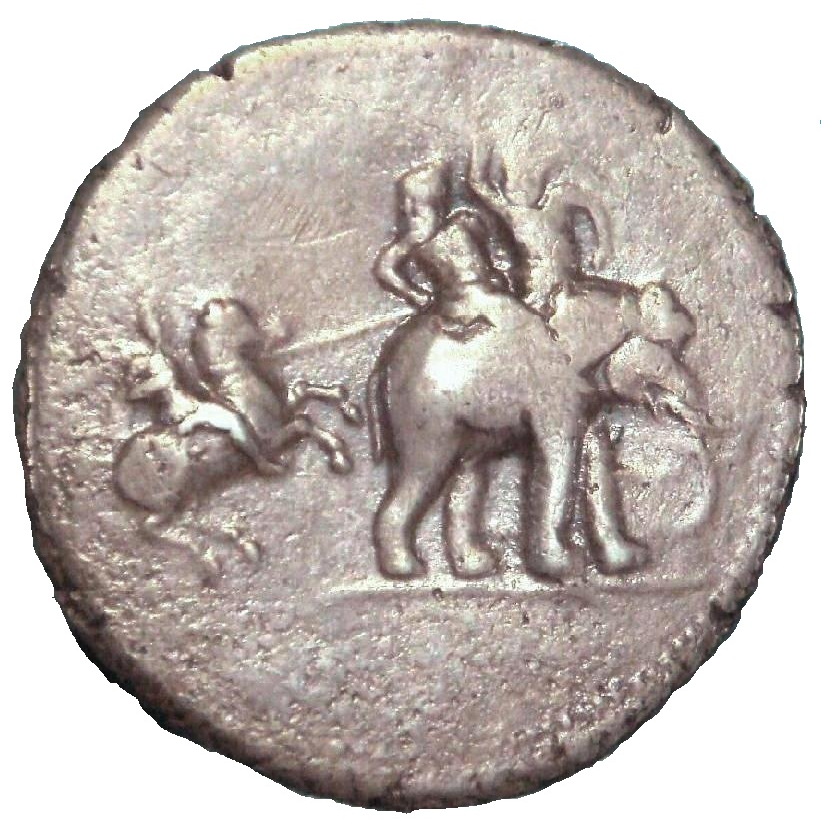
- Porus (on elephant) fighting Alexander the Great, on a "victory coin" of Alexander (minted c. 324–322 BC)
- Reign: before 326 – c. 317 BC

Satrap of Hyphasis
- Reign: 326 – c. 321 BC
- Died: c. 321 – c. 315 BC
- Military career
- Conflicts: Alexander's Indian campaign: Battle of Hydaspes

Porus or Poros (Ancient Greek: Πῶρος Pôros; fl. 326–321 BC) was an ancient Indian king whose territory spanned the region between the Hydaspes (Jhelum/Vitasta) and Acesines (Chenab/Asikani) rivers. He is only mentioned in Greek sources. Said to be a warrior with exceptional skills, Porus fought against Alexander the Great in the Battle of the Hydaspes (326 BC). Following the conflict, Porus retained his kingship. Alexander not only reinstated him as his satrap but also expanded his jurisdiction to include dominion over lands to the south-east extending as far as the Hyphasis (Beas River/Vipasha). Porus reportedly died sometime between 321 and 315 BC.

== Sources ==
The only contemporary information available on Porus and his kingdom is from Greek sources, whereas Indian sources do not mention him. The Greek sources differ considerably among themselves.

== Identification ==
=== Purus ===
Michael Witzel conjectures that Porus was a king of the Pūrus, a Vedic tribe, who existed as a marginal power in Sapta Sindhu after their defeat in the Battle of the Ten Kings. Hem Chandra Raychaudhuri largely agreed with this identification.

=== Saurasenis ===
Quintus Curtius Rufus mentions Porus' vanguard soldiers carrying a banner of "Herakles" during the face-off with Alexander. Accordingly, Ishwari Prasad and a few other scholars argue that Porus was a Shurasena. (Note: Iswhari Prashad and others following his lead, found further support for this conclusion in the fact that a section of Shurasenas were supposed to have migrated westwards to Punjab and modern Afghanistan from Mathura and Dvārakā, after Krishna walked to heaven and had established new kingdoms there.) This identification is based on the fact that multiple Greek histories — Indica by Arrian, Geographica by Strabo, and Bibliotheca historica by Diodorus Siculus — note Megasthenes (Note: He had traveled to India, after Porus had been already supplanted by Chandragupta Maurya.) to have described an Indian tribe called Sourasenoi who worshiped one "Herakles" and originated from the lands of Mathura and Yamuna. (Note: The Greeks often chronicled foreign gods in terms of their own divinities; multiple scholars have argued "Herakles" to mean "Hari-Krishna", the closest mythological equivalent. This identification also fits with the geography, Mathura being the epicenter of the Krshna cult. However, there is no evidence of Krishna worship as early as the 4th century BC. Some modern scholars equate "Herakles" to Indra but this identification is not widely accepted either.)

== Rule ==
=== Background ===
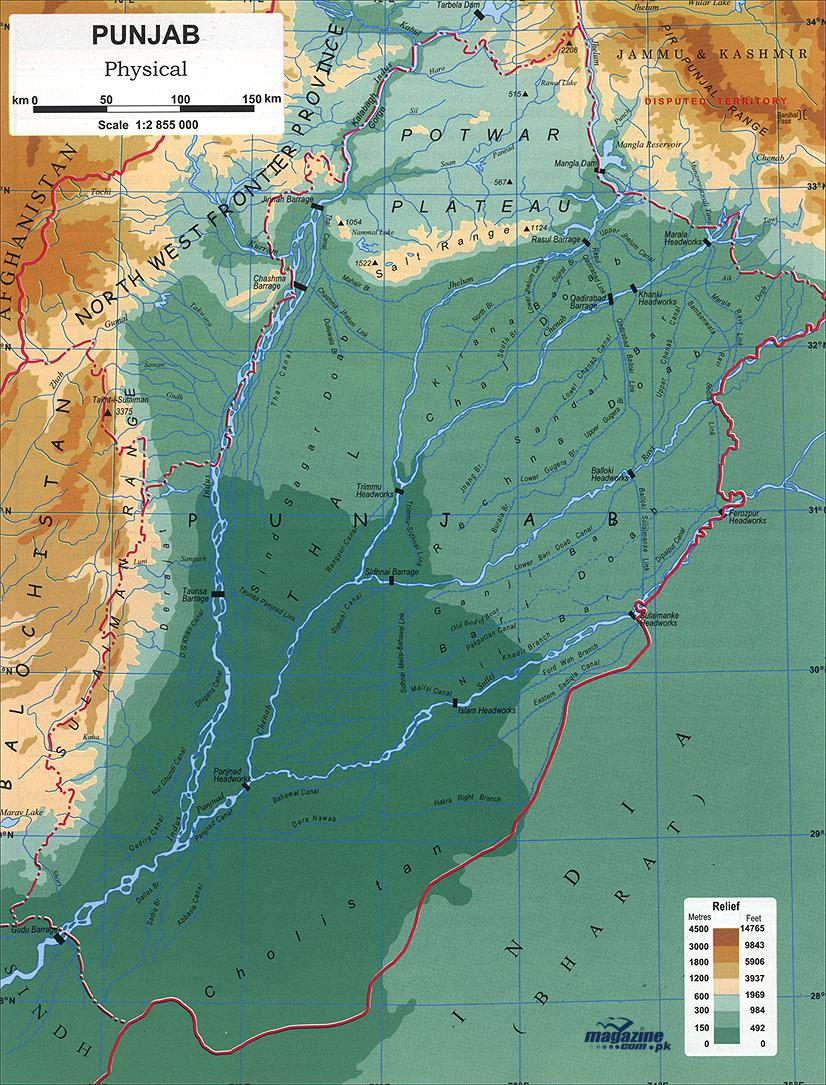
A detailed physical map of the Punjab region. The major rivers of the region including the Jhelum (Hydaspes) and Chenab (Acesines) are visible.

Porus ruled over the tracts between the rivers Hydaspes (Jhelum) and Acesines (Chenab); Strabo noted the territory to contain almost 300 cities. He had a hostile relationship with the neighboring polity of Taxila, having assassinated their erstwhile ruler Ambhiraj, his maternal uncle.

When Alexander crossed the Indus in their eastward invasion, probably in Udabhandapura, he was greeted by the then-ruler of Taxila, Omphis, son of Ambhiraj. Years ago, he had visited Alexander in Sogdiana and was treated as an ally; Omphis' rule was confirmed and gifts lavished, but a Macedonian satrap was installed. Omphis hoped to force both Porus and Abisares into submission, leveraging the might of Alexander's forces, and dispatched diplomatic missions to this effect.

In response, Abisares offered submission while Porus refused, leading Alexander to seek a face-off on the bank of Hydaspes. Thus began the Battle of the Hydaspes in 326 BC; the exact site remains unknown and the exact strength of the armies cannot be determined either, due to major discrepancies between sources.

=== Battle of the Hydaspes ===
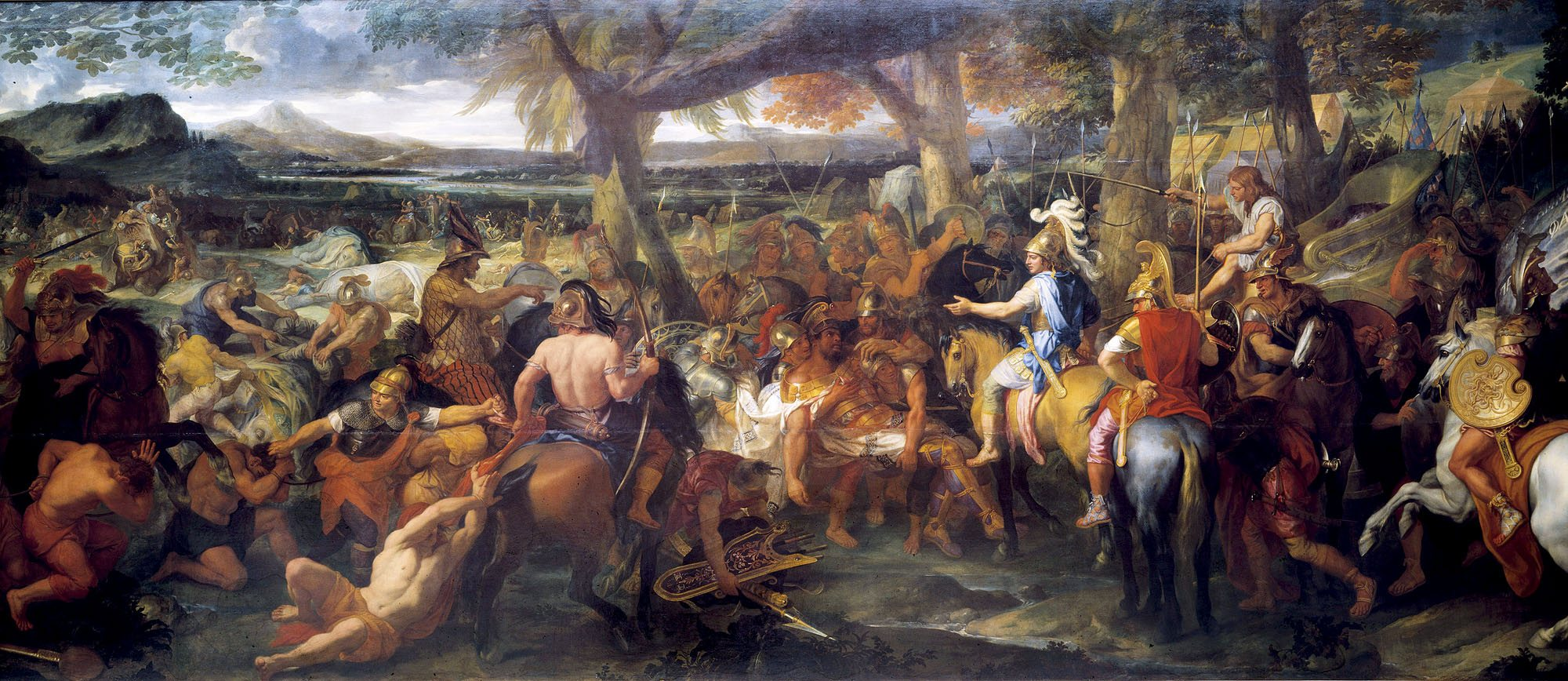
A painting by Charles Le Brun depicting Alexander and Porus during the Battle of the Hydaspes

Alexander re-used the same vessels which were used for crossing the Indus, the first time, some 300 km away at Udabhandapura. His forces frequently mounted intrusion-attempts and even before the battle had started, skirmishes were reported in the riverine islands.

A few months later, Alexander decided to accompany a strike force across the densely forested headlands and besiege Porus' defence; the base camp with substantial cavalry and infantry units was left under Craterus, who was advised to follow Alexander upon a successful passage whilst the remaining forces were distributed along the river under three phalanx officers to distract Porus' forces. The strategy was successful and they crossed the Hydaspes unobstructed, on a stormy night, just before dawn. A band of horsemen on chariots led by Porus' son detected the intrusion and mounted a charge but was repelled by Alexander's cavalry.

Informed of Alexander's passage, Porus became concerned with tackling those who had already crossed, rather than preventing passage of the remaining majority. He took a defensive position in the plains, interspersing infantry units with elephants (Note: Porus had expected the elephant units to negate charges by Alexander's well-trained cavalry.) on the front lines and stationing the cavalry and chariots in the wings. Alexander chose to shield his infantry and instead led a devastating cavalry charge on Porus' left wing, forcing reinforcements from the right; however, this rear-transit came under attack by Coenus' cavalry and Porus' cavalry was compelled to take refuge within the infantry frontlines, causing confusion.

This led to an all-out attack from both sides, but Porus' plans proved futile. According to Heckle (2014), Porus is believed to have had around 30,000 infantry. However, Porus only had 4,000 mounted troops. Not only were Porus' cavalry charges repelled but the mahouts were killed using sarissas and the elephants were pushed back into Porus' columns, wreaking havoc on the rear, Alexander's cavalry kept charging and inflicting disorder. Soon Porus' army was surrounded on all sides, and became easy fodder for Alexander's forces with the cavalry exterminated and most of the elephants captured. Still, Porus refused to surrender and wandered about atop an elephant, until he was wounded and his force routed. A fraction of the infantry successfully escaped and probably planned to regroup but Craterus pursued them to their deaths.

==== Result ====
The battle resulted in Greek victory; however, A. B. Bosworth warns against an uncritical reading of Greek sources, which he claimed to be highly exaggerated. Alexander held athletic and gymnastic games at the site, and even commissioned two cities in commemoration: Nicaea at the site of his victory and Bucephalous at the battle-ground, in memory of his horse. (Note: Craterus supervised the construction. These cities are yet to be identified.) Later, decadrachms were minted by the Babylonian mint depicting Alexander on horseback, armed with a sarissa and attacking a pair of Indian soldiers atop an elephant.

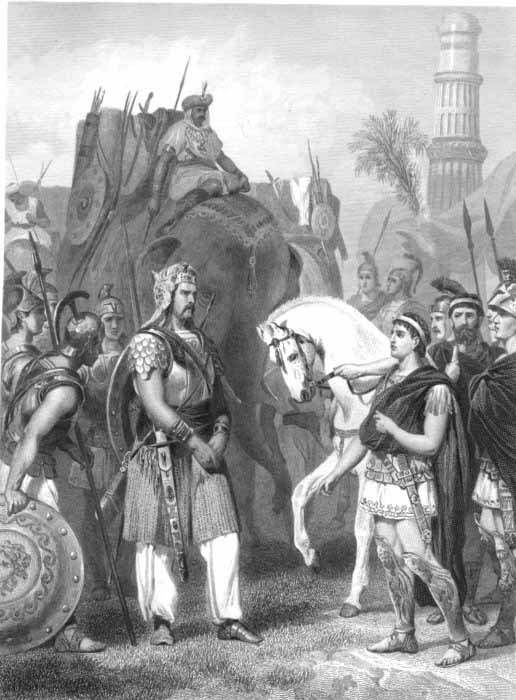
Surrender of Porus to Alexander, 1865 engraving by Alonzo Chappel.

=== Aftermath ===
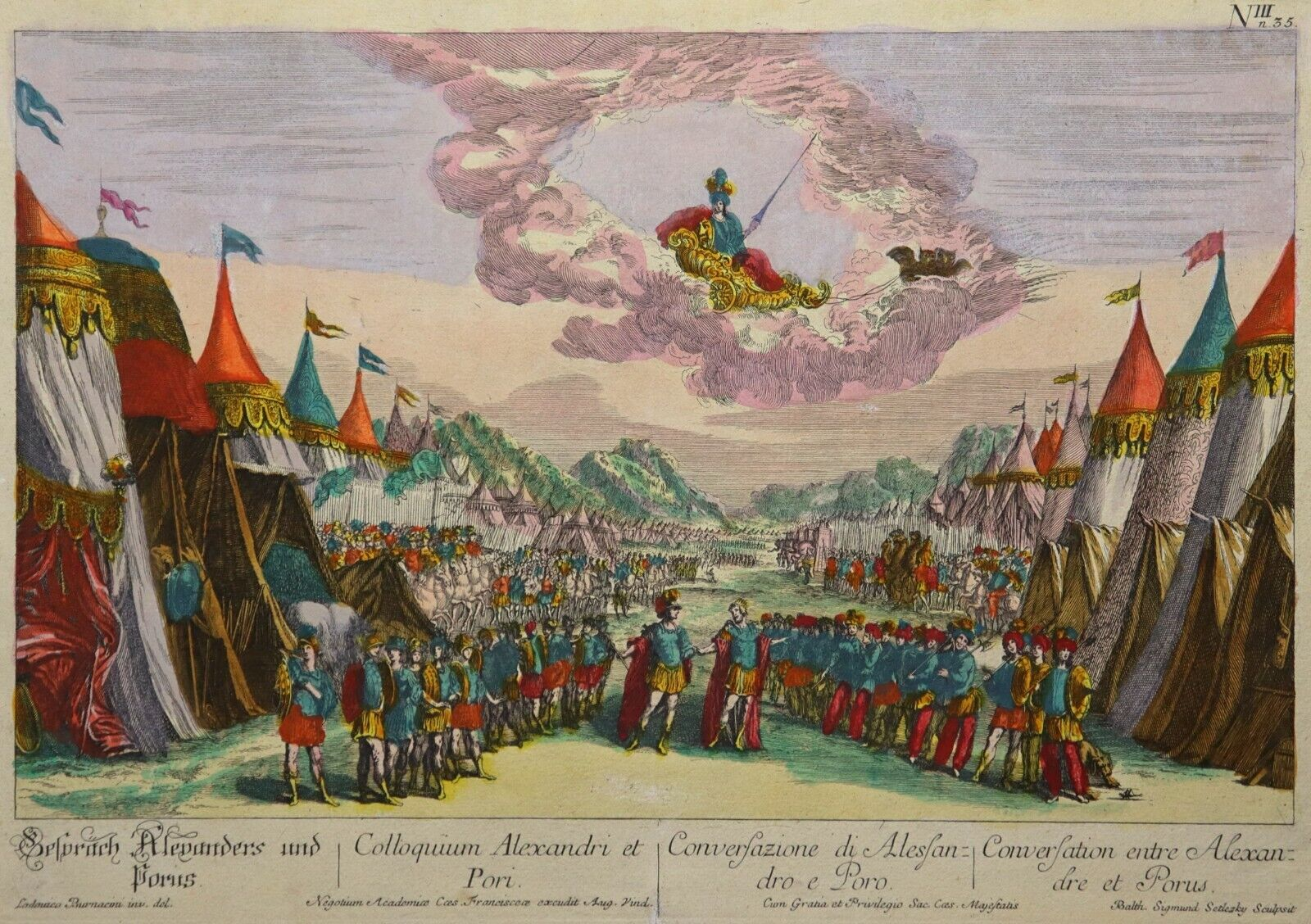
Alexander the Great and King Poros – Opera From Antonio Cesti Burnacini – 1750

Despite the apparently one-sided results, Alexander was impressed by Porus and chose not to depose him. His territory was not only restored, but also expanded, with Alexander's forces annexing the territories of Glausaes, who ruled to the northeast of Porus' kingdom. Further, Omphis was reconciled with Porus.

A joint expedition was then mounted against a territory east of the Acesines, ruled by an enemy cousin of Porus; he had earlier submitted to Alexander although suspicious of Porus' rise in rank, chose to flee with his army. The date of this battle remains disputed; Alexander's forces overran his lands before meeting stiff resistance at a walled Sagala on the other side of the Hydraotes (Ravi River). Siege warfare was executed to brilliant effect and the full-fledged attack began once Porus had joined with his elephants. As Sangala and allied cities were razed, Porus was allowed to station his garrisons.

Thereafter, Alexander proceeded unopposed to the Hyphasis (Beas) and even intended to cross it towards the Gangetic Plain; however, the monsoon was at its peak and his weary troops remained stubborn despite his cajoling and threats. A reluctant Alexander had to renounce his plans and turn back. Porus was thus ratified as the de facto ruler of the entire territory east of the Hydaspes, with no European satrap to co-rule with, unlike Ambhi and Abisares. The crossing-back of the Jhelum was a prolonged affair; filled with festivities, it attracted thousands.

=== Death ===
After the death of Alexander the Great in 323 BC, Perdiccas became the regent of his empire, and after Perdiccas' murder in 321 BC, Antipater became the new regent. According to Diodorus, Antipater recognized Porus' authority over the territories along the Indus River. However, Eudemus, who had served as Alexander's satrap in the Punjab region, killed Porus.

== Cultural depictions of Porus ==
- Porus is defeated by Alexander in single combat in the premodern text, the Alexander Romance.
- Sohrab Modi portrayed Porus in the 1941 movie Sikandar
- Prithviraj Kapoor portrayed Porus in the 1965 movie Sikandar-e-Azam
- Porus is played by Arun Bali in the 1991 TV series Chanakya.
- Porus appears in the 1999 animated series Reign: The Conqueror
- Porus is portrayed by the Thai actor, Bin Bunluerit, in Alexander (2004)
- Porus appears in the 2011 TV series Chandragupta Maurya.
- SET launched Siddharth Kumar Tewary's serial titled Porus on the Battle of Hydaspes in Nov 2017, in which he is referred to his Indian name Purushottam portrayed by Laksh Lalwani.
- Porus appears in the Historical Battle campaign of Rome: Total War: Alexander.
- Porus appears in the video game Ancient Battle: Alexander, in which he is a playable character, as well as an enemy.
- Porus appears in the Chronicles: Alexander the Great expansion of Age of Empires II: Definitive Edition as a playable character as well as an enemy player.

== See also ==
- Indian campaign of Alexander the Great
- Taxiles
- Abisares
- Cleophis
- Pauravas
