= Aornos =

Place associated with Alexander the Great, identified in modern Pakistan

Coordinates: 31°N 74°E

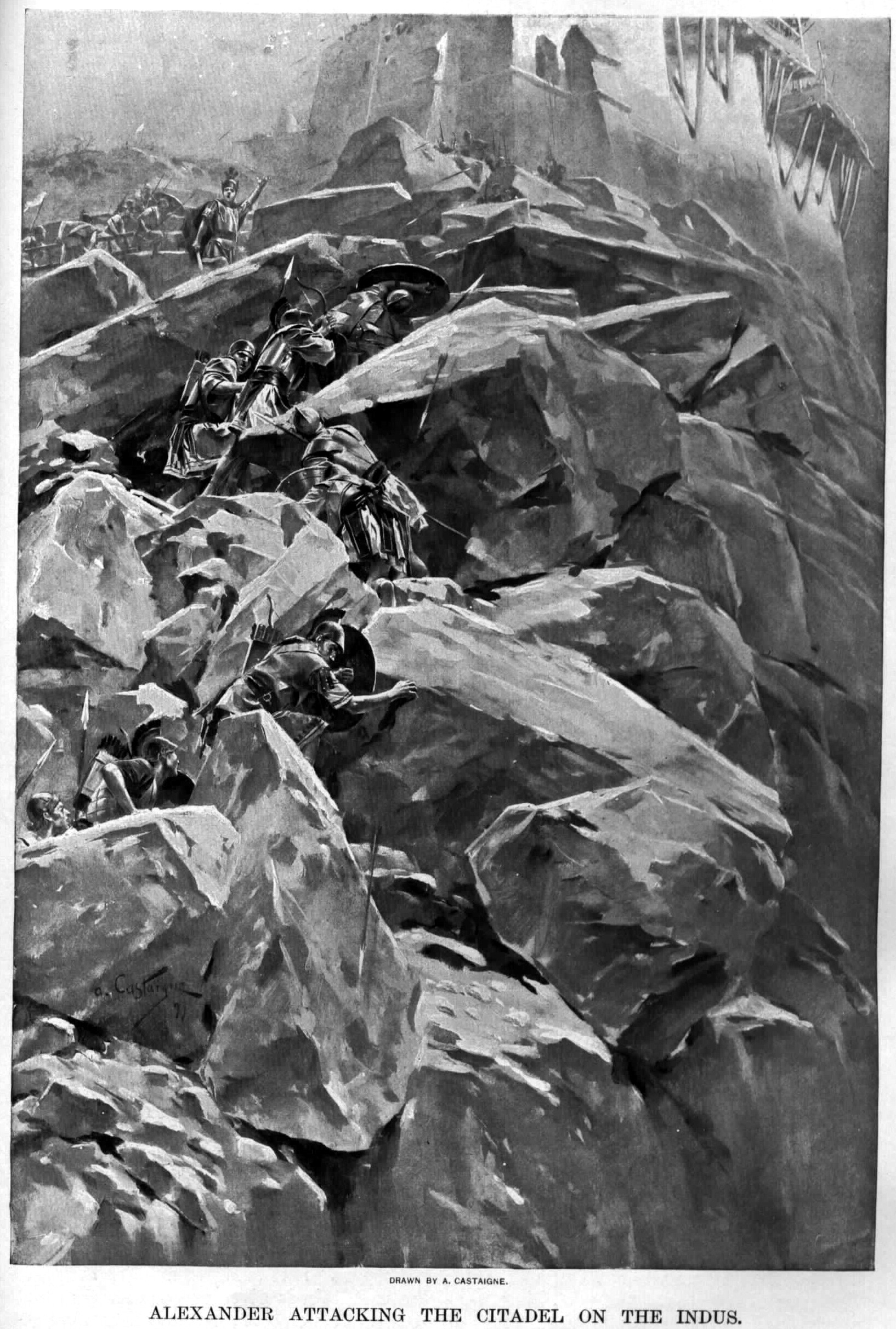
A 19th century painting of the Siege of the Aornos.

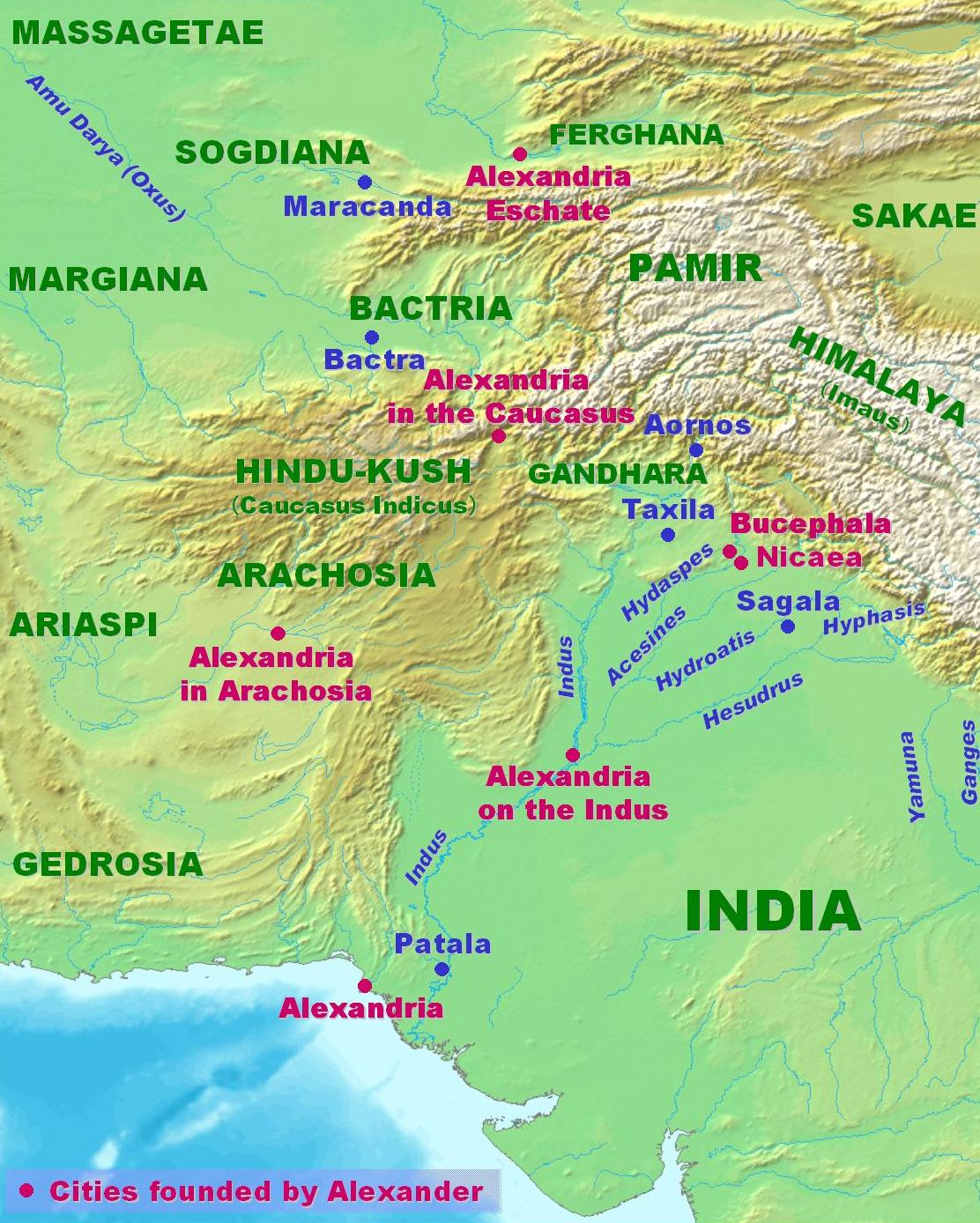
The Aornos is located to the north of Taxila

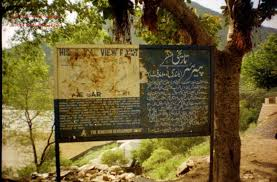
The Rock of Aornos, Shangla District, Khyber Pakhtun Khwa (KPK), Pakistan

Aornos (Ancient Greek: Ἄορνος) was the site of Alexander the Great's last siege, which took place in April 326 BC, at a mountain site located in modern Pakistan. Aornos offered the last threat to Alexander's supply line, which stretched, dangerously vulnerable, over the Hindu Kush back to Balkh, though Arrian (although disbelieving himself of this story) credits Alexander's desire to outdo his kinsman Heracles, who allegedly had proved unable to take a fort that the Macedonians called Aornos (according to Arrian and Diodorus; Aornis according to Curtius; elsewhere Aornus): meaning "birdless" in Greek. According to one theory, the name is a corruption of an Indo-Iranian word, such as *awarana "fortified place". According to Arrian, the rock had a flat summit well-supplied with natural springs and wide enough to grow crops: it could not be starved into submission. Neighboring tribesmen who surrendered to Alexander offered to lead him to the best point of access.

The geographer Aurel Stein suggested that Aornos was located on Pir Sar – a mountain spur above narrow gorges in a bend of the upper Indus River, just to the west of Gunangar Shamshi Khel in the Pakistani Khyber Pakhtunkhwa province. However, the Indologist Giuseppe Tucci has instead proposed a site at the summit of Elum Ghar (Mount Ilam), a site significant in Hinduism, in Khyber Pakhtunkhwa.

Ptolemy and Alexander's secretary Myllinas (rather than the famous Eumenes) reconnoitered and reinforced a neighboring spur to the west with a stockade and ditch. Ptolemy's signal fire to Alexander also alerted the defenders of Pir-Sar, and it took two days of skirmishing in the narrow ravines for Alexander to regroup. At the vulnerable north side leading to the fort, Alexander and his catapults were stopped by a deep ravine. To bring the siege engines within reach, an earthwork mound was constructed to bridge the ravine with carpentry, brush, and earth. The first day's work brought the siege mound 50 metres (55 yd) closer, but as the sides of the ravine fell away steeply below, progress rapidly slowed; nevertheless, at the end of the third day, a low hill connected to the nearest tip of Pir-Sar the Suburb of village Gunangar Shamshi Khel was within reach and was taken. Alexander in the vanguard and his first force were later repelled by boulders rolled down from above. Three days of drumbeats marked the defenders' celebration of the initial repulse, followed by a surprise retreat. Alexander hauled himself up the last rockface on a rope. Alexander cleared the summit, slaying some fugitives (as interpreted by Robin Lane Fox, though inflated by Arrian to a massacre), and erected altars to Athena Nike, Athena of Victory, traces of which were identified by Stein.

Alexander was now free to pursue his journey into Punjab. The devastating Battle of the Hydaspes River, between the forces of Alexander and Porus, occurred the following month, in May 326 BC.
