= Gandhāra Kingdom =

Ancient polity in the north-western South Asia

Gandhāra
- 2nd millennium BCE–c. 535 BCE
- Gandhāra among the Mahājanapadas during the Second Urbanisation
- Capital: Takṣaśilā; Puṣkalāvatī
- Common languages: Prakrits
- Religion: Historical Vedic religion Jainism; Buddhism
- Demonym: Gandhārī
- Government: Monarchy
- Historical era: Iron Age India
  - Established: 2nd millennium BCE
  - Conquered by the Achaemenid Empire: c. 535 BCE
Succeeded by
Ga^{n}dāra (Achaemenid Empire)
- Today part of: Pakistan

Gandhāra (Sanskrit: Gandhāra; Pali: Gandhāra) was an Iron Age Indo-Aryan kingdom of northwestern South Asia. The inhabitants of Gandhāra were called the Gandhārīs. Later Pali Buddhist sources, such as Aṅguttara Nikāya, count it among the sixteen mahajanapadas.

== Geography ==
According to Jataka number 406 (5th–3rd centuries BCE), in the 6th and 5th centuries BCE, the Gandhāra kingdom of the second urbanisation included Takṣaśilā and the valley of Kaśmīra, corresponding to the modern-day Pothohar and Peshawar Valley in Pakistan.

The capital of Gandhāra was Takṣaśilā (Pāli: Takkasilā; Ancient Greek: Τάξιλα, romanized: Táxila), and its other major town was Puṣkalāvatī (Prākrit: Pukkalāoti; Ancient Greek: Πευκελαῶτις, romanized: Peukelaôtis) or Puṣkarāvatī (Pāli: Pokkharavatī).

== History ==
The first mention of the Gandhārīs is attested once in the Ṛgveda (2nd millennium BCE) as a tribe that has sheep with good wool. In the Atharvaveda (2nd–1st millennia BCE) the Gandhārīs are mentioned alongside the Mūjavants, the Āṅgeyas, and the Māgadhīs in a hymn asking fever to leave the body of the sick man and instead go those aforementioned tribes. The tribes listed were the furthermost border tribes known to those in Madhyadeśa, the Āṅgeyas and Māgadhīs in the east, and the Mūjavants and Gandhārīs in the north.

The Gandhārī king Nagnajit and his son Svarajit are mentioned in religious texts, the Brāhmaṇas (dated 8th–6th centuries BCE), according to which they received Brahmanic consecration, but their family's attitude towards ritual is mentioned negatively, with the royal family of Gandhāra during this period following non-Brahmanical religious traditions. According to the Jain Uttarādhyayana-sūtra, Nagnajit, or Naggaji, was a prominent king who had adopted Jainism and was comparable to Dvimukha of Pāñcāla, Nimi of Videha, Karakaṇḍu of Kaliṅga, and Bhīma of Vidarbha; Buddhist sources instead claim that he had achieved paccekabuddhayāna.

During the 6th–5th century BCE, Gandhāra was an important imperial power in north-west Iron Age South Asia with the Valley of Kaśmīra being part of the kingdom; the other states of the Punjab region, such as the Kekayas, Madrakas, Uśīnaras, and Shivis were under Gandhārī suzerainty. Due to this importance, Buddhist texts listed the Gandhāra kingdom as one of the sixteen mahājanapadas ("great realms") of Iron Age South Asia.

Buddhist texts mention a Gandhārī king Pukkusāti, of whom there are no certain historical facts, and who may have ruled before or after the Achaemenid conquest of the Indus Valley.

By the later 6th century BCE, the founder of the Persian Achaemenid Empire, Cyrus, soon after his conquests of Media, Lydia, and Babylonia, marched into Gandhāra and annexed it into his empire as province of Gandāra.

== See also ==
- Sindhu-Sauvīra
- Gandhara (Mahabharata)
- Janapada
- Gandhara grave culture

== Sources ==
- Raychaudhuri, Hemchandra (1953) [1923]. Political History of Ancient India: From the Accession of Parikshit to the Extinction of Gupta Dynasty. University of Calcutta.
- Singh, Upinder (2008). A History of Ancient and Early Medieval India: From the Stone Age to the 12th Century. Pearson Education India. ISBN 978-8131711200.
- Macdonell, Arthur Anthony; Keith, Arthur Berriedale (1912). Vedic Index of Names and Subjects. John Murray.
- Chattopadhyaya, Sudhakar (1978). Reflections on the Tantras. Motilal Banarsidass Publishers.
- Prakash, Buddha (1951). "Poros". Annals of the Bhandarkar Oriental Research Institute. 32 (1): 198–233. JSTOR 41784590.
