= Vahika =

Region of ancient Punjab

Vahika (Bahika)
- 6th century BCE
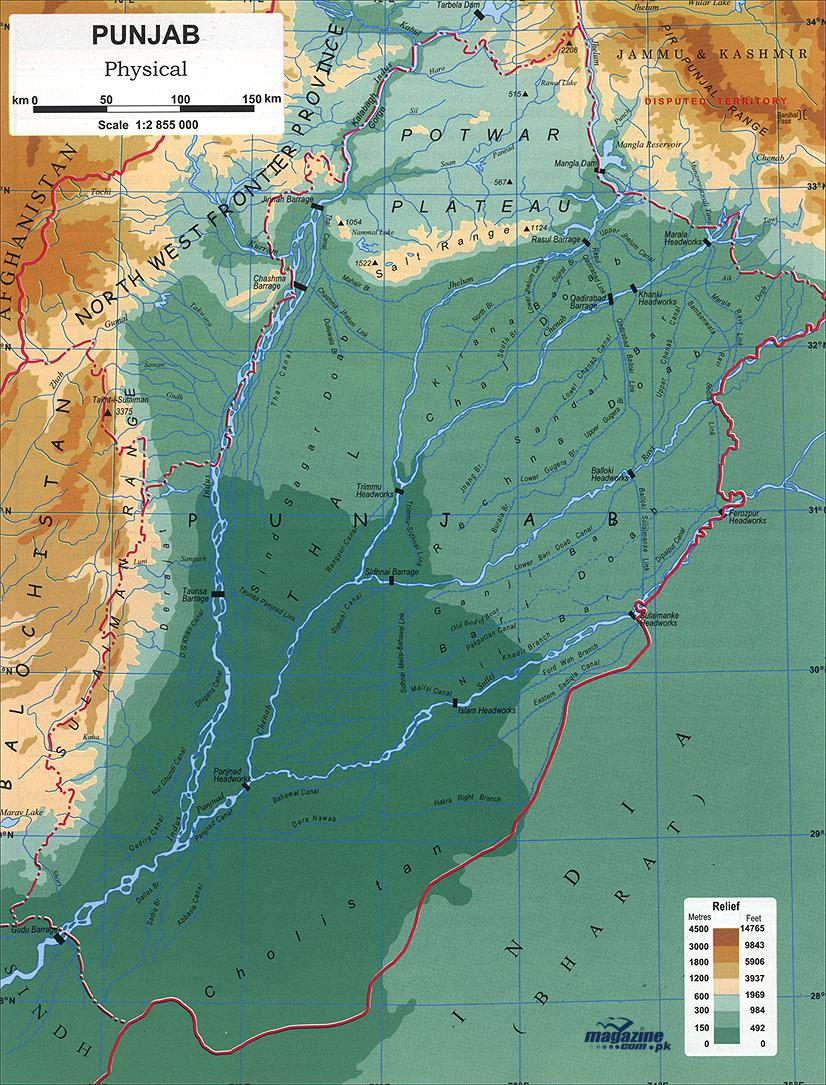
- Capital: Sagala; Taxila; Multan
- Other languages: Gandhari Prakrit; Paisachi Prakrit (Disputed)
- Religion: Buddhism; Hinduism
- Government: Republic
- History
  - Established: 6th century BCE

Vahika, also referred to as Bahika, was an ancient region of Punjab centered between the Indus and the Sutlej rivers. It was inhabited by various Indo-Aryan tribes and kingdoms such as the Madra and Uśīnara with numerous capitals including Multan, Sagala and Taxila. The region has been attested to by multiple authors such as Pāṇini and Patanjali in the late Iron Age and further by Greek writers.

The history of the Vahika region begins in the Vedic era, where the sons of Yayati established prominent kingdoms and tribes that participated in significant events such as the Battle of the Ten Kings and the Kurukshetra War. Vahika is mentioned during this period by writers such as Pāṇini. The region is further documented during Alexander the Great's invasion in 327 BCE, when various tribes, including those led by Porus and the Cathaean tribe, offered substantial resistance to the Greek conquest. In the c. 64 CE, additional details emerge from the visit of Apollonius of Tyana to Vahika, where he encountered Phraotes, the king of Taxila, who ruled over the former territory of Porus. Following the decline of the Kushan Empire in the c. 230 CE, coinage from the Shilada and Gadahara tribes are discovered, and numerous texts from the Hunnic era dated to between the 4th-7th centuries CE attest to numerous tribal republics of the region. In the 7th century CE the region came under the control of the Taank Kingdom.

== Etymology ==
Multiple names have been used in ancient times to refer to the region of Punjab, such as Pentapotamia, in Greek, and Panchanada or Sapta Sindhu, in Sanskrit; however, the definition of Vahika has been understood to mean 'the outsiders' in which the Mahabharata speaks of the region with contempt. They were further referred to as Arattas, which translates to 'Kingless', denoting the republican form of governments that dominated the region.

== Geography ==
During the creation of the Mahabharata, according to the Karna Parva, Vahika was referred to the area between the Indus and the Sutlej rivers and is referred to by Patanjali as Vahikagrama, located in modern-day Punjab. The core Janapadas of the region included the Madra, Kekaya and Uśīnara in which a further tribal republic noted as the Savasa were also located in the area. The Savasa were described as residing between the Jhelum and Chenab Rivers in the north with their capital in Taxila as noted in the Divyavadana whilst the Kekaya resided in the South. The nearby Madras resided between the Chenab and Ravi Rivers in the north whilst the Usinaras were located in the south and are stated to have been associated with the neighbouring Sivi Kingdom whose capital was centred in Shorkot. Patanjali also makes reference to the Audumbara capital, Pathankot, residing in the Vahika region whom were associated with the Trigarta kingdom based on ancient texts.

During Apollonius of Tyana's travels to the region in the 64 CE, he describes the old territory of Porus being under the control of Phraotes, the King of Taxila, which reached the Chenab River of Punjab and Xuanzang's visit in the 7th century CE, states that the Taank Kingdom was located south of Kashmir and north of Sindh extending from the Indus River in the west to the Beas River in the east, centred in Sagala, modern day Sialkot.

The Udichya region was another region mentioned in ancient texts and is noted by Pāṇini as comprising both the regions of Vahika and Gandhara.

== History ==
The first mention of the Vahikas comes from the Gandharan grammarian Pāṇini based in the 6th century BCE in which he describes the region as a territory of Sanghas which denotes a republic form of government. He then further describes the ruling class of the Vahika republics with some dominated by Brahmins and others of ‘Rajanyas’ otherwise known as Kshatriyas. In some Sutras they are recounted as a cradle of martial tribes whose way of life consisted of the military arts. Numerous cities lying in the Vahika country are mentioned by Panini including: Kastira, Sagala, Saubhuta, Kaukudivaha, Svavidgarta, Srigalagarta and Vrikagarta.

=== Vedic era ===
According to Rigvedic tradition, Yayati was the progenitor of the prominent Udichya tribes and had numerous sons, including Anu, Puru, and Druhyu. The lineage of Anu gave rise to the Madra, Kekaya, Sivi and Uśīnara kingdoms, while the Druhyu tribe has been associated with the Gandhara kingdom.

An important event of the Rig Vedic era was the "Battle of Ten Kings" which was fought on the banks of the Ravi River in central Punjab, c. 14th century BCE, between the Bharata clan led by Sudas on the one hand and a confederation of ten tribes on the other. The ten tribes were the Purus, Druhyus, Anus, Turvasas and the Yadus in addition to five minor ones. Sudas was supported by the sage Rishi Vasishtha, while his former Purohita (family priest) Viswamitra, sided with the confederation of ten tribes. A second battle, referred to as the Mahabharat in ancient texts, was fought in Punjab on the battlefield known as Kurukshetra.

=== Achaemenid Era ===
According to Arrian, the Persians in the 6th century BCE did not conquer India but only approached its borders when Cyrus the Great had marched against the Massagetae. He further notes that the Persians had summoned the Oxydrakoi tribe, who resided in the Southern Punjab near Uch, as mercenaries for their armies. The Oxydrakoi were noted by Arrian to have descended from Dionysus due to vine growing in their region and when their kings went to war they marched in the Bacchic fashion with drums beating and wearing 'gay coloured robes'.

Taxila was also governed under the reign of King Pukkusāti who was contemporary to Cyrus the Great. According to Buddhist accounts, he had forged diplomatic ties with Magadha and achieved victories over neighbouring kingdoms such as that of the realm of Avanti. Pukkusāti's kingdom was described as being 100 Yojanas in width, approximately 500 to 800 miles wide, with his capital at Taxila in modern day Punjab as stated in early Jatakas.

=== Alexander's invasion ===
==== Taxiles ====
In the 327 BCE, the sovereign of Taxila, Omphis, formed an alliance with Alexander, motivated by a longstanding animosity towards Porus who governed the region encompassed by the Chenab and Jhelum River. Omphis, in a gesture of goodwill, presented Alexander the great with significant gifts, esteemed among the Indian populace, and subsequently accompanied him on the expedition crossing the Indus. His territory stretched from between the Indus and Jhelum Rivers.

==== Porus ====
Porus ruled over the tracts between the Hydaspes (Jhelum) river and Chenab River and Strabo noted his territory to contain almost three hundred cities whilst also describing his land as fertile and extensive. He is most notable for opposing Alexander in the Battle of the Hydaspes which proved to be one of Alexander the Great's most challenging battles. After his defeat, when asked by Alexander how he wished to be treated, Porus replied "Treat me as a king would treat another king". Impressed, Alexander indeed treated him like a king, allowing him to retain his lands. Following the battle, Alexander founded two cities called Boukephala and Nikaia, the latter at the site of the battle and named after the Greek for Victory, in commemoration of his success, and the former on the opposite bank to honour his faithful steed Bucephalus, who died during or after the battle.

==== Cathaeans ====
Following Alexander's battle with Porus, the Greeks had received information of a tribe known as the Cathaeans preparing for war alongside neighbouring tribes and who were considering taking battle in Sagala, modern day Sialkot. Arrian states that the Cathaeans were skillful in war and were known to Porus after having successfully defeated him previously. Arrian further states that the Cathaeans and other allied tribes had prepared themselves in front of the city upon a hill and after having been defeated encamped themselves in the city leading to a siege and later their eventual defeat.

Strabo describes the culture of the Cathaeans in which they were prized for having beautiful horses and dogs and for choosing the 'handsomest person' as king. The marriage customs were also noted as peculiar to the Cathaeans in that the bride and groom chose their spouse, recounted as the law of the land.

=== Mauryan Empire ===
During the formation of the Maurya Empire between 322-305 BCE numerous mentions of the Vahika republics are stated, most notably in the Arthashastra, written by Chanakya in which he describes the horses coming from the Aratta as of the highest quality of the South Asian nations. He also states that the Madra republic among others lived by the title of Raja and the Kathoi republic among others lived by warfare. According to Buddhist texts, Chanakya was born in the city of Taxila where he had brought Chandragupta Maurya to educate him in numerous arts such as military strategy. This is also confirmed by Plutarch in which he states that Alexander the Great had met with Chandragupta during his invasions. Justin recounts that following the death of Alexander the Great in 323 CE, Chandragupta Maurya had instigated the Indians to rebel against Macedonian rule resulting in the execution of many Greek governors.

According to J. W. McCrindle and the Mudrarakshasa, the army that initially partook in the invasion of the Nanda Empire, following the usurpation of power in the Punjab by Chandragupta Maurya, consisted of tribes and kingdoms of the North-Western region of South Asia in which Justin, a Greek writer from the 2nd century BCE, states that the army of Chandragupta consisted of 'robbers'. McCrindle, hypothesises that these robbers mentioned by Justin to be the republican tribes of the Vahika region and Chanakya even notes that the source of the army were 'Choras' or 'robbers' and described them as the most heroic.

During the Mauryan era, Taxila served as the provincial capital of the North West. Bindusaras reign witnessed a rebellion among the locals of Taxila to which according to the Ashokavadana, he dispatched Ashoka to quell the uprising. Upon entering the city, the populace conveyed that their rebellion was not against Ashoka or Bindusara but rather against oppressive ministers. In Ashoka's subsequent tenure as emperor, he appointed his son as the new governor of Taxila. According to the Taranatha, following the death of Ashoka, the northwestern region seceded from the Maurya Empire, and Virasena emerged as its king. Noteworthy for his diplomatic endeavors, Virasena's successor, Subhagasena, maintained relations with the Seleucid Greeks. This engagement is corroborated by Polybius, who records an instance where Antiochus III the Great descended into India to renew his ties with King Subhagasena in 206 BCE, subsequently receiving a substantial gift of 150 elephants from the monarch. The Vahika region would then come under the fold of the Indo-Greek Kingdom during the reign of Demetrius I in c. 180 BCE.

=== Apollonius of Tyana's visit ===
Approximately 46 CE, Apollonius of Tyana had undergone a distant travel passing through numerous nations such as those of Parthia and Babylonia, and would end up in the region, recounting his journey in his book Life of Apollonius of Tyana. He describes and converses in detail with numerous people such as that of the Oxydrakoi tribe of Southern Punjab whom had previously resisted Alexander the Great's conquest in the 5th century BCE and Phraotes, a king of Taxila. Apollonius recounts that the currency used by the Indians was that of Orichalcum and Bronze, not stamped like that of the Roman and Median coins. On their way to the Indus River, he recounts seeing a group of elephants being chased by huntsment and a child of thirteen years of age riding an elephant whilst urging it on with a crooked rod, upon discoursing with the natives he found that there were three types of elephants, those of the marshes who were 'stupid and idle', those of the mountain who were 'treacherous and malignant' and those of the plains who were 'tractable' and further states that elephants were used by them in war where they would be used as turrets in which ten or fifteen archers and spearmen could fit.

==== Discourse with Phraotes ====
After crossing the Indus River Apollonius' guide had led them to the Satrap of the Indus where they presented a letter from the Parthian king Vardanes I, though, Apollonius writes he was not an officer of his but out of regard for the king had provided Apollonius with resources for his journey and a guide to the Ravi River. He states that the Indus River was 40 stadia in breadth, the natives also disclosed that when the Indus rose, Phraotes would sacrifice black bulls and horses, Apollonius presumes for an abundant harvest. The guide had taken them to the palace of Phraotes whom Apollonious describes as an Indian and a Greek-speaking king of the city of Taxila. The king who fits this date is Sases who is also the nephew of the Apracharaja, Aspavarma, and whose coinage has been dated to between 40 and 78 CE.

He describes Phraotes' residence, Taxila, as being the same size as Nineveh, being walled like a Greek city whilst also being shaped with narrow roads, and further describe Phraotes kingdom as containing the old territory of Porus which spanned between the Jhelum and Chenab Rivers. Outside of the walls of the city was a temple of near 100 feet and was a combination of Greek art with Indian architecture, many columns surrounded the temple and inside were hung copper tablets of Alexander the Great's battle with Porus. The people reportedly told Apollonius of Porus' noble character, that he had only hung these pictures following Alexanders death. The natives are described as wearing cotton produced in the country and sandals made of Papyrus whilst wearing a leather cap in rain, the upper classes on the other hand wore Byssus. Upon entering the city the architecture of Taxila is stated to have been one story in height however they contained underground floors furthermore Apollonius notes seeing The temple of the Sun with statues of Porus and Alexander, walled in red marble.

Following the exchange with the king, Phraotes is reported to have subsidized both barbarians and neighboring states, with the objective of averting incursions into his kingdom. Phraotes also recounts that his father, being the son of a king, had become an orphan from a young age. In accordance with Indian customs, two of his relatives assumed responsibility for his upbringing until they were killed by rebellious nobles during a ritualistic ceremony along the Indus River. This event led to the usurpation of the throne, compelling Phraotes' father to seek refuge with the king situated beyond the Hydaspes (Jhelum) River, in modern-day Punjab, a ruler esteemed greater than Phraotes' father. Moreover, Phraotes states that his father, received an education facilitated by the Brahmins upon request to the king and married the daughter of the Hydaspian king, whilst having one son that was Phraotes himself. Phraotes proceeds to narrate the moment he seized to reclaim his ancestral kingdom, sparked by a rebellion of the citizens of Taxila against the usurpers in which one was already killed. With support from the populace, Phraotes led an entry into the residence of the usurpers, whilst the citizens brandished torches, swords, and bows in a display of unified resistance.

==== Discourse with the Oxydrakoi tribe ====
Apollonius also inquired into the Sophoi tribe whom battled Alexander and asks if they were of the Brahman country to which Phraotes replied that they were not and the Brahmins were the Oxydrakoi tribe of Southern Punjab, identified by Alexander Burnes as residing in Uch, and were 'rather dabblers in philosophy than philosophers' and were a 'free and warlike tribe'. Upon leaving Taxila, Apollonius is recounted to have passed through nine different nations of the Vahika region to reach the Beas River, during this time they reached the battleground of Porus in which a 'triumphant arch' was built whilst also seeing numerous alters built by Alexander. Apollonius describes that when reaching the neighbourhood of the Oxydrakoi tribe the Indian guide ordered his camel to kneel whilst 'sweating with fear', claiming that the people fear them more than they do the King of the country and that the king reportedly consults with them, not doing anything without their advice. The natives were described as having their hair long like the old Macedonians and wearing a white mitre on their head with sleeveless oily white and soft cotton coats. A discussion between Apollonius and the chief of the Oxydrakoi, noted as 'Iarchus', occurs in which numerous topics were reportedly discussed such as Philosophy and history, his throne was described as bronze with golden images.

=== Tribes mentioned by Pliny ===
Pliny the Elder completed his book Natural History in c. 77 CE and noted a list of tribes in the Punjab region spanning from the lower Indus to the mountain tribes near the Hindu Kush.

After passing this island, the other side of the Indus is occupied, as we know by clear and undoubted proofs, by the Athoae, the Bolingae, the Gallitalutae, the Dimuri, the Megari, the Ardabae, the Mesae, and after them, the Uri and the Silae; beyond which last there are desert tracts, extending a distance of two hundred and fifty miles. After passing these nations, we come to the Organagae, the Abortae, the Bassuertae, and, after these last, deserts similar to those previously 'mentioned. We then come to the peoples of the Sorofages, the Arbae, the Marogomatrae, the Umbrittae, of whom there are twelve nations, each with two cities, and the Asini, a people who dwell in three cities, their capital being Bucephala, which was founded around the tomb of the horse belonging to king Alexander, which bore that name. Above these peoples there are some mountain tribes, which lie at the foot of Caucasus, the Soseadae and the Sondrae, and, after passing the Indus and going down its stream, the Samarabriae, the Sambraceni, the Bisambritae, the Orsi, the Anixeni, and the Taxilae, with a famous city, which lies on a low but level plain, the general name of the district being Amenda: there are four nations here, the Peucolaitae, the Arsagalitae, the Geretae, and the Assoi.

— Pliny the elder, Natural history

The Periplus of the Erythraean Sea also dated to the late 1st century CE mentions that the country inland from Bharuch, in modern-day Gujarat, was inhabited by numerous tribes and proceeds to name the Poclais who resided in Boukephala (Jhelum), and the Aratti of Vahika whilst also naming the Gandaraei of Gandhara. The book also describes that Spikenard came through the Poclais to reach Bharuch.

=== Kulutas of Taxila ===
In ancient times, the Kuluta formed a tribal republic with coinage that displays notable similarities to that of the Audumbara and Kuninda tribes, this numismatic resemblance suggests close geographic proximity among the republics, typically associated with the Eastern Punjab.

In Taxila, however, excavated coinage reflects a succession of Kuluta rulers alongside the Apracharajas in the 1st century CE, with the most significant being the silver coin of Virayasa disputed to have been dated between the 1st century CE and the 3rd century CE due to the coinage series produced in the Brahmi script with some Kharosthi remnants. The coinage finds display the names of multiple other rulers such as Vijayamitra, Arya and Satyamitra, whilst also containing the Swastika and Nandipada symbols. The Varāhamihira notes the North-West, situated around Taxila, and the North-East in the Kulu valley as two regions named as Kuluta strongholds, though it is also noted that after the Kushan Empire advance, the coinage of the Taxila Kulutas ceised to exist and the coinage of Virayasa continued in the North-East Punjab.

=== Sialkot legends ===
A popular legend taking origins in Sialkot is that of Raja Sálbán or Sahilvahan after having been published from a Persian manuscript detailing the old rulers of the city, in which Salban is succeeded by his son Raja Rasalu and later by Raja Hodi, dating him to the late 1st century CE. According to Alexander Cunningham the tradition states that Raja Sálbán's father had lost his life battling against the Sakas in the Sindh Sagar Doab leading to Salban establishing a new capital at 'Salbahanpur', identified by Cunningham as Sialkot and would soon after defeat the Sakas near Multan, gaining the title of 'Sakari' or 'foe of the Sakas'. A note in a Kashmir Vanasvali states that Raja Sálbán had invaded Jammu and defeated its ruler whilst also destroying the town, the Raja, named as Shib Prakash, is described as fleeing to the inner mountains and only returning after the death of Salban.

=== Shiladas and Gadaharas ===
Following the downfall of the Kushan Empire in the 3rd century CE, central Punjab East of the Indus River was under the control of two main dynasties, being the Shiladas and Gadaharas. According to numesmatic evidence, they reigned between the periods of c. 230 CE lasting until the conquests of the Kidarite Huns in c. 340 CE. They appear to have ruled successively for nearly a century and of their coinage, numerous kings have been named, for instance, the Shilada coinage notes the kings Bhadra, Bacharna and Pasana whilst the Gadaharas name Peraya and Kirada.

These dynasties origins are unknown however the Puranas note that after the fall of the Satavahana dynasty 'eight Yavana, fourteen Tushara and thirteen Murunda (Saka) chiefs ruled' though the lack of credibility of the Yavana chiefs rule has been acknowledged by scholars such as R. C. Majumdar. These Tushara chiefs may refer to the Little Kushans of the later Kidarite Huns whilst the Murunda may refer to the Western Satraps who are accredited with regaining power after the fall of the Satavahanas beginning with Rudrasena II.

=== Hunnic era ===
In c. 340 CE, the Kidarite Huns initiated incursions into South Asia beginning with the conquest of Gandhara and Punjab. Kidara I has been noted to have appointed satraps to rule over these provinces with 'Varo Shahi', 'Piroch' and 'Buddhabala' being preserved on his coinage. The defeat of the Kidarites by Chandragupta II of the Gupta Empire had led the empire of Kidara I to disintegerate under the rule of his successors. In the first half of the 5th century CE, the names of petty rulers in the Punjab have been deciphered from coinage including: Kritavirya, Siladitya, Sarvayasa, Bhasvan, Khusala and Prakaasa, however the obverse of their coins bare the name of Kidara I implying them to have been Kidarite rulers or those subservient to Kidara previously.

The Gupta Empire, under the leadership of Samudragupta, annexed several northern kingdoms, resulting in various north-western republics paying tribute to him such as the Madra of Vahika based on the Allahabad Pillar inscription. His successful military campaigns in the region of Āryāvarta greatly enhanced his reputation and it is believed that his conquests and the resulting fame were significant factors in persuading frontier rulers and tribes to submit to his authority willingly, without engaging in any hostilities.

(Lines 22–23) (Samudragupta, whose) formidable rule was propitiated with the payment of all tributes, execution of orders and visits (to his court) for obeisance by such frontier rulers as those of Samataṭa, Ḍavāka, Kāmarūpa, Nēpāla, and Kartṛipura, and, by the Mālavas, Ārjunāyanas, Yaudhēyas, Mādrakas, Ābhīras, Prārjunas, Sanakānīkas, Kākas, Kharaparikas and other (tribes)."

— Lines 22–23 of the Allahabad pillar inscription of Samudragupta (r.c.350-375 CE)

The Vishnu Purana dated to between the 5th and 7th century CE during the Hunnic period mentions numerous kingdoms of Vahika such as that of the Madra, the people of Sagala, the Salwa and the Hunas, describing them as enhabiting their borders happy and properous. It was during this era that many notable Chinese Buddhists visited the region such as Faxian c. 399 CE and Xuanzang c. 627 CE who documented their travels. In the travels of Faxian he describes crossing the Indus and entering a country named as ‘Bida’ in the Punjab in which Buddhism was flourishing. The region of Bhida has been described as residing near the Jhelum River.

Song Yun was another Chinese Buddhist monk who was contemporary to the Alchon Hunnic rule of Mihirakula and describes his visit with the king c. 520 CE. The Alchon Hunnic conquest has been dated to 500 CE in which Gandhara was first conquered. He states that Mihirakula's rule was cruel and vindictive with barborous atrocities taking place. He further explains that Mihirakula abode with his troops on his frontier and never returned to his kingdom in which the old had to labour and the common people were oppressed. His capital was also stated to have been at Sagala, modern day Sialkot according to Xuanzang, however Song Yun's tradition states that Gandhara was the capital of his empire and the place he abode. Cosmas Indicopleustes also supports Song Yun's claim and states that 'He is the lord of India and oppressing the people, forces them to pay tribute, the river Phison (Indus) separates all the countries of India from the country of the Huns’. Kalhana in his Rajatarangini describes how Mihirakula oppressed the local Brahmins of South Asia and imported Gandharan Brahmins into Kashmir and India whilst stating that he had given thousands of villages to these Brahmins in Kashmir.

=== Taank kingdom ===
The Taank Kingdom was a kingdom based in Punjab, between the 7th and 9th centuries ruled by the Takkas who are identified as ancient inhabitants of Punjab. The main source regarding the kingdom are the chronicles of Xuanzang as well as other Arab writers. The kingdom was located south of Kashmir and north of Sindh extending from the Indus River in the west to the Beas River in the east, centred in Sagala based on Xuanzang's description of the region.

The earliest Muslim author who mentions the kingdom is a merchant named Sulaiman. He visited the area before 851 AD. In his account, the kingdom is mentioned as Táfak. In 915 AD, the Arab historian Al-Masudi mentions it as at-Tákin, referring to the hills of the Punjab region. The name is read as Tákin by Sir Henry Elliott, and also as Táfan based on Masudi. The account of Sulaimān the merchant calls its king malik at-taqa and further notes that he was in good terms with the Arabs and the Rashtrakuta Empire of the Deccan. Ibn Khordadbeh mentions the king of the confederacy as next in eminence to the Balhara, and Kazwini mentions a fort named Taifand, the location of which agrees with the account of the hill of Sangala.

== See also ==
- History of Punjab
- Madra
- Taank Kingdom
- Gandhara
- Phraotes

== Sources ==
- Agrawala, V.S. (1953), India as known to Panini
- De Beauvoir Priaulx, Osmond, The Indian travels of Apollionus of Tyana
- Frawley, David (2000), Gods, Sages and Kings: Vedic Secrets of Ancient Civilization, Lotus Press, ISBN 978-0-910261-37-1
- Majumder, R.C (1954), Vakataka Gupta age (circa 200-550A.D.)
- Nath Puri, Baij, India In the Time Of Patanjali
