= Shaivya =

Shaivya (Masculine Form: Śaivya; Feminine Form: Śaivyā), also rendered Shaibya, may refer to:

- A person belonging to the ancient Indian tribe or kingdom of Shivi, mainly used in mythological context
  - Shaivya Aushinara, a descendant of King Shibi and ruler of the Shivi kingdom during Kurukshetra War mentioned in the Mahabharata
  - Govasana, another king in the Mahabharata, father-in-law of Yudhishthira
  - Shaivya (wife of Harishchandra), a queen of Koshala in Hindu mythology
  - Mitravinda, a wife of the Hindu deity Krishna
  - Devika (Mahabharata), daughter of Govasana and wife of Yudhishthira
  - Shaivya, mother of Satyavan
- Shaiva, anything relating to the deity Shiva
