= Ashtabharya =

Eight principal wives of Hindu god Krishna

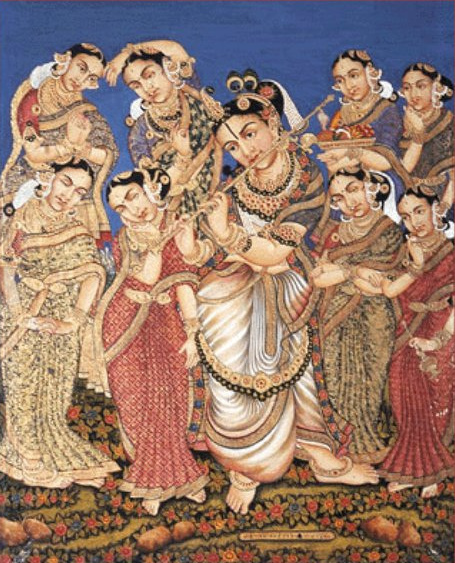
Ashtabharya with Krishna - 19th Century Mysore painting depicting Krishna with his eight principal consorts.

The Ashtabharya (Sanskrit: अष्टभार्या, romanized: Aṣṭabhāryā) or Ashta-bharya(s) is the group of eight principal queen-consorts of Hindu god Krishna, the king of Dvaraka, Saurashtra in the Dvapara Yuga (epoch). The most popular list, found in the Bhagavata Purana, includes: Rukmini, Jambavati, Satyabhama, Kalindi, Nagnajiti, Mitravinda, Lakshmana and Bhadra. Variations exist in the Vishnu Purana and the Harivamsa, which includes queens called Madri or Rohini, instead of Bhadra. Most of them were princesses.

In Hinduism, all of Krishna's chief consorts including Radha are revered as the avatars of the goddess Lakshmi while the Gopis of Braj are considered as Radha's manifestations.

Rukmini, the princess of Vidarbha was Krishna's first wife and chief queen (Patrani) of Dvaraka. She is considered as the avatar of Sridevi, the goddess of prosperity. Satyabhama, the second wife, a Yadava princess, is considered as Lakshmi's aspect of the earth-goddess Bhudevi. Jambavati is believed to be the manifestation of the third aspect of Lakshmi, Niladevi. Kalindi, the goddess of the river Yamuna, is worshipped independently. Besides the Ashtabharya, Krishna had 16,100 ceremonial wives.

The texts also mention the many children Krishna fathered by the Ashtabharya, the most prominent being the crown-prince Pradyumna, son of Rukmini and rebirth of Kamadeva, the god of love.

== Summary ==
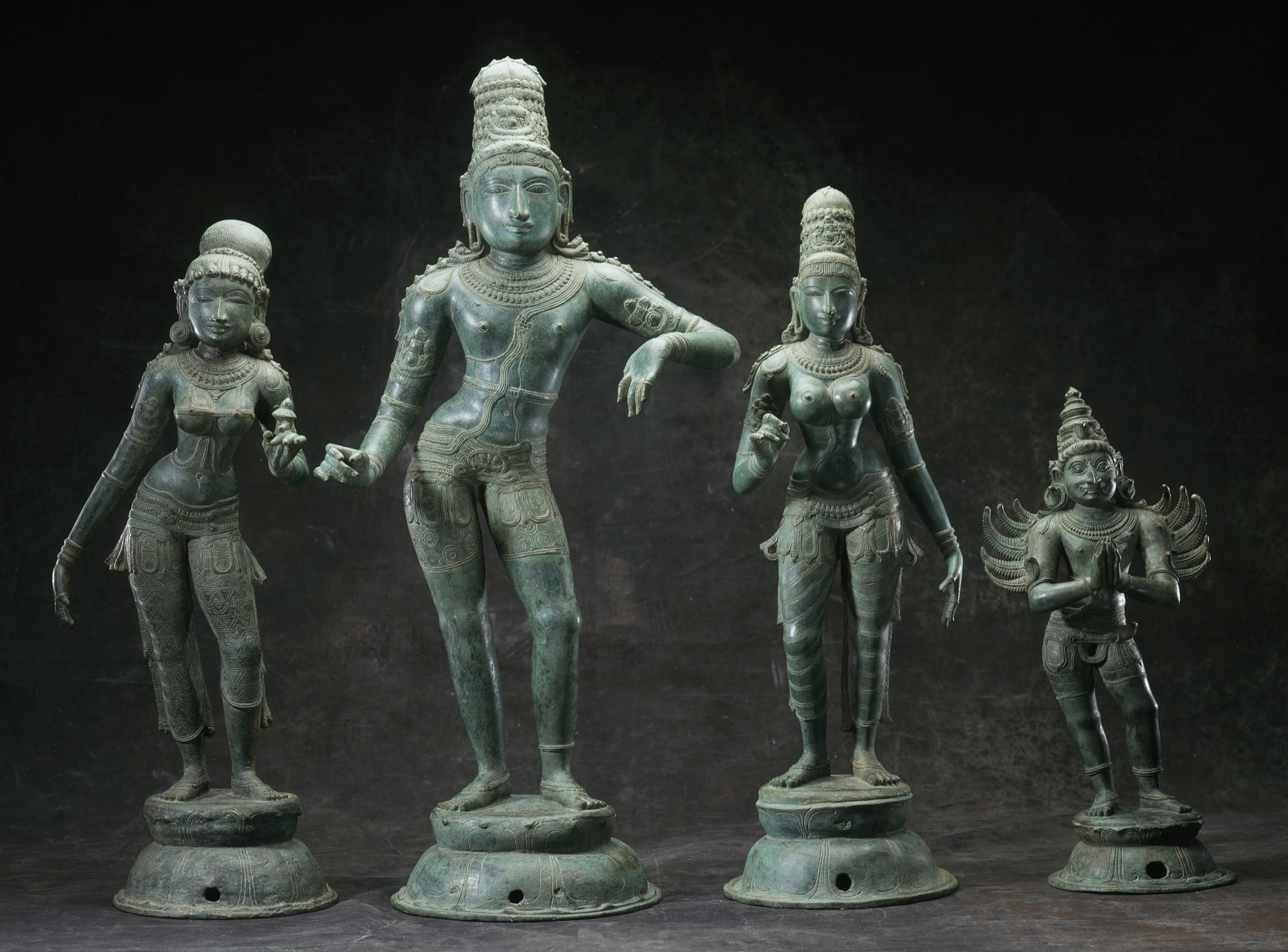
Krishna with his two principal queens. (From left) Rukmini, Krishna, Satyabhama and his mount Garuda.

Key

Not always included in Ashtabharya list

Abbreviations

- General:
  - f: father
  - m: mother
  - d: daughter, unless specified otherwise, child is a son.
  - ?: Statement is disputed
- Scriptures
  - BP: Bhagavata Purana
  - Mbh: Mahabharata
  - VP: Vishnu Purana
  - HV: Harivamsa
  - PP: Padma Purana

Table

Name	Epithets	Region	Parents	Mode of marriage	Attestations	Children
Rukmini	Vaidarbhi, Nagini, Bhaishmaki	Vidarbha	Bhishmaka (f)	Elopement	BP, Mbh, VP, HV	Pradyumna, Charudeshna, Sudeshna, Charudeha, Sucharu, Charugupta, Bhadracharu, Charuchandra, Vicharu and Charu (BP); Pradyumna, Charudeshna, Sudeshna, Charudeha, Sushena, Charugupta, Bhadracharu, Charuvinda, Sucharu, Charu, Charumati (d) (VP); Pradyumna, Charudeshna, Chardudeshna (Same name), Charubhadra, Charugarbha, Sudeshna, Druma, Sushena, Charuvinda, Charubahu, Charumati (d) (HV)
Satyabhama	Suganthi, Vasanthi, Sathrajiti	Dvaraka	Satrajit (f)	Arranged	BP, Mbh, VP, HV	Bhanu, Subhanu, Svarbhanu, Prabhanu, Bhanuman, Chandrabhanu, Savitri, Brịhadbhanu, Atibhanu, Shribhanu and Pratibhanu. (BP); Bhanu, Bhaimarika (VP); Bhanu, Bhimaratha, Rohita, Diptiman, Tamrapaksha, Jalantaka, Bhanu (d), Bhimanika (d), Tamrapani (d), Jandhama (d) (HV)
Jambavati	Narendraputri, Kapindraputri, Pauravi	-	Jambavan (f)	Arranged	BP, Mbh, VP, HV	Samba, Sumitra, Purujit, Shatajit, Sahasrajit, Vijaya, Chitraketu, Vasuman, Dravida and Kratu (BP); Sons headed by Samba (VP); Samba, Mitravan, Mitravinda, Mitravati (d) (HV)
Kalindi	Yamuna, Mitravinda (HV)		Surya (f), Saranyu (m) (BP)	Tapas	BP, VP	Shruta, Kavi, Vrsa, Vira, Subahu, Bhadra, Santi, Darsa, Purnamasa and Somaka (BP); Sons headed by Shruta (VP); Ashruta and Shrutasamhita (HV)
Nagnajiti	Satya, Kausalya	Kosala	Nagnajit (f)	Svayamvara	BP, Mbh (?), VP, HV	Vira, Chandra, Ashvasena, Citragu, Vegavan, Vrsha, Ama, Shanku, Vasu and Kunti (BP); Many sons headed by Bhadravinda (VP); Mitrabahu, Sunitha, Bhadrarakara, Bhadravinda, Bhadravati (d) (HV)
Mitravinda	Sudatta (VP), Shaibya or Shaivya (BP), [Kalindi is given the epithet Mitravinda; Shaibya (Sudatta) is a different queen in HV]	Avanti	Jayasena (f), Rajadhidevi (m) (BP); Shibi (HV)	Svayamvara	BP, Mbh, VP, HV	Vrika, Harsha, Anila, Gridhra, Vardhana, Unnada, Mahamsa, Pavana, Vahni and Kshudhi (BP); Many sons headed by Sangramajit (VP); Sangramajit, Satyajit, Senajit, Sapatnajit, Angada, Kumuda, Shveta and Shvetā (d) (HV)
Lakshmana	Lakshana, Charuhasini, Madri (BP), Madrā (BP)	Madra (BP), unknown (VP, HV), Gandhara	Brihatsena (f) (PP), unnamed (f) (BP)	Svayamvara	BP, Mbh, VP, HV	Praghosha, Gatravan, Simha, Bala, Prabala, Urdhvaga, Mahashakti, Saha, Oja and Aparajita (BP); Many sons headed by Gatravan (VP); Gatravan, Gatragupta, Gatravinda, Gatravati (d) (HV)
Bhadra	Kaikeyi	Kekaya	Dhrishtaketu (f), Shrutakirti (m)	Arranged	BP, Mbh	
Madri	Subhima (HV)	Madra (VP, HV)	-	-	VP, HV	Many sons headed by Vrika (VP); Vrikashva, Vrikanivriti and Vrikadipti (HV)
Rohini	Jambavati (?)	-	-	Protection	BP, VP, Mbh	Diptiman, Tamratapta and others (BP); Diptiman, Tamratapta and others (VP)

== Symbolism ==
The hierarchy of the wives is under three groups according to their regal status and symbolises Krishna's sovereignty. In the first group, Rukmini, an avatar of the Mula Prakriti (Shri), stands for the majesty and wealth of Krishna; Satyabhama, the avatar of the Elemental Prakriti (Bhudevi), represents the kingdom and the realm of the deity as well. Jambavati is Victory (Vijaya), who was won by defeating her father. The second group were representatives of Aryavarta (the nobility) with Kalindi standing for the central kingdoms, Nagnajiti representing the eastern kingdoms (including the Solar dynasty) and Lakshmana representing the western side. The third group of wives consisted of Mitravinda and Bhadra, his patriarchal cousins representing his Yadava clan called Satvata.

== Legends ==
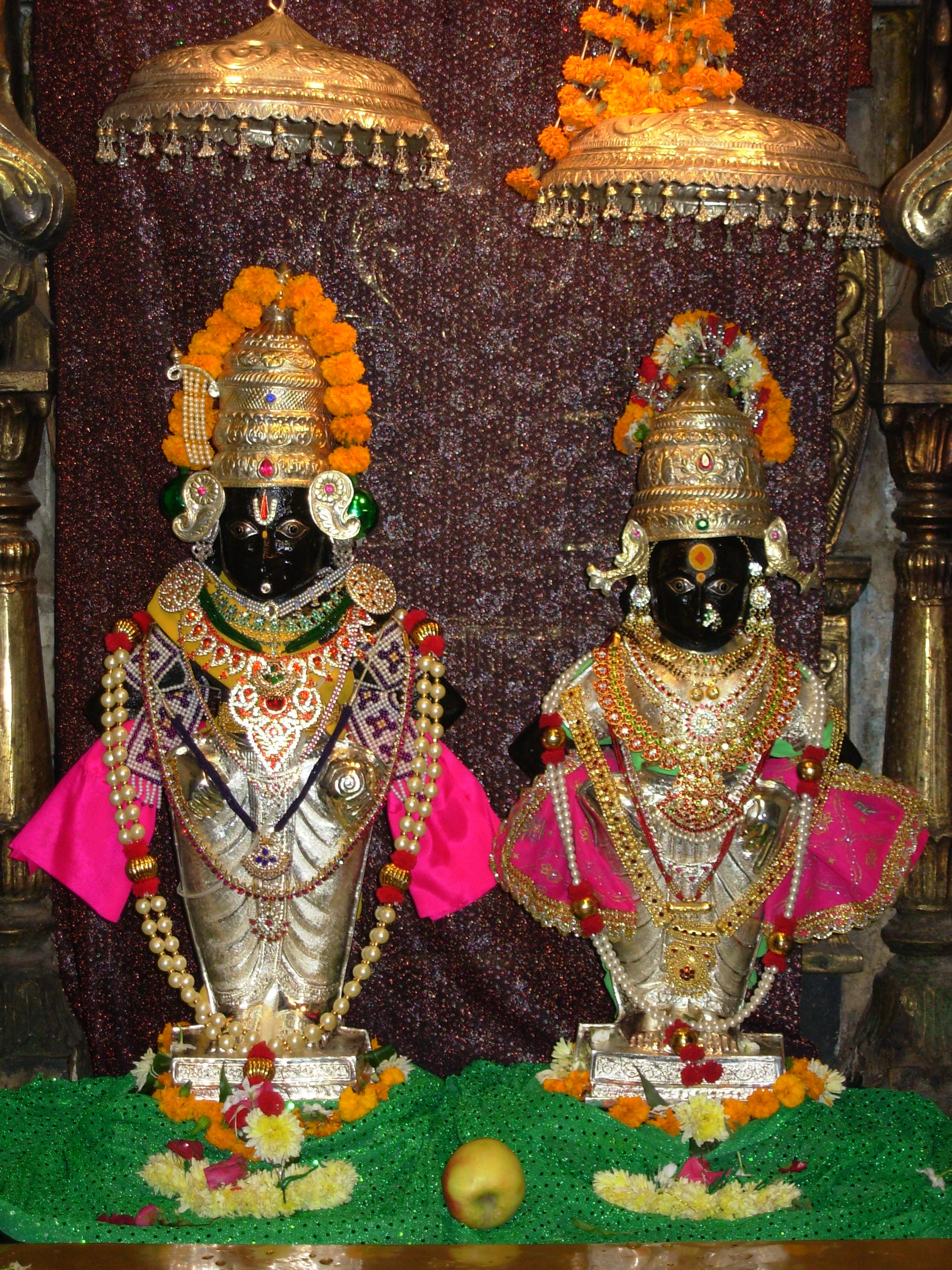
Rukmini as the main consort of Vithoba, a regional form of Krishna.

Rukmini, the chief consort of Krishna, heard the tales of the hero and fell in love with him. While her parents consented to her wedding with her groom of choice, Rukmini's brother Rukmi fixed her marriage with his friend Shishupala. Rukmini sent a message to Krishna to rescue her from her fate and wed her. Krishna abducted Rukmini during her svayamvara, after battling her brother Rukmi. Krishna's army commanded by his brother Balarama defeat Rukmi and the other kings, who follow Krishna and Rukmini. Rukmini is traditionally considered to be the favourite and the primary wife of Krishna, the latter's partiality towards her often provoking the ire of his second consort of Satyabhama.

The marriage of Satyabhama and Jambavati to Krishna is closely linked to the story of Syamantaka, the precious diamond given by the Sun-god Surya to his devotee Satrajit, father of Satyabhama. Krishna requests Satrajit to present the gem to the Yadava elder Ugrasena, which the latter refuses and instead presents it to his brother Prasena. Prasena wears it on a hunting expedition, where he is killed by a lion, who is in turn killed by Jambavan, the bear-king. When accused by Satrajit of stealing the jewel, Krishna goes in its search and finally following trials of the corpses of Prasena and the lion, confronts Jambavan. After 27/28 day duel, Jambavan - the devotee of Rama (Vishnu's previous avatar) - surrenders to Krishna, who he realizes is none other than Vishnu. He returns the gem and gives Jambavati to Krishna. When the presumed dead Krishna returns to Dvaraka, a humiliated Satrajit begs his forgiveness and offers Satyabhama's hand in marriage along with the jewel.

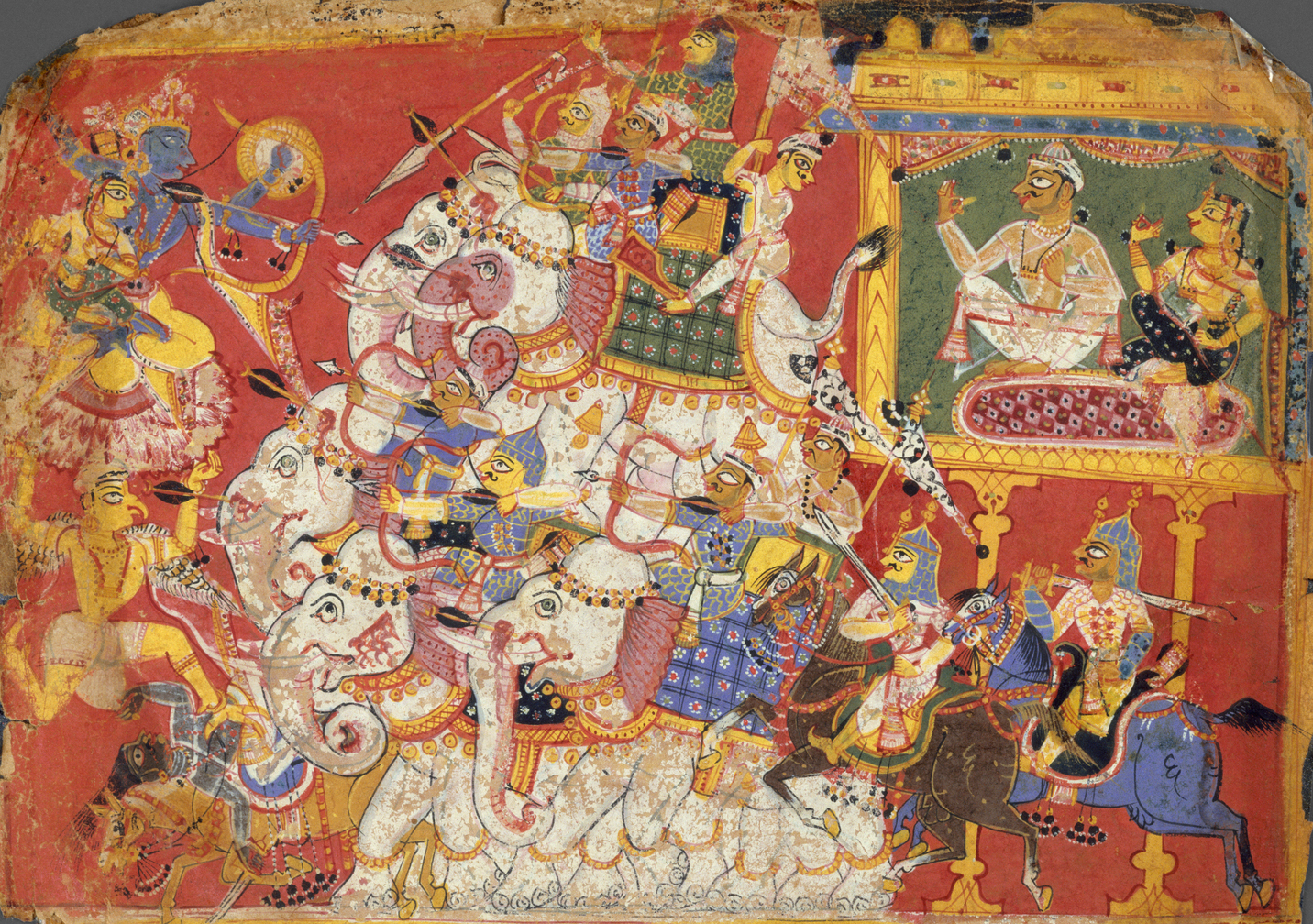
Krishna and Satyabhama fighting Narakasura's armies -Painting from the Metropolitan Museum

Among the queens, Satyabhama is depicted to be the most beautiful and loving wife. Not only was Satyabhama a very courageous and strong-willed woman, but she was also skillful in archery. She even accompanied Krishna to kill the demon Narakasura. While Krishna kills the demon in Krishna-oriented scriptures, Satyabhama, the manifestation of Bhudevi - the mother of Narakasura, kills the demon to fulfil a curse that he will be killed by his mother in Goddess-centric texts. At Satyabhama's behest, Krishna also defeats Indra, the king of heaven and the gods and gets the celestial parijata tree for her after he had previously acquired it for Rukmini.

In Folk Traditions

Indian folktales often tell stories of Krishna's competing wives, especially Rukmini and Satyabhama. A tale narrates how once Satyabhama, proud of her wealth, donated Krishna to the divine sage Narada and pledged to take him back by donating wealth to him as much as Krishna's weight. Krishna sat on one pan of a weighing scale and Satyabhama filled the other pan with all of the wealth, inherited from her father, but it could not equal Krishna's weight. The other wives, except Rukmini, followed suit but Krishna's pan did not leave the ground. The wives requested Satyabhama to approach Rukmini. A helpless Satyabhama asked her foremost rival, Rukmini, for help. Rukmini had no wealth of her own. She chanted a prayer and put the holy tulasi leaf in the other pan, as the symbol of her love; removing the wealth of Satyabhama and the other queens from the pan. Krishna's pan was suddenly lifted into the air and the other pan touched the earth, even though only a tulasi leaf in it.

In Scriptures

Unlike folk traditions that depict rivalry, scriptures describe Satyabhama and Rukmini as close companions. The Bhagavata Purana refers to Rukmini as Satyabhama's priya sakhi (dear friend), showing mutual respect rather than conflict.

The Tulabharam (weighing scale) event, often misrepresented in folklore, is mentioned in texts such as the Padma Purana and Vishnu Dharmottara Purana. However, it was not a result of Satyabhama's pride or a test of her devotion, but rather a ritualistic ceremony performed as part of a sacred observance.

According to the scriptural version, during a grand ritual, Krishna was to be weighed on a Tulabharam (sacred weighing scale) as part of a traditional offering. Satyabhama, as one of Krishna's principal wives, took the responsibility of performing the ritual. She followed the custom of offering gold and jewels to match Krishna's weight, as per the prescribed religious rites. However, despite adding immense treasures, Krishna's side of the scale remained heavier.

Recognizing that divine presence cannot be measured by material wealth, Satyabhama prayed with humility and faith. Following the ritual guidance of the sages, she placed a single tulsi leaf on the scale, invoking her pure devotion. Instantly, the scale balanced, emphasizing the spiritual principle that bhakti (devotion) holds greater value than material riches.

This version contrasts with later folk traditions, where Satyabhama is wrongly portrayed as being overconfident and needing Rukmini's help. In the scriptural account, she successfully completes the ritual on her own, reaffirming her devotion to Krishna and the divine significance of the Tulabharam ceremony. The Devi Bhagavata Purana describes a version where Satyabhama, in a moment of passion, tied Krishna to a tree and gifted him to Narada, later redeeming him by paying an equivalent weight in gold.

In the scriptures, Krishna's wives are described as having a harmonious and sisterly relationship rather than rivalry. The Bhagavata Purana and other texts emphasize their devotion to Krishna and mutual respect.

== See also ==
- Ashta Lakshmi
- Junior wives of Krishna
- Ashtasakhi
- Gopi
