= Vinda and Anuvinda of Avanti =

Kings in Hindu mythology

In-universe information
- Affiliation: Kauravas
- Family: Rājādhidevī (mother); Jayasena (father); Mitravinda (sister)
- Relatives: Krishna (maternal cousin), Vasudeva (maternal uncle)
- Origin: Avanti

Vinda and Anuvinda are two characters in the ancient Indian epic Mahabharata. They were brothers, who co-ruled the kingdom of Avanti. They were close allies of the Kauravas and during the Kurukshetra War, they fought from their side and were ultimately killed by the Pandava hero Arjuna. According to Bhagavata Purana, they also had a resentment toward their cousin Krishna, stemming from his marriage to their sister Mitravinda and his alliance with the Pandavas.

== Family ==
Vinda and Anuvinda were members of the royal family of Avantī. Their mother, Rājādhidevī, was the sister of Vasudeva, father of Krishna, which made them Krishna’s cousins. According to the Bhāgavata Purāṇa, they also had a sister, Mitravinda, who wanted to marry Krishna. Vinda and Anuvinda were comrades of Duryodhana, the leader of the Kauravas. They were therefore opposed to the idea of Mitravinda marrying Krishna, since he had allied with the Pandavas, Kunti's sons, and rivals of the Kauravas. Krishna eloped with Mitravinda during a svayaṃvara (self-choice ceremony), which the brothers opposed. Vallabhacharya's commentary on the Bhagavata Purana adds that the brothers wanted Duryodhana as her husband.

== In the Mahabharata ==
According to Sabhā Parva, before the Pāṇḍava king Yudhishthira performed the Rājasūya yajña, Sahadeva, the youngest Pāṇḍava, embarked on a military campaign to subjugate the southern kingdoms. During this expedition, Sahadeva defeated both Vinda and Anuvinda.

Vinda and Anuvinda later aligned themselves with Duryodhana, the eldest Kaurava prince, attested in the Udyoga Parva. They contributed an akṣauhiṇī (a large military division) to the Kaurava army during the Kurukshetra War. Their valor was praised by Bhishma, the commander-in-chief of the Kaurava army, who described Vinda as a rathi (noble warrior). Vinda was later appointed one out of ten generals of Kaurava army.

Vinda and Anuvinda fought on various days of the Kurukshetra War and engaged in battles with key warriors from the Pāṇḍava army. On the first day of the war, the brothers fought against King Kuntibhoja, an maternal grandfather of the Pāṇḍavas. Vinda and Anuvinda later attacked Iravan, the son of Arjuna and Ulupī, but were defeated. The brothers helped Shalya, the King of Madra, when he was surrounded by Shveta, the prince of Matsya. Vinda and Anuvinda also fought against Bhima, Arjuna, and Virata during the later stages of the war. Both brothers were ultimately slain by Arjuna. Anuvinda was killed during a fierce battle, and Vinda was also struck down by Arjuna in the same confrontation.

== Other pairs of brothers named Vinda and Anuvinda ==
The Mahabharata mentions other pairs of brothers with the same names. These include two of Dhritarashtra’s 100 Kaurava sons were named Vinda and Anuvinda. Vinda and Anuvinda were also the name of Kekaya princes, who also supported the Kauravas.
