= Bhadra (Krishna's wife) =

Eighth queen consort of Hindu god Krishna

- Member of Ashtabharya
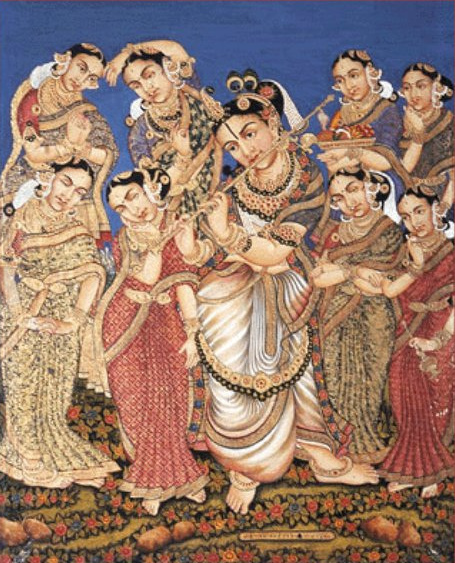
- Bhadra and the other Ashtabharya of Krishna, Mysore painting.
- Affiliation: Devi, Ashtabharya, Lakshmi
- Abode: Dvaraka
- Texts: Bhagavata Purana, Mahabharata

Genealogy
- Parents: Dhrishtaketu (Father) Shrutakirti (Mother)
- Spouse: Krishna
- Children: Sangramajit, Brihatsena, Shura, Praharana, Arijit, Jaya, Subhadra, Vama, Ayur, and Satyaka (sons)
- Dynasty: Yaduvamsha (by marriage)

Bhadra (Sanskrit: भद्र, romanized: Bhadra, lit. 'fortunate') is one of the Ashtabharya, the eight principal queen-consorts of Hindu god Krishna, according to the scripture Bhagavata Purana. The Bhagavata Purana regards her as being the eighth wife of Krishna; sometimes she is described as the seventh wife. The Vishnu Purana and the Harivamsa do not name Bhadra at all in the list of the Ashtabharya, but refer to her as 'the daughter of Dhrishtaketu' or 'the princess of Kekeya'.

== Legend ==
The Bhagavata Purana gives her the epithet Kaikeyi, the princess of the Kaikeya kingdom. She was the daughter of King Dhrishtaketu and his wife Shrutakirti, the sister of Kunti and the sister (or cousin) of Vasudeva (Krishna's father) and thus Krishna's cousin. Bhadra's five brothers headed by the eldest prince Santardana married Bhadra to Krishna. In another text, she is described to have chosen Krishna as her husband in a Svayamvara ceremony, in which a bride chooses a groom from assembled suitors. Krishna and his queens once visited Hastinapura to meets Kunti, her sons the Pandavas and Pandavas's common wife Draupadi. As directed by Kunti, Draupadi worships and honours Bhadra and other queens with gifts. Bhadra also narrates to Draupadi how she married Krishna.

According to the Bhagavata Purana, Bhadra had ten sons, namely Sangramajit, Brihatsena, Shura, Praharana, Arijit, Jaya, Subhadra, Vama, Ayur, and Satyaka. The Mausala Parva of the Hindu epic Mahabharata which describes the death of Krishna and end of his race and the Bhagavata Purana records the wailing of Bhadra and other seven chief queens and her subsequent leap in Krishna's funeral pyre immolating themselves (see sati). While Bhagavata Purana says all queens committed sati, the Mahabharata mentions only four, including Bhadra.

== In popular culture ==
A book titled Bhadra Kalyanam (meaning: a marriage of Bhadra) was written in Telugu language by Dr.K.V.KrishnaKumari. She dedicated this book to Satya Sai Baba on his 80th birthday. In this book, she describes Bhadra as Mahalakshmi (wife of Vishnu) and her marriage with Krishna, as his seventh wife, as "the confluence of beauty, devotion and love”.
