= Lakshmana (Krishna's wife) =

Seventh queen consort of Hindu god Krishna

- Member of Ashtabharya
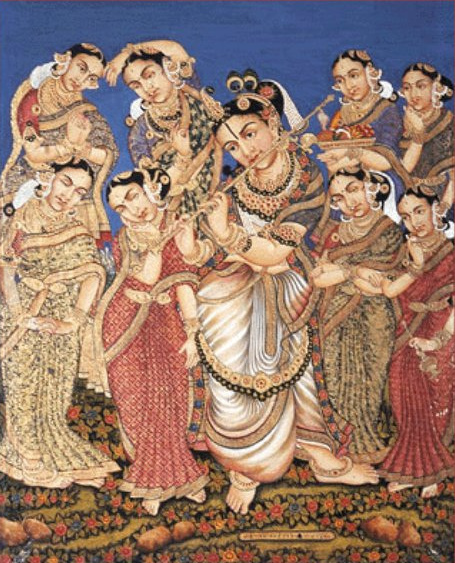
- Lakshmana and the other Ashtabharya, Mysore painting.
- Other names: Madri, Charuhasini
- Affiliation: Devi, Lakshmi, Ashtabharya
- Abode: Dvaraka
- Texts: Vishnu Purana, Bhagavata Purana, Harivamsa, Mahabharata

Genealogy
- Spouse: Krishna
- Dynasty: Yaduvamsha (by marriage)

Lakshmana (Sanskrit: लक्ष्मणा, romanized: Lakṣmaṇā) or Lakshana is the seventh of the Ashtabharya, the eight principal queen-consorts of Hindu god Krishna, an avatar of the god Vishnu and the king of Dvaraka in the Dvapara Yuga (epoch).

== Family and names ==
The Bhagavata Purana mentions Lakshmana, who is endowed with good qualities, as the daughter of an unnamed ruler of the kingdom of Madra. The Padma Purana specifics the name of the king of Madra as Brihatsena. Lakshmana describes Brihatsena to be a good veena player in a dialogue. Some texts give her the epithet Madri or Madrā ("of Madra"). However, the Vishnu Purana includes Lakshmana in the Ashtabharya list, but mentions another queen Madri, who is explicitly mentioned as the princess of Madra. The lineage of Lakshmana is not alluded to in the text. The text also calls her Charuhasini, one with a lovely smile. The Harivamsa also calls her Charuhasini, but is not associated with Madra and another queen called Madri or Subhima is mentioned like the Vishnu Purana.

== Marriage ==
Lakshmana's father had organized a svayamvara ceremony, in which a bride chooses a groom from assembled suitors. The Bhagavata Purana mentions that Krishna abducts Lakshmana from the svayamvara, just like the demigod-eagle Garuda had stolen the jar of the elixir of life (amrita) from the gods. Another tale describes how Krishna wins Lakshmana in the svayamvara, by acing an archery contest. The kings Jarasandha and Duryodhana miss the target. The Pandava prince and Krishna's cousin Arjuna, described as the best archer at times, missed his aim knowingly at the target with the arrow so that Krishna could win the hand of Lakshmana. Arjuna's brother Bhima refused to participate in deference to Krishna. Ultimately, Krishna wins by hitting the target. Krishna and his queens once visited Hastinapura to meet the Pandavas and their common wife, Draupadi. The proud and shy Lakshmana tells Draupadi that her marriage was also very exciting like Draupadi’s and narrates its tale.

== Children and death ==
The Bhagavata Purana states that she had ten sons: Praghosha, Gatravan, Simha, Bala, Prabala, Urdhvaga, Mahashakti, Saha, Oja, and Aparajita. The Vishnu Purana says that she has many sons headed by Gatravan.

The Bhagavata Purana records the wailing of Krishna's queens and their subsequent leap in Krishna's funeral pyre immolating themselves (see sati). The Mausala Parva of the Hindu epic Mahabharata which describes the death of Krishna and end of his race declares that only four committed, others kill themselves by burning themselves alive after being attacked by robbers.
