= Pushkarasarin =

6th-century BCE ruler of Indian state of Gandhara

Pushkarasarin (Sanskrit: Puṣkarasārin) or Pukkusati (Pali: Pukkusāti) was a king of the Iron Age Indo-Aryan kingdom of Gandhāra during the time of Gautama Buddha (c. 6th or 5th century BCE), according to Buddhist texts which were written a few centuries later. There are no historical facts known for certain about Puṣkarasārin, and all theories about his reign are speculative. It is debated whether he ruled before or after the Achaemenid conquest of the Indus Valley, and is unknown what kind of relationship he historically had with the Persian Achaemenid rulers.

== Reign ==
Buddhist narratives written a few centuries later indicate that Puṣkarasārin became the king of Gandhāra at a time when this state was an important imperial power in north-west Iron Age South Asia, with the other states of the Punjab region, such as the Kekayas, Madras, Uśīnaras, and Shivis being under the suzerainty of Gandhāra.

Puṣkarasārin engaged in expansionist ventures which brought him into conflict with the king Pradyota of the rising power of Avanti. Puṣkarasārin was successful in this struggle with Pradyota, but this led to a war between him and the Pāṇḍava tribe located in the Punjab region, and who were threatened by his expansionist policy. Puṣkarasārin also engaged in friendly relations with the king Bimbisāra of Magadha, who married Kṣemā, the daughter of the king of Madra, who was a vassal of Puṣkarasārin.

By the later 6th century BCE, the founder of the Persian Achaemenid Empire, Cyrus, soon after his conquests of Media, Lydia, and Babylonia, marched into Gandhara and annexed it into his empire. The scholar Kaikhosru Danjibuoy Sethna advanced that Cyrus had conquered only the trans-Indus borderlands around Peshawar which had belonged to Gandhāra while Puṣkarasārin remained a powerful king who maintained his rule over the rest of Gandhāra and the western Punjab.

However, according to the scholar Buddha Prakash, Puṣkarasārin might have acted as a bulwark against the expansion of the Achaemenid Empire into north-west South Asia. This hypothesis posits that the army which Nearchus claimed Cyrus had lost in Gedrosia had in fact been defeated by Puṣkarasārin's Gāndhārī kingdom. Therefore, following Prakash's position, the Achaemenids would have been able to conquer Gandhāra only after a period of decline of Gandhāra after the reign of Puṣkarasārin combined the growth of Achaemenid power under the kings Cambyses II and Darius I. However, the presence of Gandhāra, referred to as Ga^{n}dāra in Old Persian, among the list of Achaemenid provinces in Darius's Behistun Inscription confirms that his empire had inherited this region from conquests carried out earlier by Cyrus.

Assuming that Puṣkarasārin lived during the 6th century BCE, it is unknown whether he remained in power after the Achaemenid conquest as a Persian vassal or if he was replaced by a Persian satrap (governor), although Buddhist sources claim that he renounced his throne and became a monk after becoming a disciple of the Buddha.

However, with alternative chronologies which date the Buddha's lifetime (and his contemporary kings) as much as a century later, it is alternatively possible that Puṣkarasārin in fact lived as much as a century after the Achaemenid conquest. Among scholars who favour the latter chronology, it remains an open question for debate, what kind of relationship Puṣkarasārin historically had with the Persian Achaemenid rulers. Possible theories are: he "may belong to a period when the Achaemenids had already lost their hold over Indian provinces," or he may have been holding power in eastern parts of Gandhara such as Taxila (speculatively considered by some scholars to be outside the Achaemenid dominions), or may have been serving as a vassal of the Achaemenids but with autonomy to conduct warfare and diplomacy with independent Indian states, similar to the "active and often independent role the western satraps had in Greek politics". Thus it is considered that he may have been an important intermediary for cultural influence between Ancient Persia and India.

== See also ==
- Nagnajit
