= Nagnajiti =

Fifth queen consort of Hindu god Krishna

- Member of Ashtabharya
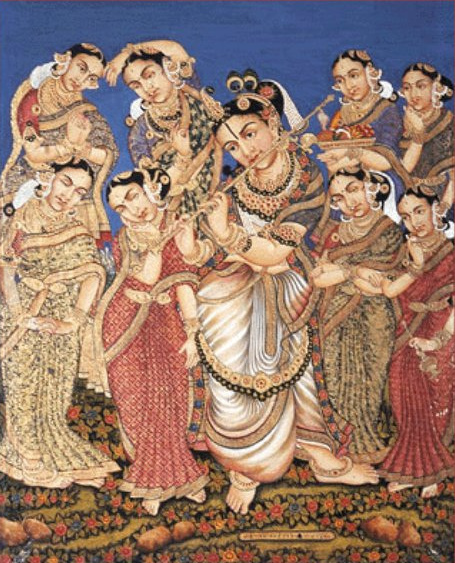
- Nagnajiti and the other Ashtabharya of Krishna, Mysore painting.
- Other names: Satya, Nappinnai
- Affiliation: Devi, Avatar of Niladevi, Ashtabharya, Lakshmi
- Abode: Dvaraka
- Texts: Vishnu Purana, Bhagavata Purana, Harivamsha, Mahabharata

Genealogy
- Parents: Nagnajit (father)
- Spouse: Krishna
- Children: Vira, Chandra, Ashvasena, Chitragu, Vegavan, Vrisha, Ama, Shanku, Vasu, and Kunti
- Dynasty: Suryavamsha, Yaduvamsha (by marriage)

Nagnajiti (Sanskrit: नाग्नजिती IAST: Nāgnajitī), also known as Satya (Sanskrit: सत्या IAST: Satyā), and Nappinnai (Tamil: நப்பின்னை, lit. 'beautifully-tressed'), is the fifth of the Ashtabharya, the eight principal wives of the Hindu god Krishna.

In Vaishnava texts, Nagnajiti is said to be an incarnation of Niladevi, the third aspect of Lakshmi. During the Dvapara Yuga, Niladevi was born on the earth as Satya, the daughter of King Nagnajit of Kosala. Krishna competed in the svayamvara arranged by Nagnajit, and as per the set rules, he brought seven ferocious bulls under control by tying a noose around each of them, thus winning Satya as his wife.

In South India, when the poet-saint Andal wrote the Tiruppavai and the Nachiyar Tirumoli, she mentions Nappinai, the "beautifully tressed" daughter of King Nagnajita - the brother of Yashoda (foster-mother of Krishna). It is believed that Nappinai is the Tamil equivalent of Nagnajiti. This is attested by the fact Nappinai is also stated to be a form of Vishnu's consort, Niladevi.

== Family ==
The Vishnu Purana, the Bhagavata Purana and the Harivamsa call her Satya Nagnajiti. Commentators often consider Satya as her birth name and Nagnajiti a patronymic, translated "the daughter of Nagnajit(a)". However, sometimes it is translated as Nagnajiti, "the virtuous" (meaning of the word Satya). Her father Nagnajit was the king of Kosala, whose capital was Ayodhya. Nagnajit is described as Kosala-pati ("Lord of Kosala") and Ayodhya-pati ("Lord of Ayodhya"). The Bhagavata Purana also calls Nagnijiti by the epithet as Kausalya, "belonging to Kosala" ascertaining her role as princess of Kosala. A wife of Krishna named Satya is mentioned in the Mahabharata.

== Legend ==
=== Marriage ===
The Bhagavata Purana narrates the tale of Nagnajiti's marriage. Nagnajit, also known as Kumbagan, was a pious king who followed the Vedic scriptures with great devotion. He had set condition for the marriage of Satya that her husband should win her by defeating his seven ferocious bulls in combat. However, no prince who challenged to do the task could control the seven bulls to win the hand of Satya. Upon learning of the challenge, Krishna set out for Kosala Kingdom with a large retinue. As Krishna approached Nagnajit in his court, the king rose from his throne and honoured Krishna with gifts and welcomed him warmly to Kosala. Naganjiti was also very joyful to see Krishna and prayed that Krishna be her husband. Both the king and his daughter were aware of Krishna's divinity. Nagnajit offered his veneration to Krishna and asked the purpose of his visit. When Krishna declared that he wished to marry Satya, the King stated that there would no better husband for his daughter, but he had taken a vow that he would marry his daughter to a brave prince who would bring the seven bulls under control. The king also praised Krishna's valour and told him that he could easily tame the seven bulls which had almost mauled the other princes who had tried.

Upon listening to the king, Krishna entered the arena expanding into seven forms and easily put a noose around the seven bulls, humbling them. King Naganajit was pleased with the outcome, and his daughter was delighted to take Krishna as her husband. The marriage was celebrated with pomp and grandeur. The king presented Krishna with a dowry of 10,000 cows, 9,000 elephants, 900,000 chariots, 90,000,000 female, and 9,000,000,000 male servants. Finally, Krishna and Satya departed towards Dvaraka, accompanied by their army to protect them. On the way, they were attacked by the princes who had lost in Nagnajit's bull challenge. Krishna's army, fielded by his Yadava clan warriors and his friend Arjuna, defeated the princes and chased them away. Krishna then entered Dvaraka in glory accompanied by his wife Naganajiti.

=== Later life ===
Nagnajiti has ten sons: Vira, Chandra, Ashvasena, Citragu, Vegavan, Vrsha, Ama, Shanku, Vasu, and Kunti. The Vishnu Purana says that she has many sons by Bhadravinda. The Bhagavata Purana, which describes the death of Krishna and end of most of his race, records the leap of Nagnajiti and other chief queens onto Krishna's funeral pyre, immolating themselves.
