= Taank Kingdom =

Early medieval kingdom in the Punjab

- c. 7th century–c. 10th century
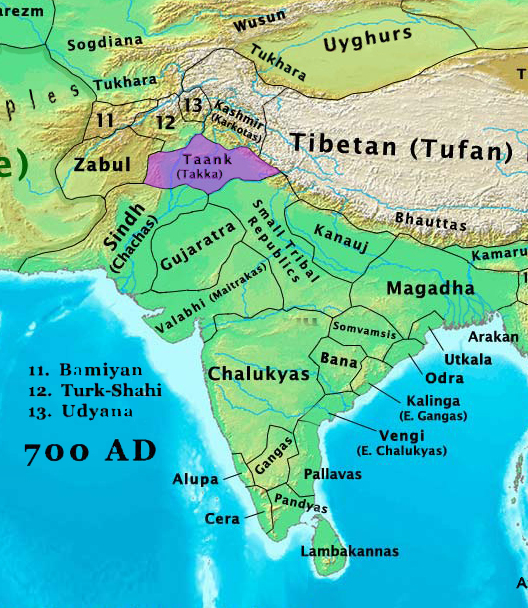
- Taank Kingdom shown in violet in the north of the Indian subcontinent, c. 700 CE.
- Religion: Hinduism
- Government: Monarchy
- History
  - Established: c. 7th century
  - Disestablished: c. 10th century
- Today part of: Pakistan; India

Taank Kingdom (also known as Takka, Taki, Tseh-kia, Takkadeśa, Takeshar and other variants) was a kingdom based in Punjab from 7th to 10th centuries CE. It was located south of Kashmir and north of Sindh, extending from the Indus in the west to the Beas in the east. Its capital was the city of Sagala (modern day Sialkot).

== History ==
Takka kingdom was called as Tseh-kia or Zhejia (磔迦) by the Chinese pilgrim Xuanzang, who visited it in 629–645 CE. According to him, the kingdom stretched from river Beas in its east to the Indus in the west, and the states of Mülasthanapura (Multan) and Bofadou or Parvata (near modern Sialkot) were its vassals. According to Hermann Goetz, the Gurjara Takkadeśa was a "buffer vassal state" of the Pratihara dynasty and Gurjara princes of Takkadeśa used titles of Turkic origin, for example, Ālakhāna, originating from Il-Khān. He further considers Gujars as descendants of Gurjaras.

Xuanzang further noted that it produced abundant quantities of non-sticky rice and wheat, also gold, brass, iron and other metals. Despite having an illustrious Buddhist heritage as evident from three colossal stupas, Buddhism had declined in the region, and later collapsed after the Alchon Hun persecution, resulting in it being sparsely practised in only about ten monasteries. On the contrary, Brahminical Hinduism rose as the primary religion in the region and there were several hundreds of Hindu Deva shrines.

Hyecho, a Korean Buddhist monk from Silla, also visited the kingdom in the early 8th century. He recorded its name as Takshar or Zhashe (吒社), and located it to the west of Jālandhara. However he found many Buddhist monasteries, with king and commoners alike believing in the three jewels.

The earliest Muslim source to mention the kingdom is Akhbār al-Ṣīn wa’l-Hind, written in 851–52, and traditionally attributed to a merchant named Sulaiman. He calls the kingdom al-Ṭāqā. According to his account the ruler of the kingdom lived peacefully with its neighbours and was in good terms with the Arabs and the Rashtrakuta Empire of Deccan. He described the women of the kingdom as most beautiful of all Hind. Several scholars have identified Takka kingdom with the kingdom of al-Usaifan, located between Kashmir, Multan and Kabul. Its king is reported by al-Biladhuri to have converted to Islam during the reign of caliph al-Mu'tasim (r. 833–842).

In 915, the Arab historian al-Masudi mentions it as at-Tákin, referring to the hills of the Punjab. In Hudud al-Alam, an anonymous geographical treatise written in 982, the kingdom is called Tāqi and is described as "a country with populous towns". In the Rajatarangini of Kalhana (12th century CE), the kingdom is called Takka-désa while al-Biruni in his Kitab al-Hind calls it Tākēshar, located in the vicinity of Kashmir. The Chachnama (history of Sindh) mentions it as Tak. The Lawik dynasty of Ghazni is also believed to have belonged to the Takka people.

== See also ==
- History of Punjab

== Bibliography ==
- Bosworth, C.E., ed. (1970). Hudud al-'Alam: The Regions of the World. Translated by Minorsky, V. (second ed.). London: Luzac & Co. OCLC 615158224.
- Sīrāfī, Abū Zayd Ḥasan ibn Yazīd (2017). F. Kennedy, Philip (ed.). Accounts of China and India. Library of Arabic literature. Translated by Mackintosh-Smith, Tim. New York: New York University Press. ISBN 978-1-4798-3059-6.
- Xuanzang (1996). The Great Tang Dynasty Record of the Western Regions. BDK English Tripiṭaka. Translated by Rongxi, Li (1. print ed.). Berkeley, California: Numata Center for Buddhist Translation and Research. ISBN 978-1-886439-02-3.
- Whitfield, Roderick, ed. (2012). Korean Buddhist Culture: Accounts of a Pilgrimage, Monuments, and Eminent Monks. Collected Works of Korean Buddhism. Vol. 10. Seoul, Korea: Jogye Order of Korean Buddhism. ISBN 978-89-94117-17-1.
- Cunningham, Alexander (1871). The Ancient Geography of India: I. The Buddhist Period, Including the Campaigns of Alexander, and the Travels of Hwen-Thsang. Munshiram Manoharlal. pp. 150–154. ISBN 9788121510646.
- Goetz, Hermann (1955). The Early wooden temples of Chamba. Brill. ISBN 9789004643963.
