= Mitravinda =

Sixth queen consort of Hindu god Krishna

- Member of Ashtabharya
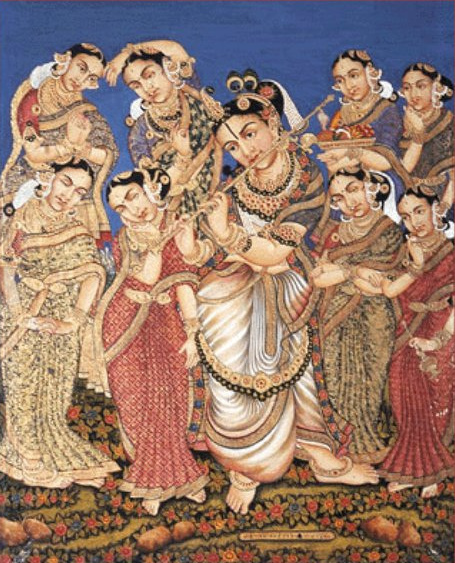
- Mitravinda and the other Ashtabharya of Krishna.
- Other names: Shaibya, Sudatta
- Affiliation: Devi, Ashtabharya, Lakshmi
- Abode: Dvaraka
- Texts: Vishnu Purana, Harivamsa, Bhagavata Purana

Genealogy
- Parents: Jayasena (father); Rajadhidevi (sister of Vasudeva) (mother)
- Siblings: Vinda and Anuvinda (brothers)
- Spouse: Krishna
- Children: Vrika, Harsha, Anila, Gridhra, Vardhana, Unnada, Mahamsa, Pavana, Vahni, and Kshudhi.
- Dynasty: Yaduvamsha (by marriage)

Mitravinda (Sanskrit: मित्रविन्दा, romanized: Mitravindā) is chronologically the sixth of the Ashtabharya of the Hindu god Krishna, an avatar of the god Vishnu, and the king of Dvaraka in the Dvapara Yuga (epoch).

== Etymology ==
Mitravinda was known by the epithet "the virtuous" and called as Shaibya or Shaivya (meaning daughter/descendant of King Shibi/Shivi) in the Vishnu Purana. Ratnagarbha, a commentator on the Vishnu Purana, identifies Mitravinda with Kalindi, another chief queen of Krishna. In Harivamsa, she is referred to as Sudatta, the daughter (or patrilineal descendant) of Shibi.

== Family ==
In the Bhagavata Purana, Mitravinda is described as the daughter of King Jayasena of the kingdom of Avanti. The Bhagavata Purana describes that she had two brothers Vinda (Vindya) and Anuvinda (Anuvindhya), who ruled Avanti as co-regents at the time of her wedding. They were comrades of Duryodhana, the leader of the Kauravas. They were therefore opposed to the idea of Mitravinda marrying Krishna, since he had allied with the Pandavas, Kunti's sons, and rivals of the Kauravas.

== Marriage ==
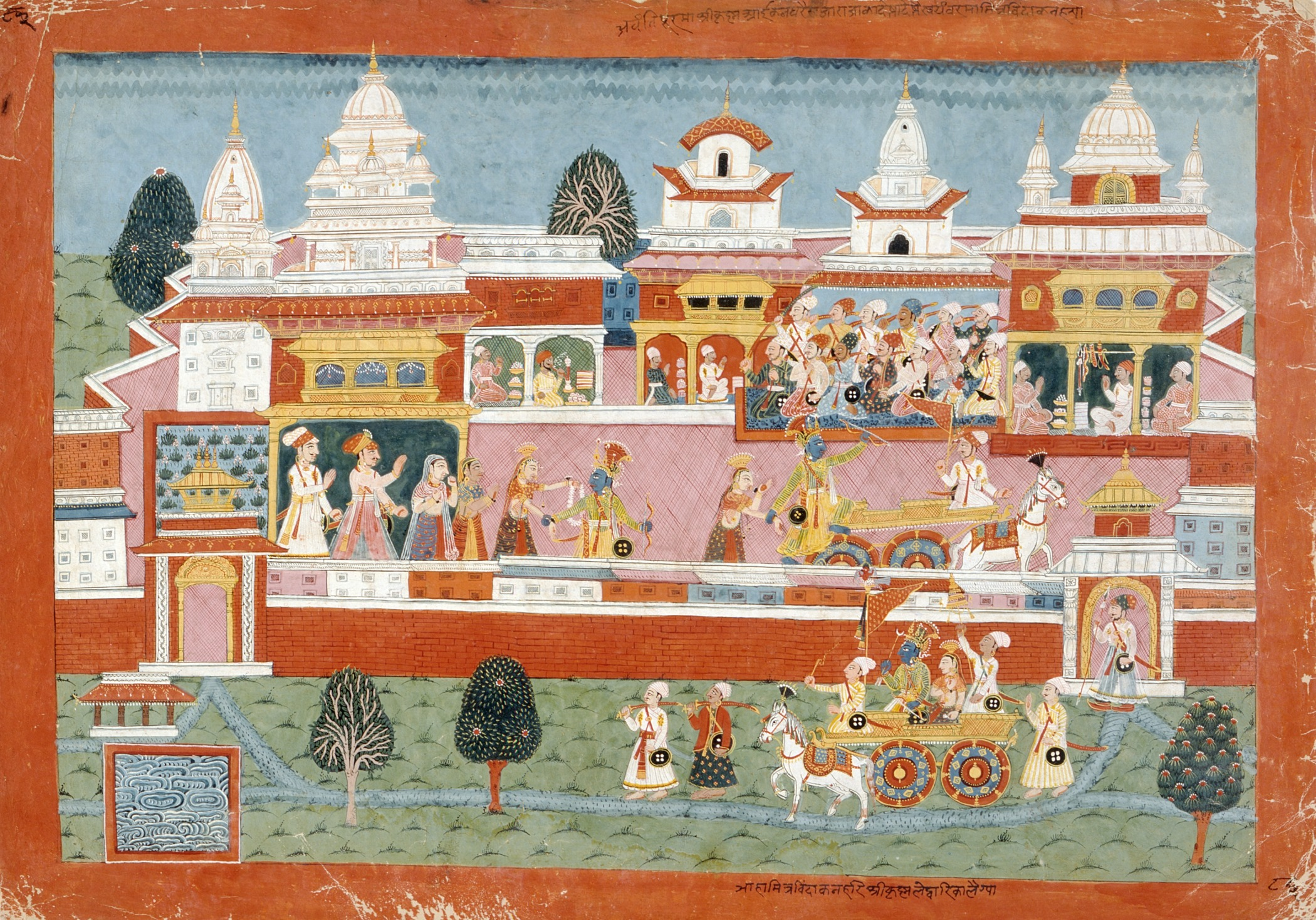
Krishna elopes with Mitravinda.

The Bhagavata Purana records a short description of Mitravinda's marriage to Krishna. She chooses Krishna as her husband in a svayamvara ceremony, in which a bride chooses a groom from assembled suitors. However, her brothers do not like it and forbid the marriage. They join forces with the Kauravas and fight Krishna. Krishna defeats the princes and takes Mitravinda away, as the other suitors keep looking. Vallabhacharya's commentary on the Bhagavata Purana adds that Mitravinda and Krishna were deeply in love with each other, but her brothers and father were opposed to this and wanted Duryodhana for her husband. A svayamvara was arranged by her father for her to choose a husband. All the princes including Duryodhana were present for this competition. When Krishna learned of this, he also came to the venue of the svayamvara and Mitravinda appraised Krishna of her problem and requested him to abduct her. Complying with her wishes, Krishna abducted her from the venue of the svayamavara. He was challenged by her brothers, Duryodhana and other princes who wanted to marry Mitravinda. Krishna defeated all of them and took Mitravinda to Dvaraka where he formally married her.

In another version, Krishna and his elder brother, Balarama, are described to be intentionally not invited for the svayamvara. Balarama was upset that they had been excluded from the marriage of their cousin Mitravinda. Balarama had also conveyed to Krishna that the svayamvara was a ruse as Vinda and Anuvinda wished to marry their sister to Duryodhana of the Kuru Empire. The marriage would forge an alliance between Kuru and Avanti and also garner the support of Vidarbha and Magadha Kingdoms, which make the Kauravas very powerful. Balarama told his younger brother to abduct Mitravinda as she loved Krishna. As Krishna was not sure of the love of Mitravinda, he took his younger sister Subhadra along with him to quietly ascertain the wish of Mirtravinda. After Subhadra confirmed Mitravinda's love for Krishna, Krishna and Balarama stormed the svayamvara venue and abducted Mitravinda, defeating the princes of Avanti, Duryodhana, and other suitors.

== Later life ==
Krishna and his queens once visited Hastinapura to meet Kunti, her sons, the Pandavas and Pandavas' main Queen consort Draupadi. As directed by Kunti, Draupadi worships and honours Mitravinda and other queens with gifts. Mitravinda also narrates to Draupadi how she married Krishna.

The Bhagavata Purana tells that Mitravinda had ten sons: Vrika, Harsha, Anila, Gridhra, Vardhana, Unnada, Mahamsa, Pavana, Vahni, and Kshudhi. The Vishnu Purana says that she has many sons headed by Sangramajit.

The Bhagavata Purana records the wailing of Krishna's queens and their subsequent leap in Krishna's funeral pyre immolating themselves. The Mausala Parva of the Hindu epic Mahabharata which describes the death of Krishna and end of his race declares that Mitravinda (Shaivya) killed herself by burning alive after being attacked by robbers while leaving Dvaraka after Krishna's funeral.
