= Uśīnara =

Ancient people in north-western Punjab

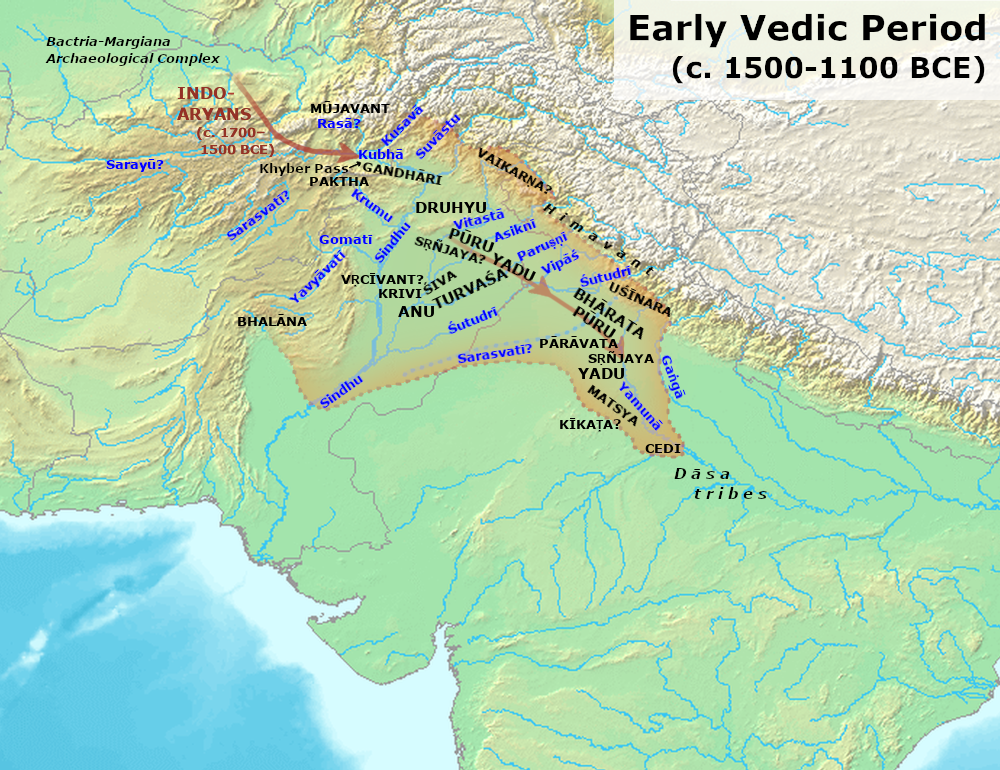
Location of the Anu tribe from which the Uśīnaras were descended among the Vedic tribes

Location of the Uśīnaras during the post-Vedic period

Ushinara (Sanskrit: Uśīnara) was an ancient Indo-Aryan tribe of north-western South Asia whose existence is attested during the Iron Age.

== Location ==
The Uśīnaras lived in the northernmost part of the Madhya-deśa, with the Uśīnara-giri ("Uśīnara mountain") being located near Kanakhala.

== History ==
The Uśīnaras, as well as the neighbouring Kekaya and Madra tribes, were descended from the Ṛigvedic Anu tribe which lived near the Paruṣṇī river in the central Punjab region.

A queen of Uśīnara, named Uśīnarāṇī, is mentioned in the Ṛgveda.

== In mythology ==
The Uśīnaras appear in epic Hindu literature, especially in the Rāmāyaṇa and the Mahābhārata.
