= Madhyadesha =

Subdivision of ancient India

Madhyadesha or the "middle country" was one of the five sub-divisions of ancient India that extended from the upper reaches of the Ganga and the Yamuna to the confluence of the two rivers at Prayaga. The territory of middle region constitutes a cogent entity—geographically as well as culturally. Inside northern India (ancient Aryavarta) this region has been instrumental in guiding the main currents of history and the spread of civilization from a very early age.

Historically, Madhyadesha was dominated by Kannauj or Kanyakubja which made Kannauj the centre and cultural capital of Madhyadesha and surrounding Aryavarta.

From sixth century BCE, the history of this region can be properly recovered. The entire region is considered sacred in Hindu mythology as gods and heroes mentioned in the two epics—Ramayana and Mahabharata—lived here. Its subsequent history became mingled with the Puranas and other Hindu scriptures. The region saw the rise and fall of several Mahajanapadas such as the Kurus, Panchalas, Kosala and the dynasties of Kushans and Guptas. After the fall of Gupta Dynasty in the 6th century CE, this region was ruled by region powers—the Maukharies of Kannauj and Harsha of Thaneshwar. The Gurjara Pratiharas and Gahadvalas held sway over the region during 9th and 10th centuries.
