= Madra =

Ancient people in north-western South Asia

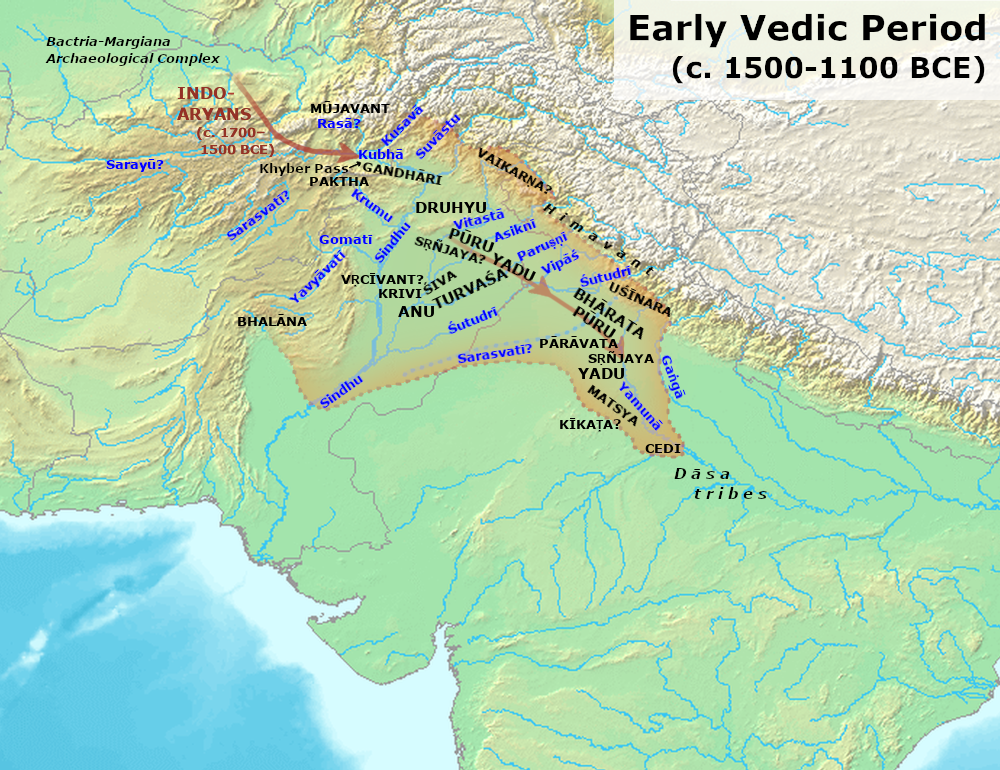
Location of the Anu tribe from which the Madras were descended among the Vedic tribes

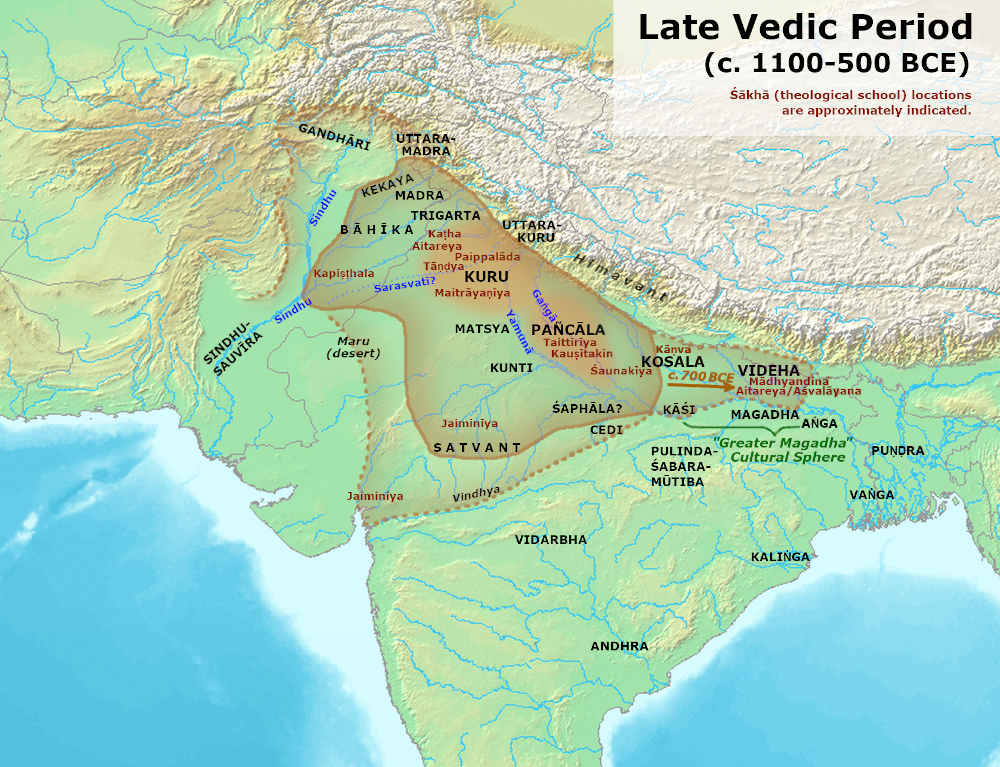
Location of the Madras during the late Vedic period

Location of the Madras during the post-Vedic period

Madra was an ancient Indo-Aryan tribe of north-western India whose existence is attested since the Iron Age (c.1100–500 BCE).

== Location ==
The Madras were divided into Uttara-Madra ("northern Madra"), Dakṣiṇa-Madra ("southern Madra"), and Madra proper:

- The Uttara Madras lived to the north of the Himavat, near the Uttara Kurus, possibly in the Kashmir Valley.
- The Madras proper lived in the Rachna Doab in the central Punjab, to the west of the Irāvatī river. These Madras were organised into a kingdom and had their capital at Sāgala or Śākala.
- The Dakṣiṇa Madras lived to the east of Śākala, possibly Amritsar and Lahore west of Beas river near the Trigartas.

== History ==
The Madras, as well as the neighbouring Kekaya and Uśīnara tribes, were descended from the Ṛgvedic Anu tribe which lived near the Paruṣṇī river in the central Punjab region, in the same area where the Madras were later located.

=== Madra proper ===
Several Vedic scholars from the Brāhmaṇa period were from Madra proper, including Śākalya, who was a member of the court of the Vaideha king Janaka, as well as Madragāra Śauṅgāyani, and Uddālaka Āruṇi's teacher Patañchala Kāpya.

During the 6th century BCE, the Madras, along with the Kekayas, Uśīnaras, and Sibis, fell under the suzerainty of the Gandhāra kingdom, which was the principal imperial power in north-west Iron Age India.

During the 5th century BCE, Kṣemā, the daughter of the Madra king, was married to the king Bimbisāra of Magadha, who himself engaged in diplomatic relations with the Madras' suzerain, the Gandhari king Pukkusāti.

== Ramayana and Mahabharata ==
The Madras appear in epic Hindu literature, especially in the Rāmāyaṇa and the Mahābhārata. In the latter, the wife of the Kuru king Pāṇḍu was a Madra princess eponymously named Mādrī, after the kingdom which she hailed from.

Another famous Madra princess mentioned in the Mahābhārata is Sāvitrī, whose father is Aśvapati, the king of Madra.
