= Shivi =

Ancient people in north-western Punjab

Shivi was an ancient Indo-Aryan tribe of north-western Ancient India whose existence is attested during the Iron Age (c.1100–500 BCE). The members of the Shivi tribe were called the Shivis.

Sivis in Punjab in 500 BCE

== Geographical locations ==
Chinese traveler Faxian records the scene of this story at So-ho-to (Swat), a country to the south of Oddiyana between the Kabol and the Indus rivers.

In some versions, Sivi appears as a personal name but in others it is the name of the country and its people. According to 7th-century Chinese monk and traveller Xuanzang, Sivika (Sibika) had cut his body to pieces to save a dove from a hawk. Xuanzang described Sivika as a personal name or an epithet. Chinese envoy Song Yun (518-20 AD) also refers to Sivika raja (Sivi king) and connects him to Oddiyana. Thus, the Chinese evidence connects king Sivi/Sivika and the Sivi people or country with the Oddiyana/Swat territory between the Kabol and Indus rivers, which forms part of modern Khyber Pakhtunkhwa province of Pakistan. Aritthapura of the Buddhist Sivi Jataka is same as the Orobatis of Alexander's historians. B. C. Law connects Jataka's Aritthapura with Ptolemy's Aristobothro in the north of Punjab.

It has been identified with Shahbazgarhi region, north of river Kabol. Dr S. B. Chaudhury also states that Aritthapura of the Sivi Jataka points to Swat valley as the ancient country of the Sivis. Matsya Purana says that Indus flowed through the Janapada of Sivapura (country of the Sivis). There is also another Buddhist legend known as Vessantara Jataka which states that king Vessantara was the son of Sañjaya (king of Sivirattha or Sivi-Rashtra) and was born in the capital city of Jatuttara. King Vessantara as a Bodhisatta had given away his magical elephant (which could bring rain on the asking) to a hostile country, and also his kingdom as well as his family with two children to a greedy Brahmana, all as acts of benevolence and generosity. Envoy Sung Yun makes reference to king Vessantara of Vessantara Jataka (as Pi-lo) while pilgrim Xuanzang refers to him (as Sudana) and both place the scene of history in the Oddiyana/Swat, north of Kabol river. But the Jatuttara of Vessantara Jataka is taken to be same as Jattaraur of Al-Biruni and is often identified with Nagri or Tambavati Nagri, 11 miles north of Chittore in Rajputana. In this connection, N. L. Dey has observed that there were two countries called Sivi---one located in Swat (Oddiyana) with its capital at Aritthapura and the second is the same as the Sivika of Varahamihira which he places among the countries of the south-west with its capital at Jatuttara in Madhyamika (south-west Rajputana). It has also been suggested that Sivi was originally a geographical name from which the name of its ruler and that of its people may have been derived.

While referring to a certain Sakya legend connected with 'Oddiyana locale' (Khyber Pakhtunkhwa province of Pakistan), James Fergusson connects the Oddiyana country with the Kamboja of the Hindu texts. Indeed, the territories of Kunar, Oddiyana, Swat and Varanaos had been the notable habitats of the Asvaka Kambojas since remote antiquity. The Asvakas were cattle breeders and horse folk and had earned the epithet of Asvakas due to their intimate connections with the Asvas ("horses"). The Sivis, as described by Alexander's historians, "were a shaved-headed people, worshipers of god Shiva, wore clothes made from animal skins, and were warlike people who fought with the clubs...most of these are also the salient characteristics of the ancient Kambojas".

It appears likely that the Sivis originally lived in north of river Kabol in remote antiquity, from where sections of them moved southwards in later times and settled in what is called Seva around Bolan Pass, which region was known as Sivistan till recently. Pāṇini also mentions a place called Sivapura which he includes in the Udichya (northern) division of Ancient India and which is identified by some scholars with Sibipura of the Shorkot Inscriptions edited by Vogel. The southerly movement of the Sivis is also evidenced from their other settlement called Usinara near Yamuna, ruled by Sivi king called Usinara. Sivis also are attested to have one settlement in Sind, another one in Madhyamika (Tambavati Nagri) near Chittore (in Rajputana) and yet another one on the Dasa Kumara-chrita on the banks of the Kaveri in southern India (Karnataka/Tamil Nadu). It is mentioned in the epic that Jayadratha was the king of Sindhu, Sauvira and Sivi kingdoms. Sauvira and Sivi were two kingdom close to the Sindhu kingdom and Jayadratha conquered them, which would place Sivi somewhere in Balochistan which is to the west of Sauvira and Sindhu and adjacent to both. Some writers think that Sivi may have been originally located at the foot of Bolan Pass from there they might have extended their influence to Oddiyana/Swat but this is unlikely.
