= Kekaya =

Ancient people in north-western Punjab

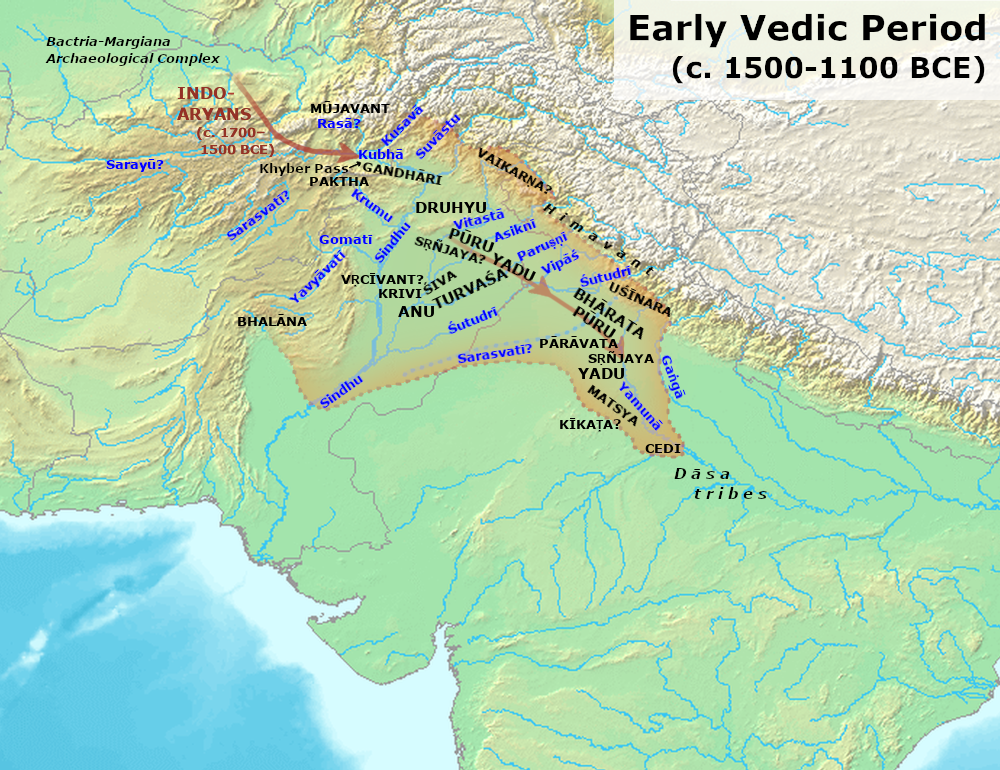
Location of the Anu tribe from which the Kekayas were descended among the Vedic tribes

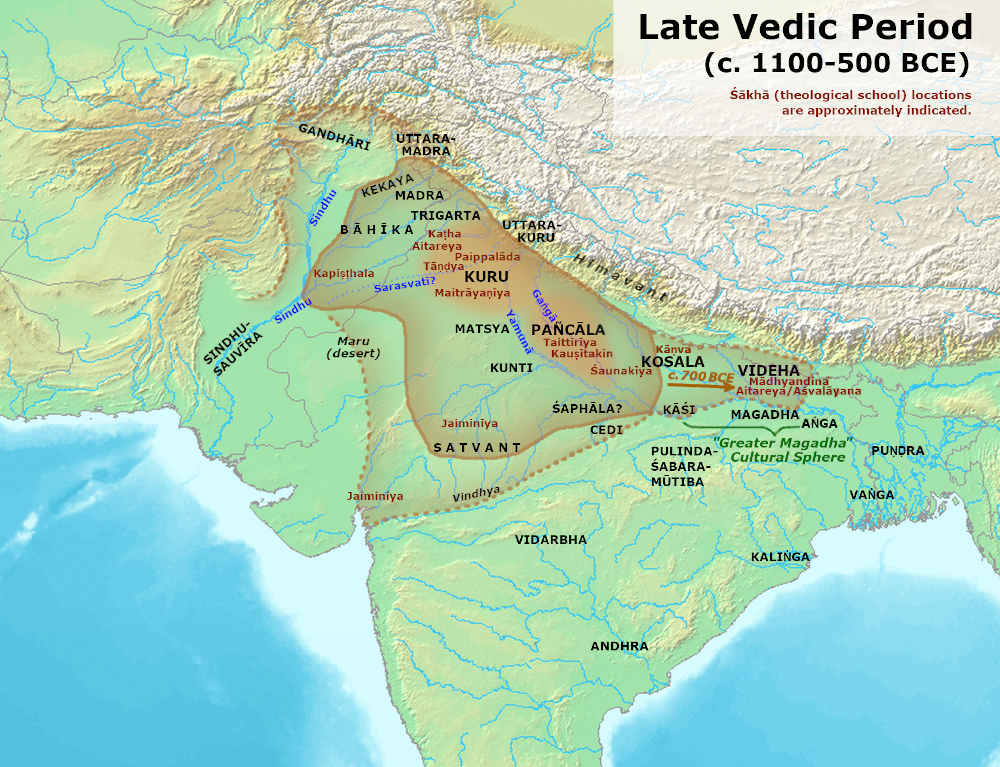
Location of the Kekayas during the late Vedic period

Location of the Kekayas during the post-Vedic period

Kekaya (Sanskrit: Kekaya) was an ancient Indo-Aryan tribe of north-western South Asia whose existence is attested during the Iron Age (c.1100–500 BCE).

== Location ==
The Kekayas were located between the Gāndhāra kingdom and the Vipāśā river, more precisely on a tributary of the Irāvatī river named the Saranges by ancient Greek authors.

The capital of Kekaya was a city named Rājagṛha or Girivraja, identified with the modern-day Girjak or Jalalpur in the Pakistani Punjab.

== History ==
The Kekeyas, as well as the neighbouring Madra and Uśīnara tribes, were descended from the Ṛgvedic Anu tribe which lived near the Paruṣṇī river in the central Punjab region, in the same area where the Kekayas were later located.

A famous king of Kekaya during the late Vedic period was Aśvapati, who is mentioned in the Śatapatha Brāhmaṇa and the Chāndogya Upaniṣad as a patron of brāhmaṇas, and was an elder contemporary of the king Janaka of Videha.

During the 6th century BCE, the Kekayas, along with the Madras, Uśīnaras, and Sibis, fell under the suzerainty of the Gāndhāra kingdom, which was the principal imperial power in north-west Iron Age South Asia.

=== Later history ===
The 10th century CE Kāvyamīmāṃsā of Rājaśekhara furnishes a list of the extant tribes of his times which also includes the Kekayas along with the Shakas, Tusharas, Vokanas, Hunas, Kambojas, Vahlikas, Vahlavas, Limpakas, Tangana, Turukshas, referring to them all as the tribes of Uttarapatha or north division.

A branch of the Kekaya seems to have migrated to southern India in later times and established its authority in Mysore country.

== In epic literature ==
The Kekayas appear in epic Hindu literature, especially in the Rāmāyaṇa and the Mahābhārata. In the former, the step-mother of the god Rāma and mother of the prince Bharata is the eponymous princess of Kekaya, Kaikeyī.
