= Ancient maritime history =

Maritime history dates back thousands of years. The earliest watercraft used by humans were rafts, as they needed less sophisticated wood-working skills to make. The oldest archaeological survival of a prehistoric boat is a dugout canoe, the Pesse canoe, which dates to approximately 10,000 years ago. Dugouts probably coexisted with hide-covered boats, which are much less likely to survive for archaeological investigation. Some evidence suggests that archaic hominins may have crossed the sea as early as 700,000 to one million years ago.

In ancient maritime history, evidence of maritime trade between civilizations dates back at least five millennia. Egyptians had trade routes through the Red Sea, importing spices from the "Land of Punt" and from Arabia, and the Sumerians traded with the Indus Valley civilization around the same time. By the time of Julius Caesar of the Roman Empire, several well-established combined land-sea trade routes depended upon water transport through the sea around the rough inland terrain features to its north. The search for the source of spices in these maritime trade routes later led to the Age of Discovery.

== Maritime prehistory ==
=== General principles ===
The earliest seafaring is presumed to have developed in the "nursery" areas of Island Southeast Asia (ISEA) and the Mediterranean. Both ISEA and the Mediterranean had a warm climate and, particularly in the former, large numbers of intervisible islands; both assisted early seafarers. Water transport also developed on major rivers, such as the Nile.

The first watercraft are likely to have been rafts, as these make fewer demands on the woodworking skills of pre-neolithic builders. Rafts or hide-covered boats (e.g. coracle) have a low probability of surviving in an archaeological site; there are historical instances of rafts being dismantled after use and the components being used for other purposes, further reducing the chances of archaeological survival. Therefore, maritime transport has to be inferred from evidence such as human migration which cannot have been carried out by land, even in cases of lowered sea levels due to extensive glaciation. Other presumed evidence of water transport has proved problematic. Excavated bones of pelagic fish species (such as tuna) have been erroneously interpreted as demonstrating deep-sea fishing. Prior to fish stocks being reduced by commercial fishing, these species have been readily caught where deep water exists close to the shoreline.

The invention (or adoption) of the sail is believed to have happened quite late in the prehistory of maritime transport, coinciding with other changes in the process of neolithicisation. Iconographic evidence of sail in Egypt dates to the late fourth millennium BC, and there is suggestive evidence in the eastern Mediterranean and the Persian Gulf in the late third millennium BC. These advances in water transport are broadly contemporaneous with wheeled transport pulled by draught animals (examples c. 3000-2000 BC). The invention of new forms of transport technology, both at sea and on land, have posed questions about relationships between the processes that have come into play with each development.

Whilst the invention of the sail may appear obvious to a modern seafarer, its introduction and then spread into other regions (or the independent invention in those regions) happened slowly. From the eastern Mediterranean and Red Sea/Persian Gulf c. 2500 BC, expansion into the central Mediterranean and the west coast of India happened c. 2000 BC. Eastward spread into the Bay of Bengal and Island Southeast Asia has been dated to c. 1000 BC, with spread into the western Mediterranean at about the same time. Northern Europe, excluding Nordic countries, has evidence of sail use from the early years AD, whilst Scandinavia appears not to have used sails until late in the first millennium AD. Sailing was not used in the Caribbean until the arrival of Columbus' ships in 1492.

Whether the sail was invented on different occasions in different places is difficult to assess, with diffusionist theories falling in and out of fashion. One instance of independent invention may be in the region of the Guayaquil river in modern Ecuador. Sails of a relatively unique design were being used when Europeans first arrived in the area in the 16th century. The geography of the Guayaquil river is reminiscent of that of the Nile, with the prevailing wind going in the opposite direction to the flow of the river. This allows drifting downstream and sailing upstream: a suitable situation to encourage invention of sailing.

=== Island Southeast Asia into greater Australia ===
The lowered sea levels of the Pleistocene made some of the modern-day islands of Sundaland accessible via land bridges. However, the spread of anatomically modern humans across the Wallace line and into Sahul necessitated crossing bodies of water. Remains of stone tools and marine shells in Liang Sarru, Salibabu Island, North Sulawesi, dated to 32,000–35,000 years ago, is possible evidence for the longest sea voyage by Paleolithic humans ever recorded. The island was previously uninhabited by humans or hominins and can only be reached from either Mindanao or the Sangihe Islands by crossing an expanse of water at least 100 km (62 mi) wide, even during the low sea levels of the Pleistocene. Other evidence of early maritime transport are the appearance of obsidian tools with the same source on neighboring islands. These include the Philippine obsidian network (Mindoro and Palawan, c. 33,000-28,000 BP), and the Wallacea obsidian network (Timor, Atauro, Kisar, Alor, c. 22,000 BP). However, the method of crossing remains unknown and could have ranged from simple rafts to dugout canoes by the terminal Pleistocene.

The sea crossing by humans to the Sahul landmass (modern Australia and New Guinea) from the Sundaland peninsula occurred around 53,000 to 65,000 years ago. Even with the lower sea level of that time, this crossing would have involved travelling out of sight of land – the overall distances involved at the possible crossing points are all over 55 miles. It is likely that large bamboo rafts were used, possibly with a sail of some sort. Up until 58,000 BP, the winds during the Northern Australian wet season were particularly favourable for making this crossing (relevant even without sails). The reduction in favourable winds after that date fits well with the single colonisation phase of Australia during prehistory.

In the history of whaling, humans are believed to have begun whaling in Korea at least 6000 BC. The oldest known method of catching whales is to simply drive them ashore by placing a number of small boats between the whale and the open sea and attempting to frighten them with noise, activity, and perhaps small, non-lethal weapons such as arrows.

== Austronesian expansion ==
Map showing the migration and expansion of the Austronesians which began at about 3000 BC from Taiwan

Austronesians used distinctive sailing technologies, namely the catamaran, the outrigger ship, tanja sail and the crab claw sail. This allowed them to colonize a large part of the Indo-Pacific region during the Austronesian expansion starting at around 3000 to 1500 BC, and ending with the colonization of Easter Island and New Zealand in the 10th to 13th centuries AD. Prior to the 16th century Colonial Era, Austronesians were the most widespread ethnolinguistic group, spanning half the planet from Easter Island in the eastern Pacific Ocean to Madagascar in the western Indian Ocean. They also established vast maritime trading networks, among which is the Neolithic precursor to what would become the Maritime Silk Road.

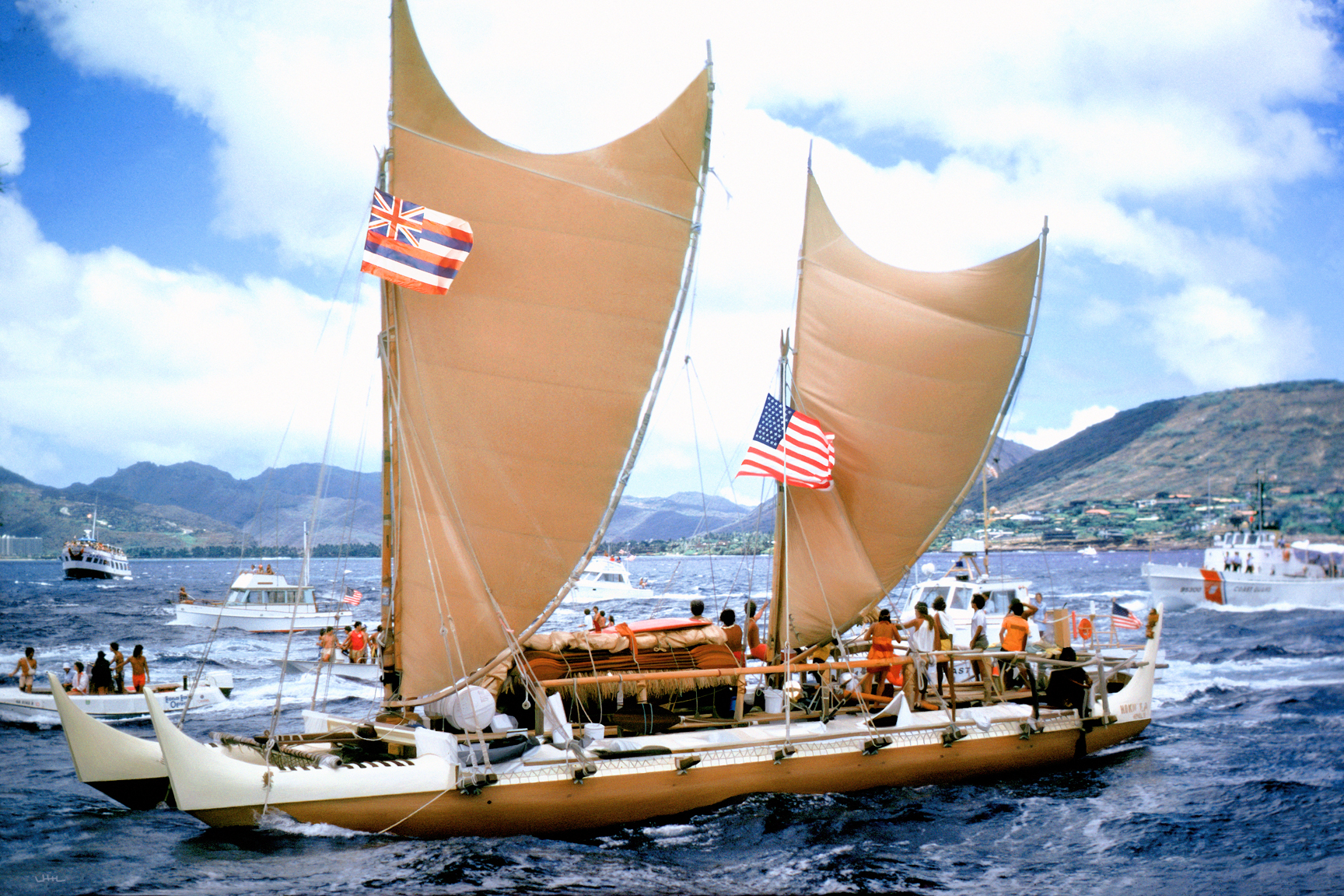
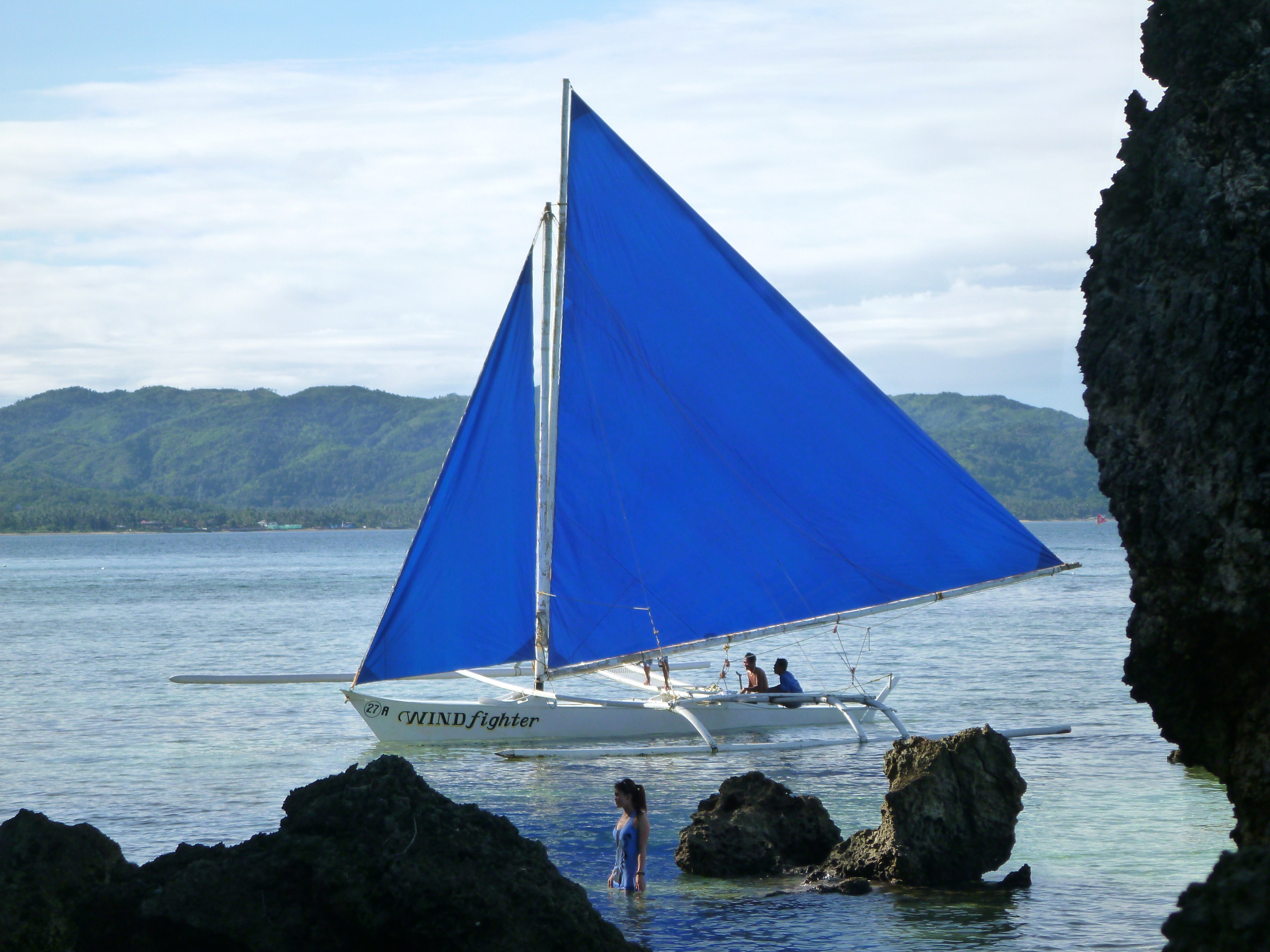
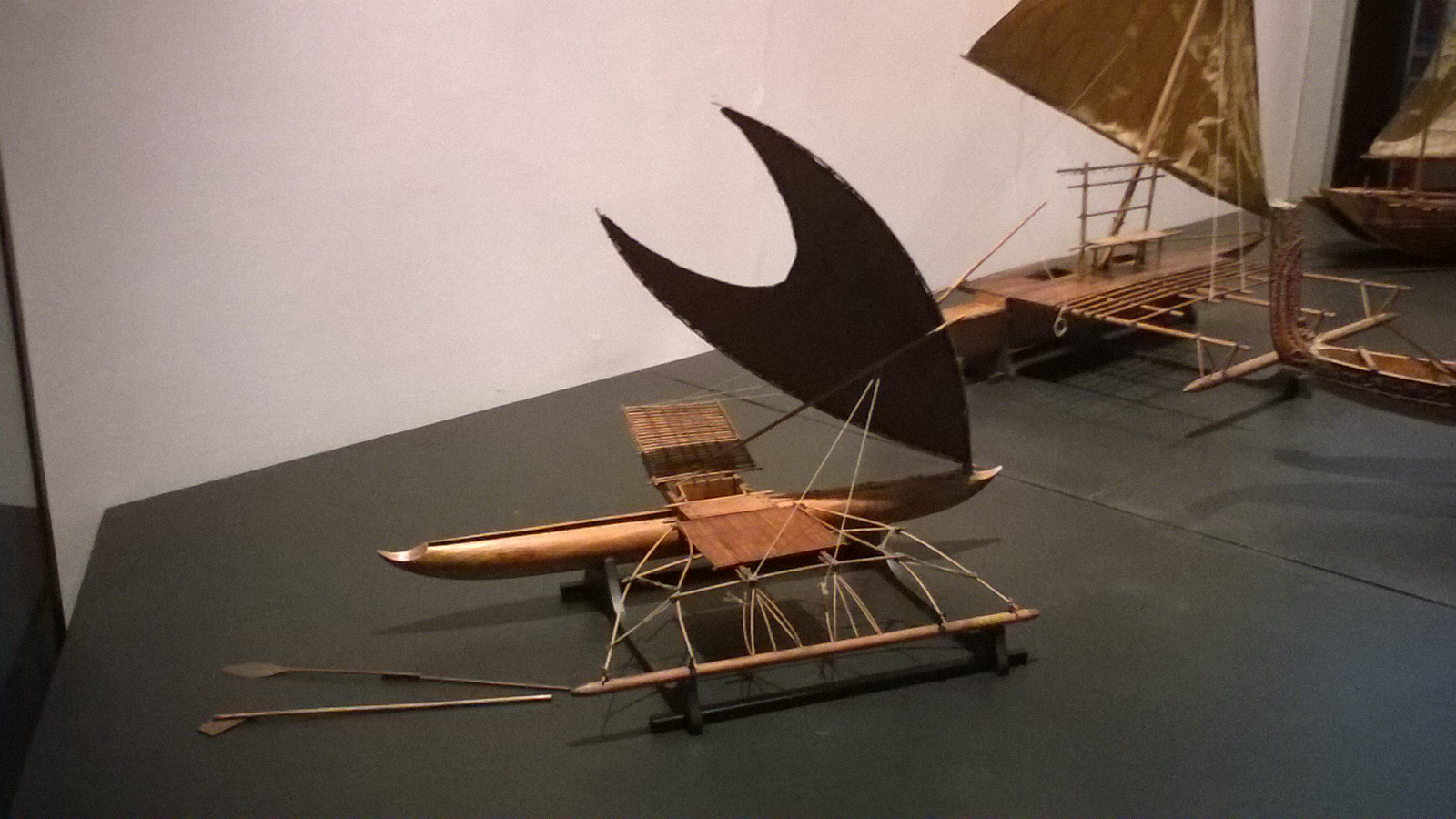
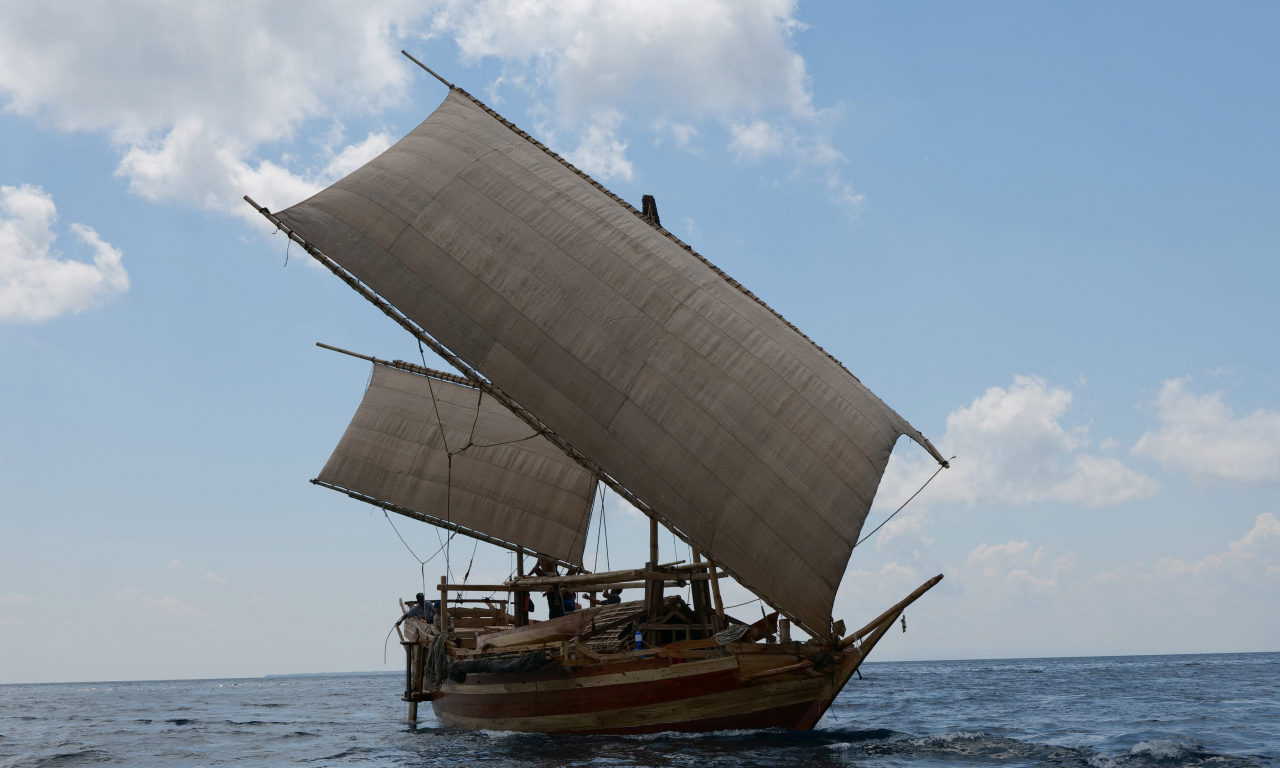
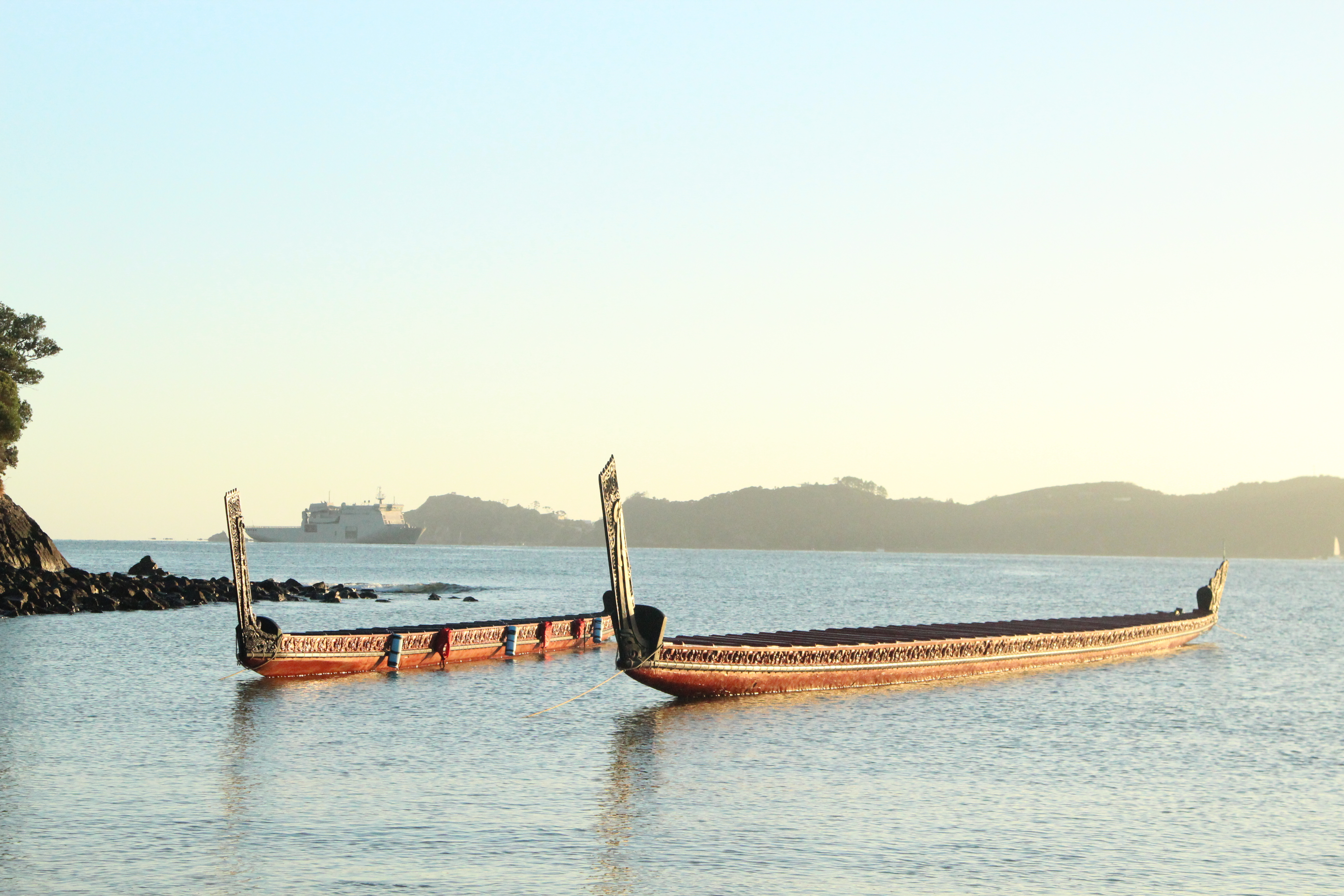
Typical Austronesian ship designs, left to right:
- Hōkūleʻa, a replica Polynesian voyaging catamaran with crab claw sails
- Filipino double-outrigger (trimaran) paraw with a crab claw sail
- A Melanesian single-outrigger tepukei with a forward-mounted crab claw sail from the Solomon Islands
- Nur al Marege, an Indonesian replica of a padewakang with tanja sails
- Waka, narrow Māori war canoes propelled by paddling

The acquisition of the catamaran and outrigger boat technology by the non-Austronesian peoples in Sri Lanka and southern India is the result of Austronesian contact with the region, including the Maldives and Laccadive Islands. This is estimated to have occurred around 1000 to 600 BC and onwards, and led to the development of India and Sri Lanka's own maritime trade networks. This may have possibly included limited colonization that have since been assimilated. This is still evident in Sri Lankan and South Indian languages. For example, Tamil paṭavu, Telugu paḍava, and Kannada paḍahu, all meaning "ship", are all derived from Proto-Hesperonesian *padaw, "sailboat", with Austronesian cognates like Javanese perahu, Kadazan padau, Maranao padaw, Cebuano paráw, Samoan folau, Hawaiian halau, and Māori wharau.

Similarly the first encounter with large sea-going ships by the Chinese is through trade with Southeast Asian Austronesian ships (likely Javanese or Sumatran) during the Han dynasty (220 BC–200 AD) as recorded by the Chinese historian Wan Chen (萬震) in his 3rd century AD book "Strange Things of the South" (Nánzhōu Yìwùzhì – 南州異物志). This led to the development of China's own maritime technologies later on, during the Song dynasty in the 10th to 13th century AD.

At the furthest extents of the Austronesian expansion, colonists from Borneo crossed the Indian Ocean westward to settle in Madagascar and the Comoros by around 500 AD.

In the east, the first true ocean voyage was the colonization of the Northern Marianas Islands of Micronesia from the Philippines. This was followed by more migrations southwards and eastwards to Island Melanesia up to islands beyond the inter-island visibility range like Tonga and Samoa. This region was occupied by the Austronesian Lapita culture. After a gap of about two thousand years, the first Polynesians continued spreading eastwards into the Cook Islands, French Polynesia, Hawaii, Easter Island, and Aotearoa, New Zealand by around AD 700 to 1200.

Austronesian seafarers used environmental navigation systems: orientation at sea is carried out using a variety of different natural signs, and by using an astronomy technique called "star path navigation". Basically, the navigators determined the course of the ship to the destination by recognising the rising and setting positions of certain stars on the horizon.

Māori people of New Zealand are said to have navigated following the zodiacal constellation of Scorpio, between Libra and Sagittarius in the southern sky positioned at about 16 hours 30 minutes right ascension and 30° south declination to find, Aotearoa, "The Land of the Long, White, Cloud".

== Ancient routes and locations ==
Ancient maritime routes usually began in the Far East or down river from Madhya Pradesh with transshipment via historic Bharuch (Bharakuccha), traversed past the inhospitable coast of today's Iran then split around Hadhramaut into two streams north into the Gulf of Aden and thence into the Levant, or south into Alexandria via Red Sea ports such as Axum. Each major route involved transhipping to pack animal caravan, travel through desert country and risk of bandits and extortionate tolls by local potentiates.

Names, routes and locations of the Periplus of the Erythraean Sea at the turn of the first millennium.

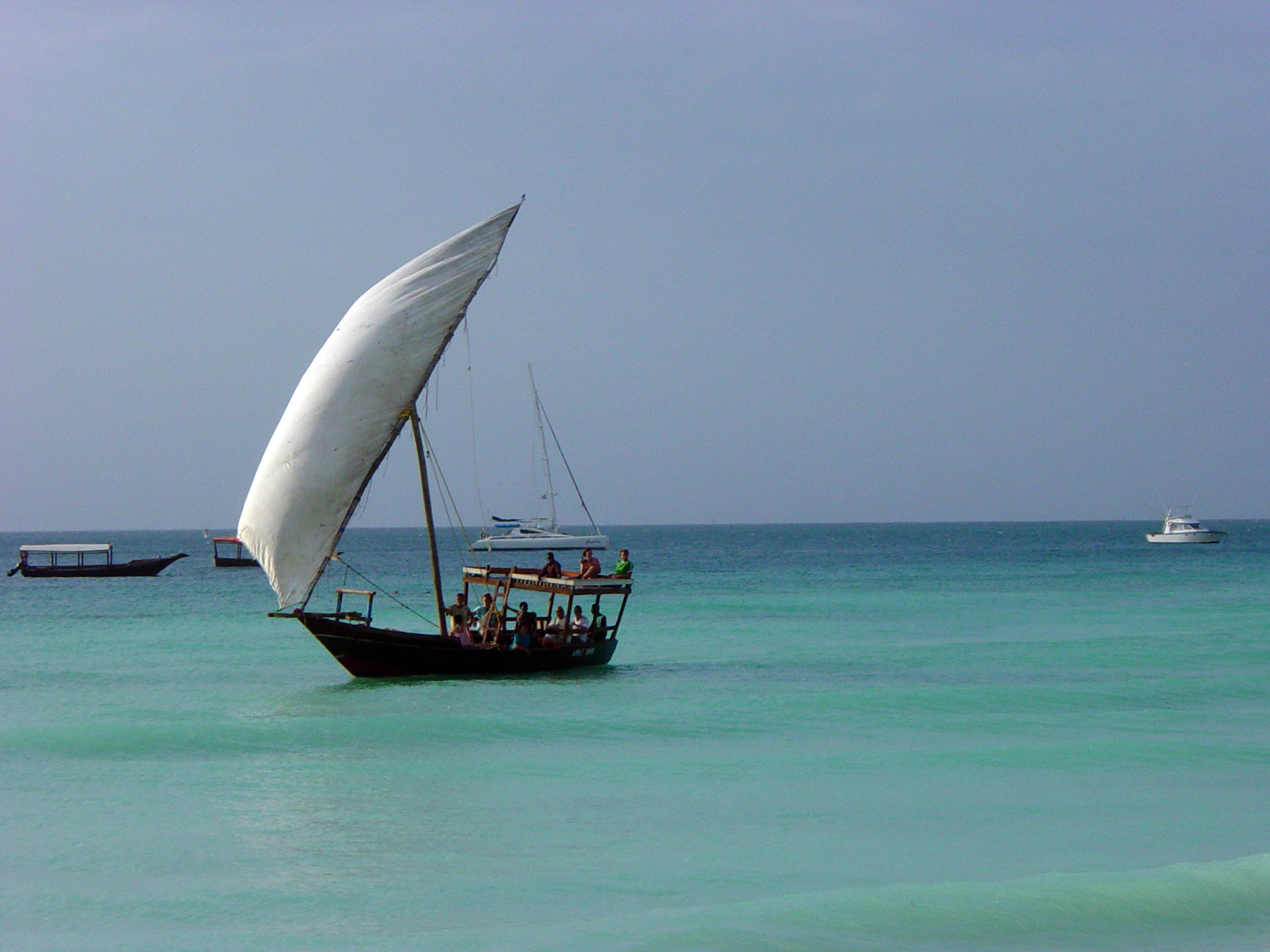
Much of the Radhanites' Indian Ocean trade would have depended on coastal cargo-ships such as this dhow.

Maritime trade began with safer coastal trade and evolved with the utilization of the monsoon winds, soon resulting in trade crossing boundaries such as the Arabian Sea and the Bay of Bengal. South Asia had multiple maritime trade routes which connected it to Southeast Asia, thereby making the control of one route resulting in maritime monopoly difficult. Indian traders had a choice of routes to Southeast Asian states, so protecting them from one power controlling trade that went through their territory. By making use of the maritime trade routes, bulk commodity trade became possible for the Romans in the 2nd century BC. A Roman trading vessel could span the Mediterranean in a month at one-sixtieth the cost of over-land routes.

=== Egypt ===
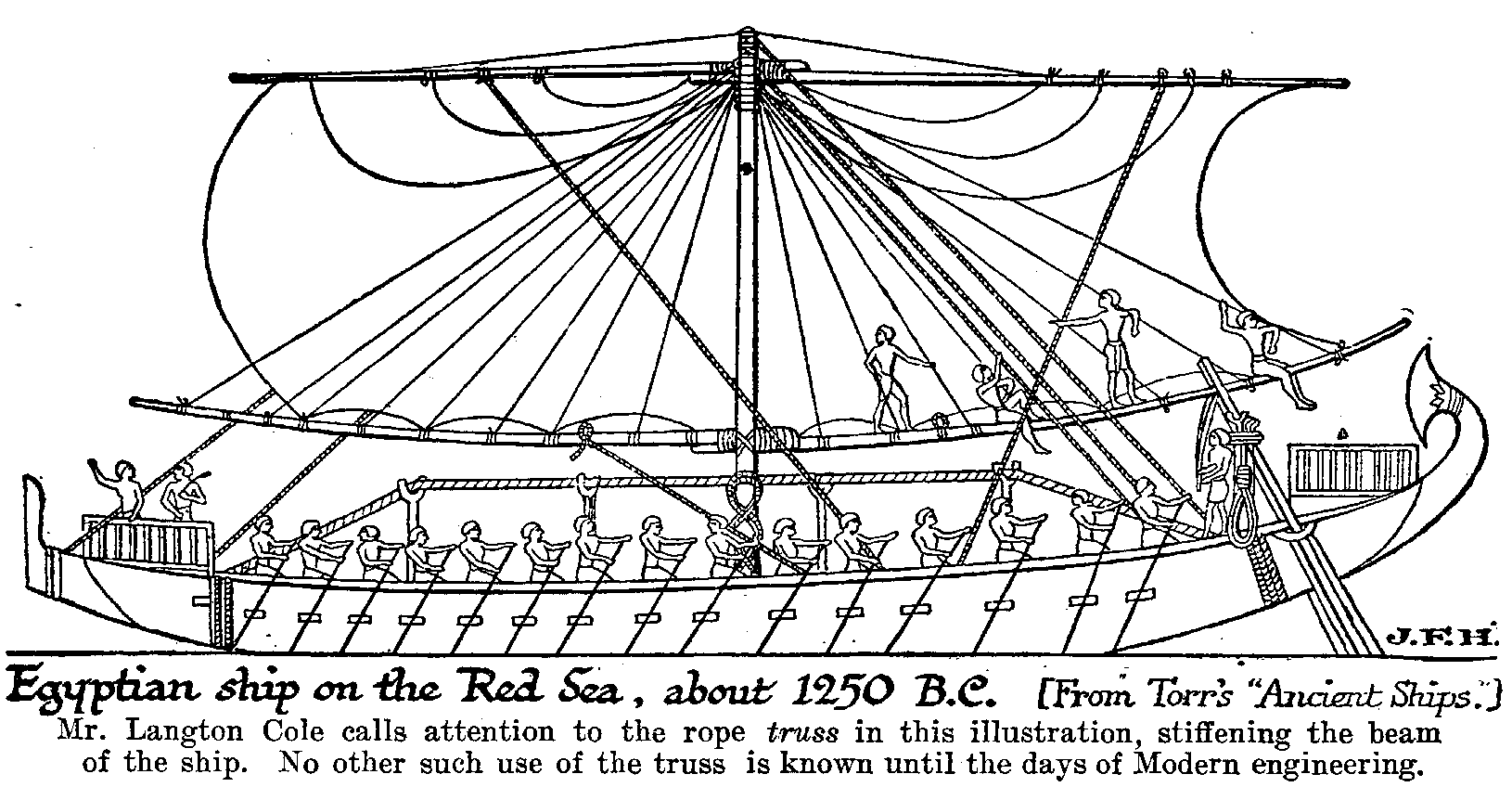
Egyptian ship, 1250 BC

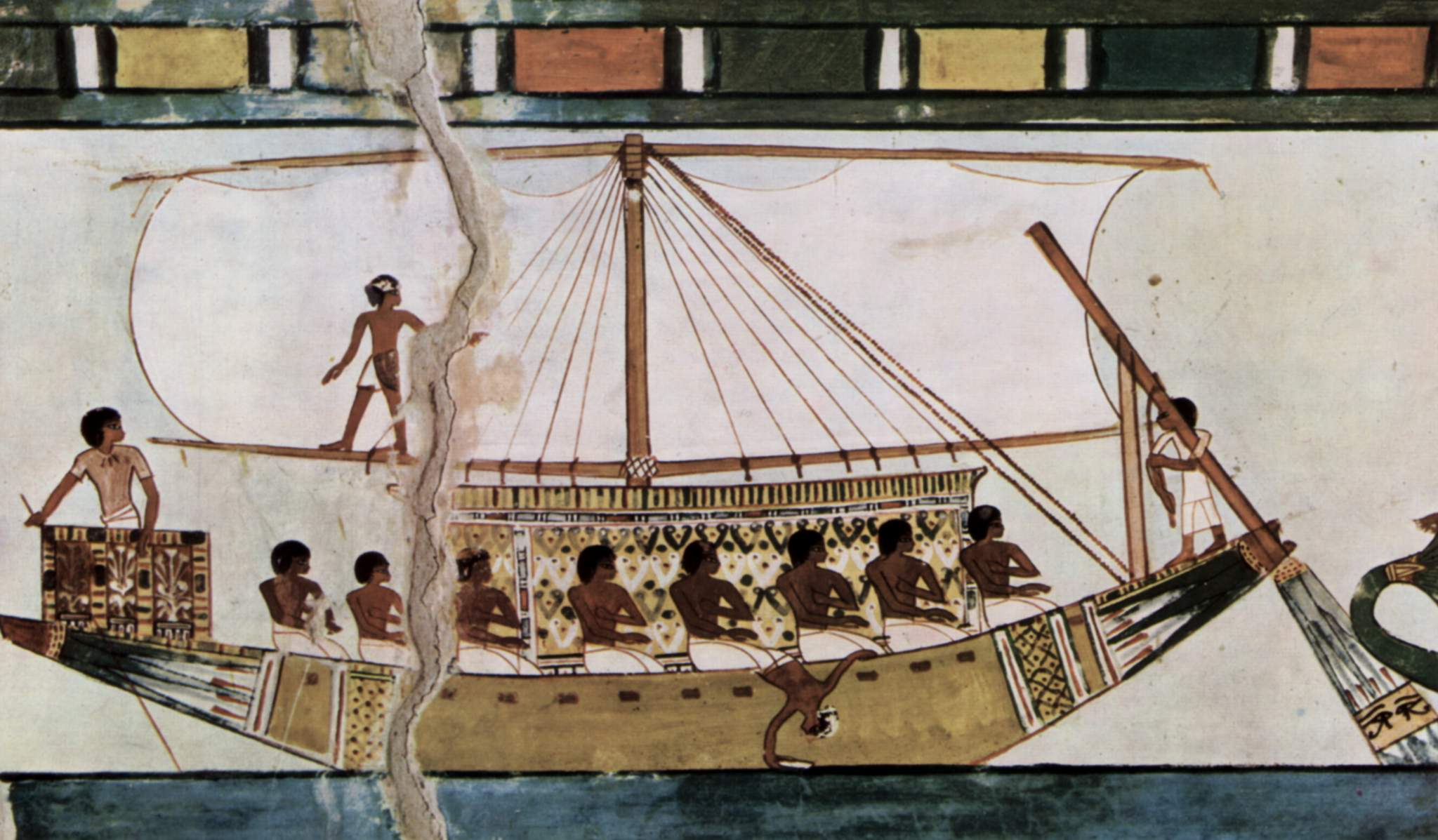
World's oldest depiction of a stern-mounted steering rudder (c. 1420 BC)

The Ancient Egyptians had knowledge of sail construction.

The first warships of Ancient Egypt were constructed during the early Middle Kingdom, and perhaps – at the end of the Old Kingdom, but the first mention and a detailed description of a large enough and heavily armed ship dates from 16th century BC. "And I ordered to build twelve warships with rams, dedicated to Amun or Sobek, or Maat and Sekhmet, whose image was crowned best bronze noses. Carport and equipped outside rook over the waters, for many paddlers, having covered rowers deck not only from the side, but and top. and they were on board eighteen oars in two rows on the top and sat on two rowers, and the lower – one, a hundred and eight rowers were. And twelve rowers aft worked on three steering oars. And blocked Our Majesty ship inside three partitions (bulkheads) so as not to drown it by ramming the wicked, and the sailors had time to repair the hole. And Our Majesty arranged four towers for archers – two behind, and two on the nose and one above the other small – on the mast with narrow loopholes. they are covered with bronze in the fifth finger (3.2mm), as well as a canopy roof and its rowers. and they have (carried) on the nose three assault heavy crossbow arrows so they lit resin or oil with a salt of Seth (probably nitrate) tore a special blend and punched (?) lead ball with a lot of holes (?), and one of the same at the stern. and long ship seventy five cubits (41m), and the breadth sixteen, and in battle can go three-quarters of iteru per hour (about 6.5 knots)..." The text of the tomb of Amenhotep I (KV39). When Thutmose III achieved warships displacement up to 360 tons and carried up to ten new heavy and light to seventeen catapults based bronze springs, called "siege crossbow" – more precisely, siege bows. Still appeared giant catamarans that are heavy warships and times of Ramesses III used even when the Ptolemaic dynasty.

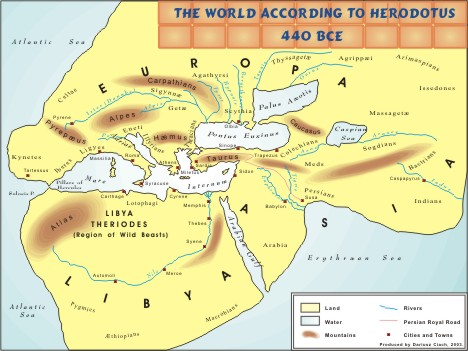
The world according to Herodotus, 440 BC

According to the Greek historian Herodotus, Necho II sent out an expedition of Phoenicians, which reputedly, at some point between 610 and before 594 BC, sailed in three years from the Red Sea around Africa to the mouth of the Nile. Some Egyptologists dispute that an Egyptian Pharaoh would authorize such an expedition, except for the reason of trade in the ancient maritime routes.

The belief in Herodotus' account, handed down to him by oral tradition, is primarily because he stated with disbelief that the Phoenicians "as they sailed on a westerly course round the southern end of Libya (Africa), they had the sun on their right – to northward of them" (The Histories 4.42) – in Herodotus' time it was not generally known that Africa was surrounded by an ocean (with the southern part of Africa being thought connected to Asia). So fantastic an assertion is this of a typical example of some seafarers' story and Herodotus therefore may never have mentioned it, at all, had it not been based on facts and made with the according insistence.

This early description of Necho's expedition as a whole is contentious, though; it is recommended that one keep an open mind on the subject; but Strabo, Polybius, and Ptolemy doubted the description. Egyptologist A. B. Lloyd suggests that the Greeks at this time understood that anyone going south far enough and then turning west would have the Sun on their right but found it unbelievable that Africa reached so far south. He suggests that "It is extremely unlikely that an Egyptian king would, or could, have acted as Necho is depicted as doing" and that the story might have been triggered by the failure of Sataspes' attempt to circumnavigate Africa under Xerxes the Great. Regardless, it was believed by Herodotus and Pliny.

Much earlier, the Sea Peoples was a confederacy of seafaring raiders who sailed into the eastern shores of the Mediterranean, caused political unrest, and attempted to enter or control Egyptian territory during the late 19th dynasty, and especially during Year 8 of Ramesses III of the 20th Dynasty. The Egyptian Pharaoh Merneptah explicitly refers to them by the term "the foreign-countries (or 'peoples') of the sea" in his Great Karnak Inscription. Although some scholars believe that they "invaded" Cyprus and the Levant, this hypothesis is disputed.

==== Kingdom of Punt ====
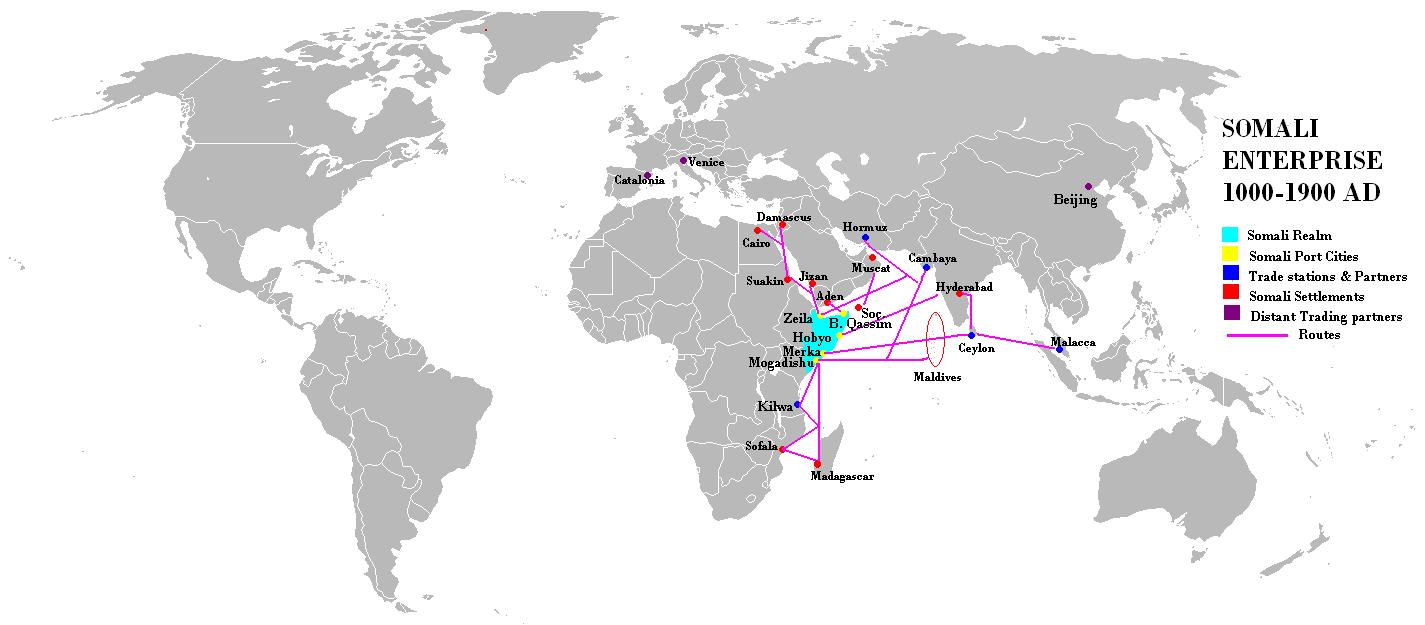
Historical Somali commercial enterprise in the Red Sea, the Persian Gulf, the Indian Ocean, and the straits of Malacca.

In ancient times the Kingdom of Punt, which is believed by several Egyptologists to have been situated in the area of modern-day Somalia, had a steady trade link with the Ancient Egyptians and exported the precious natural resources such as myrrh, frankincense and gum. This trade network continued all the way into the classical era. The city states of Mossylon, Opone, Malao, Mundus and Tabae in Somalia engaged in a lucrative trade network connecting Somali merchants with Phoenicia, Ptolemic Egypt, Greece, Parthian Persia, Saba, Nabataea and the Roman Empire. Somali sailors used the ancient Somali maritime vessel known as the beden to transport their cargo.

=== The Mediterranean ===
Minoan traders from Crete were active in the eastern Mediterranean by the 2nd millennium BC. The Phoenicians were an ancient civilization centered in the north of ancient Canaan, with its heartland along the coast of modern-day Lebanon, Western Syria and northern Israel. Phoenician civilization was an enterprising maritime trading culture that spread across the Mediterranean during the first millennium BC, between the period of 1200 BC to 900 BC. The recent discovery of three shipwrecks off the coast of Israel provides new insights into the history of maritime trade during the Iron Age. Though ancient boundaries of such city-centered cultures fluctuated, the city of Tyre seems to have been the southernmost. Sarepta between Sidon and Tyre, is the most thoroughly excavated city of the Phoenician homeland. The Phoenicians often traded by means of a galley, a man-powered sailing vessel. They were the first civilization to create the bireme. There is still debate on the subject of whether the Canaanites and Phoenicians were different peoples or not.

The Mediterranean was the source of the vessel, galley, developed before 1000 BC, and development of nautical technology supported the expansion of Mediterranean culture. The Greek trireme was the most common ship of the ancient Mediterranean world, employing the propulsion power of oarsmen. Mediterranean peoples developed lighthouse technology and built large fire-based lighthouses, most notably the Lighthouse of Alexandria, built in the 3rd century BC (between 285 and 247 BC) on the island of Pharos in Alexandria, Egypt.

Many in ancient western societies, such as Ancient Greece, were in awe of the seas and deified them, believing that man no longer belonged to himself when once he embarked on a sea voyage. They believed that he was liable to be sacrificed at any time to the anger of the great Sea God. Before the Greeks, the Carians were an early Mediterranean seagoing people that travelled far. Early writers do not give a good idea about the progress of navigation nor that of the man's seamanship. One of the early stories of seafaring was that of Odysseus.

In Greek mythology, the Argonauts were a band of heroes who, in the years before the Trojan War, accompanied Jason to Colchis in his quest to find the Golden Fleece. Their name comes from their ship, the Argo which in turn was named after its builder Argus. Thus, "Argonauts" literally means "Argo sailors". The voyage of the Greek navigator Pytheas of Massalia is an example of a very early voyage. A competent astronomer and geographer, Pytheas ventured from Greece to Western Europe and the British Isles.

The periplus, literally "a sailing-around', in the ancient navigation of Phoenicians, Greeks, and Romans was a manuscript document that listed in order the ports and coastal landmarks, with approximate distances between, that the captain of a vessel could expect to find along a shore. Several examples of periploi have survived.

Piracy, which is a robbery committed at sea or sometimes on the shore, dates back to Classical Antiquity and, in all likelihood, much further. The Tyrrhenians, Illyrians and Thracians were known as pirates in ancient times. The island of Lemnos long resisted Greek influence and remained a haven for Thracian pirates. By the 1st century BC, there were pirate states along the Anatolian coast, threatening the commerce of the Roman Empire.

The earliest seagoing culture in the Mediterranean is associated with Cardium pottery. Their earliest impressed ware sites, dating to 6400–6200 BC, are in Epirus and Corfu. Settlements then appear in Albania and Dalmatia on the eastern Adriatic coast dating to between 6100 and 5900 BC. The earliest date in Italy comes from Coppa Nevigata on the Adriatic coast of southern Italy, perhaps as early as 6000 cal B.C. Also during Su Carroppu culture in Sardinia, already in its early stages (low strata into Su Coloru cave, c. 6000 BC) early examples of cardium pottery appear. Northward and westward all secure radiocarbon dates are identical to those for Iberia c. 5500 cal BC, which indicates a rapid spread of cardium and related cultures: 2,000 km from the gulf of Genoa to the estuary of the Mondego in probably no more than 100–200 years. This suggests a seafaring expansion by planting colonies along the coast.

==== The Persian Wars ====
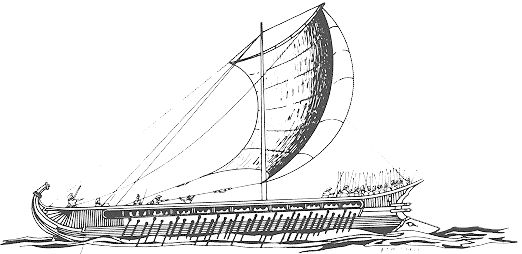
Greek Trireme

In Ionia (the modern Aegean coast of Turkey) the Greek cities, which included great centres such as Miletus and Halicarnassus, were unable to maintain their independence and came under the rule of the Persian Empire in the mid-6th century BC. In 499 BC the Greeks rose in the Ionian Revolt, and Athens and some other Greek cities went to their aid. In 490 BC, the Persian Great King, Darius I, having suppressed the Ionian cities, sent a fleet to punish the Greeks. The Persians landed in Attica, but were defeated at the Battle of Marathon by a Greek army led by the Athenian general Miltiades. The burial mound of the Athenian dead can still be seen at Marathon. Ten years later Darius' successor, Xerxes I, sent a much more powerful force by land. After being delayed by the Spartan King Leonidas I at Thermopylae, Xerxes advanced into Attica, where he captured and burned Athens. But the Athenians had evacuated the city by sea, and under Themistocles they defeated the Persian fleet at the Battle of Salamis. A year later, the Greeks, under the Spartan Pausanias, defeated the Persian army at Plataea. The Athenian fleet then turned to chasing the Persians out of the Aegean Sea, and in 478 BC they captured Byzantium. In the course of doing so Athens enrolled all the island states and some mainland allies into an alliance, called the Delian League because its treasury was kept on the sacred island of Delos. The Spartans, although they had taken part in the war, withdrew into isolation after it, allowing Athens to establish unchallenged naval and commercial power.

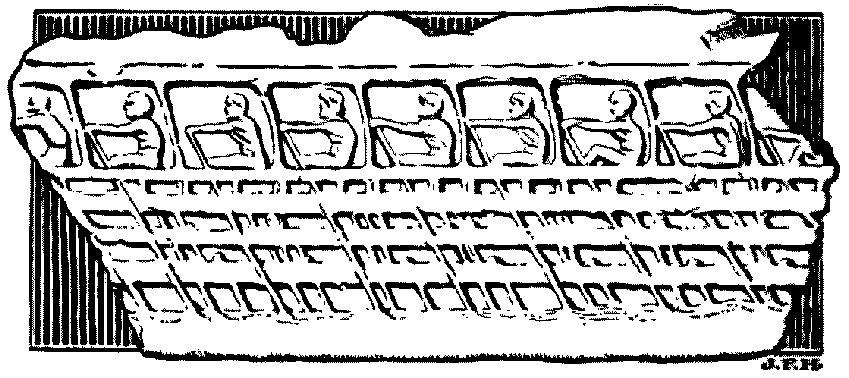
Athenian warship (Trireme), c. 400 BC

==== Punic Wars ====
The Punic Wars were a series of three wars fought between Rome and Carthage. The main cause of the Punic Wars was the clash of interests between the existing Carthaginian Empire and the expanding Roman sphere of influence. The Romans were initially interested in expansion via Sicily, part of which lay under Carthaginian control. At the start of the first Punic War, Carthage was the dominant power of the Mediterranean, with an extensive maritime empire, while Rome was the rapidly ascending power in Italy. By the end of the third war, after the deaths of many hundreds of thousands of soldiers from both sides, Rome had conquered Carthage's empire and razed the city, becoming in the process the most powerful state of the Western Mediterranean. With the end of the Macedonian wars – which ran concurrently with the Punic Wars – and the defeat of the Seleucid Emperor Antiochus III the Great in the Roman-Syrian War (Treaty of Apamea, 188 BC) in the eastern sea, Rome emerged as the dominant Mediterranean power and the most powerful city in the classical world. This was a turning point that meant that the civilization of the ancient Mediterranean would pass to the modern world via Europe instead of Africa.

=== Pre-Roman Britain ===
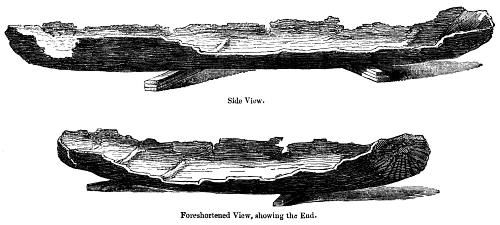
Ancient British canoe

The Coracle, a small single-passenger-sized float, has been used in Britain since before the first Roman invasion as noted by the invaders. Coracles are round or oval in shape, made of a wooden frame with a hide stretched over it then tarred to provide waterproofing. Being so light, an operator can carry the light craft over the shoulder. They are capable of operating in mere inches of water due to the keel-less hull. The early people of Wales used these boats for fishing and light travel and updated models are still in use to this day on the rivers of Scotland and Wales.

Early Britons also used the dugout canoe. Examples of these canoes have been found buried in marshes and mud banks of rivers at lengths of upward eight feet.

In 1992 a notable archaeological find, named the "Dover Bronze Age Boat", was unearthed from beneath what is modern day Dover, England. The Bronze Age boat which is about 9.5 meters long × 2.3 meters wide is believed to have been a seagoing vessel. Carbon dating reveals that the craft dating from approximately 1600 BC might be the oldest known sea-going boat. The hull was of half oak logs and side panels also of oak were stitched on with yew lashings. Both the straight-grained oak and yew bindings are now extinct as a shipbuilding method in England. A reconstruction in 1996 proved that a crew between four and sixteen paddlers could have easily propelled the boat during Force 4 winds upwards of four knots but with a maximum of 5 knots (9 km/h). The boat could have easily carried a significant amount of cargo and with a strong crew may have been able to traverse near thirty nautical miles in a day.

=== Northern Europe ===
The Norsemen, or 'people from the North', were people from southern and central Scandinavia which established states and settlements Northern Europe from the late 8th century to the 11th century. Vikings has been a common term for Norsemen in the early medieval period, especially in connection with raids and monastic plundering made by Norsemen in Great Britain and Ireland.

Leif Ericson was an Icelandic explorer known to be the first European to have landed in North America (presumably in Newfoundland, Canada). During a stay in Norway, Leif Ericsson converted to Christianity, like many Norse of that time. He also went to Norway to serve the King of Norway, Olaf Tryggvason. When he returned to Greenland, he bought the boat of Bjarni Herjólfsson and set out to explore the land that Bjarni had found (located west of Greenland), which was, in fact, Newfoundland, in Canada. The Saga of the Greenlanders tells that Leif set out around the year 1000 to follow Bjarni's route with 15 crew members, but going north.

=== Maritime Southeast Asia ===
Austronesians in Maritime Southeast Asia developed very early maritime trade networks in the Neolithic. The first of which is the Maritime Jade Road. It lasted for around 3,000 years, from 2000 BCE to 1000 CE. It was initially established by the indigenous peoples of Taiwan and the Philippines. Raw jade was sourced from deposits in Taiwan and worked into ornaments in the Philippines (the most notable and most numerous of which are double-headed pendants known as lingling-o). This network later included parts of Vietnam, Malaysia, Indonesia, Thailand, and other areas in Southeast Asia where these jade ornaments, along with other trade goods, were exchanged (also known as the Sa Huynh-Kalanay Interaction Sphere). The wide distribution throughout Island Southeast Asia of the ceremonial bronze drums (c. 600 BCE to 400 CE) sourced from the Dong Son culture of northern Vietnam is also evidence of the antiquity and density of this prehistoric Southeast Asian maritime network.

Austronesians also established very early connections (part of the early spice trade networks) with Dravidian-speaking regions in Sri Lanka and Southern India by around 1500 to 600 BCE. These early contacts resulted in the introduction of Austronesian crops and material culture to South Asia, including betel nut chewing, coconuts, sandalwood, domesticated bananas, sugarcane, cloves, and nutmeg. It also introduced Austronesian sailing technologies like outrigger boats which are still utilized in Sri Lanka and southern India. During this period, the distribution of Austronesian trade goods like kapur barus and cloves also reached beyond South Asia to ancient Egypt and the Roman Empire. There is also indirect evidence of very early Austronesian contacts with Africa, based on the presence and spread of Austronesian domesticates like bananas, taro, chickens, and purple yam in Africa in the first millennium BCE.

By around the 2nd century BCE, the prehistoric Austronesian jade and spice trade networks in Southeast Asia fully connected with the maritime trade routes of South Asia, the Middle East, eastern Africa, and the Mediterranean, becoming what is now known as the Maritime Silk Road. Prior to the 10th century, the eastern part of the route was primarily used by Southeast Asian Austronesian traders using distinctive sewn-plank and lashed-lug ships, although Persian and Tamil traders also sailed the western parts of the routes. It allowed the exchange of goods from East and Southeast Asia on one end, all the way to Europe and eastern Africa on the other.

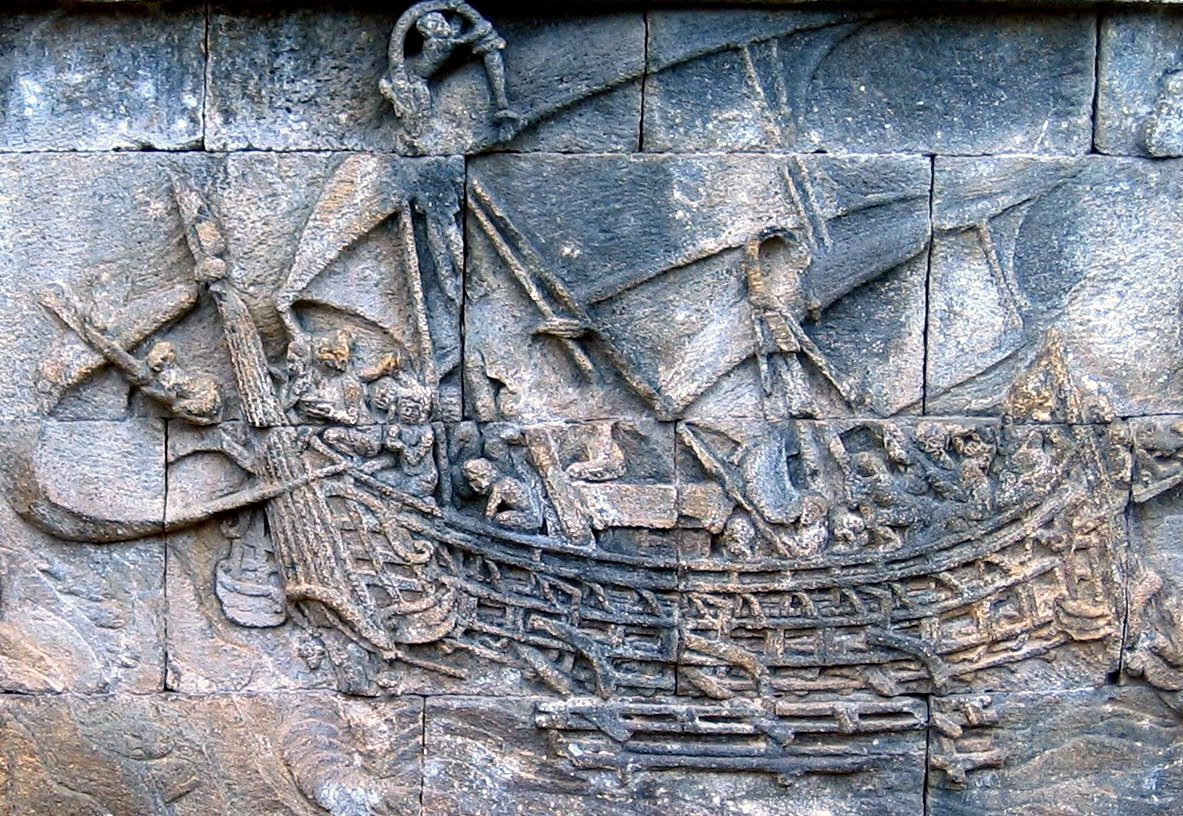
One of the Borobudur ships from the 8th century, they were depictions of large Javanese outrigger vessels. Shown with the characteristic tanja sail of Southeast Asian Austronesians

Austronesian thalassocracies controlled the flow of trade in the eastern regions of the Maritime Silk Road, especially the polities around the straits of Malacca and Bangka, the Malay Peninsula, and the Mekong Delta; through which passed the main routes of the Austronesian trade ships to Giao Chỉ (in the Tonkin Gulf) and Guangzhou (southern China), the endpoints. Secondary routes also passed through the coastlines of the Gulf of Thailand; as well as through the Java Sea, Celebes Sea, Banda Sea, and the Sulu Sea, reconnecting with the main route through the northern Philippines and Taiwan. The secondary routes also continue onward to the East China Sea and the Yellow Sea for a limited extent.

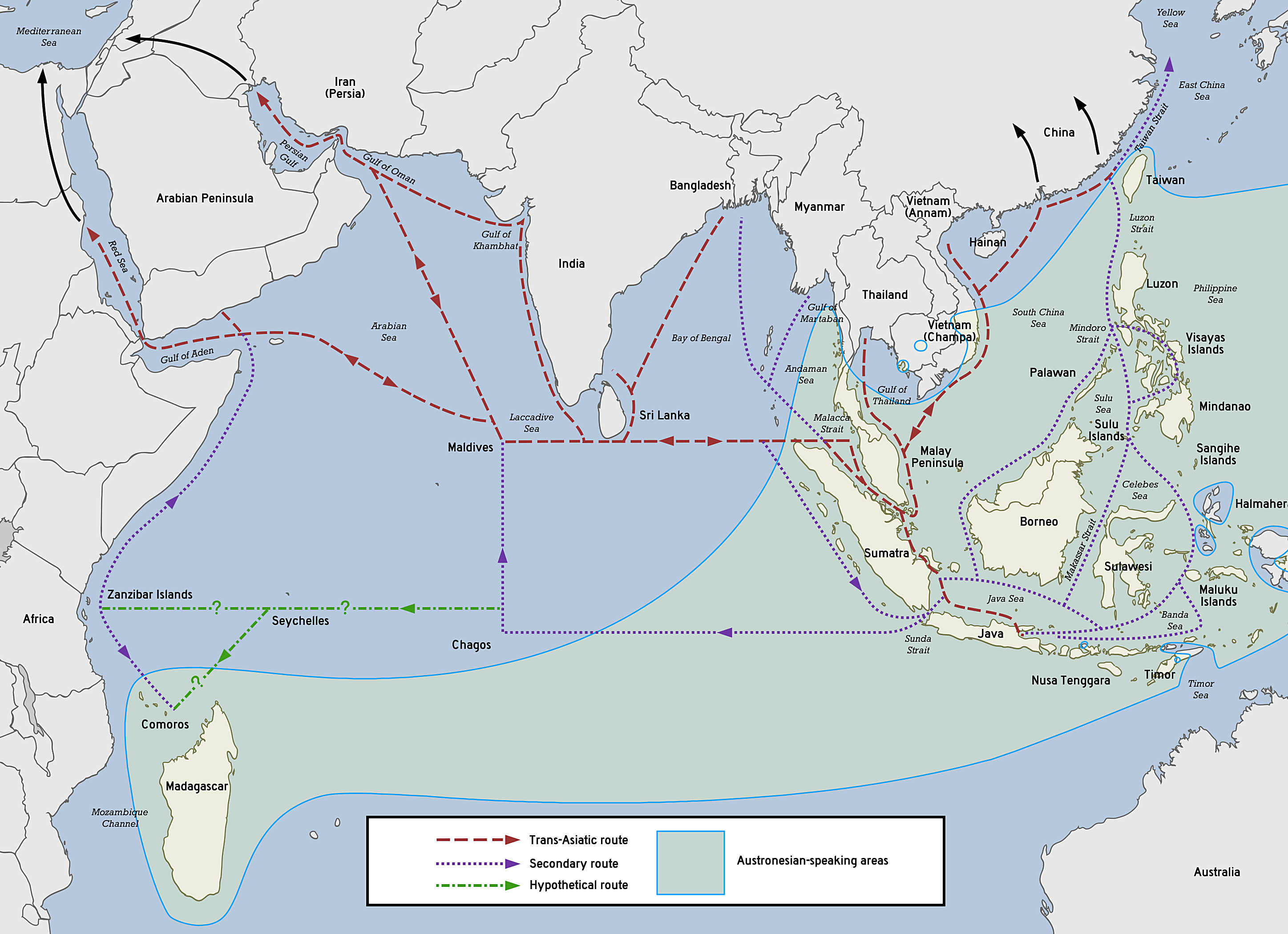
Austronesian proto-historic and historic maritime trade network in the Indian Ocean

The main route of the western regions of the Maritime Silk Road directly crosses the Indian Ocean from the northern tip of Sumatra (or through the Sunda Strait) to Sri Lanka, southern India and Bangladesh, and the Maldives. It branches from here into routes through the Arabian Sea entering the Gulf of Oman (into the Persian Gulf), and the Gulf of Aden (into the Red Sea). Secondary routes also pass through the coastlines of the Bay of Bengal, the Arabian Sea, and southwards along the coast of East Africa to Zanzibar, the Comoros, Madagascar, and the Seychelles. The Maldives was of particular importance as a major hub for Austronesian sailors venturing through the western routes. The Austronesian people also reached Madagascar in the early 1st millennium AD and colonized it.

Han and Tang dynasty Chinese records also indicate that the early Chinese Buddhist pilgrims to South Asia booked passage with the Austronesian ships (which they called the k'un-lun po) that traded in the Chinese port city of Guangzhou. Books written by Chinese monks like Wan Chen and Hui-Lin contain detailed accounts of the large trading vessels from Southeast Asia dating back to at least the 3rd century CE.

Srivijaya, a Hindu-Buddhist Austronesian polity founded at Palembang in 682 CE, rose to dominate the trade in the region around the straits of Malacca and Sunda and the South China Sea emporium by controlling the trade in luxury aromatics and Buddhist artifacts from West Asia to a thriving Tang market. It emerged through the conquest and subjugation of neighboring thalassocracies. These included Melayu, Kedah, Tarumanagara, and Mataram, among others. These polities controlled the sea lanes in Southeast Asia and exploited the spice trade of the Spice Islands, as well as maritime trade-routes between India and China.

The Butuan boat burials of the Philippines, which feature eleven lashed-lug boat remains of the Austronesian boatbuilding traditions (individually dated from 689 CE to 988 CE), were found in association with large amounts of trade goods from China, Cambodia, Thailand (Haripunjaya and Satingpra), Vietnam, and as far as Persia, indicating they traded as far as the Middle East.

These maritime routes persisted (with increasing participation of other maritime cultures) into the medieval era, before declining and being replaced with European trade routes during the colonial era in the 15th century.

=== Indian subcontinent ===
In the Indian maritime history, the world's first tidal dock was built in phase II of Lothal during the Harappan civilisation near the present day Mangrol harbour on the Gujarat coast. Other ports were probably at Balakot and Dwarka. However, it is probable that many small-scale ports, and not massive ports, were used for the Harappan maritime trade. Ships from the harbour at these ancient port cities established trade with Mesopotamia, where the Indus Valley may have been known as Meluhha.

Emperor Chandragupta Maurya's Prime Minister Kautilya's Arthashastra devotes a full chapter on the state department of waterways under nāvādhyakṣa (Sanskrit for Superintendent of ships). The terms, nāvā dvīpāntaragamanam (Sanskrit for sailing to other lands by ships) and samudrasaṁyānam (maritime travel) appear in the work.

The Maritime history of Kalinga (now Odisha) is an important highlight of the traditions of Indian maritime history as it was influential in establishing trading links with Southeast Asia along the Maritime Silk Road. The people of this region of eastern India along the coast of the Bay of Bengal sailed up and down the Indian coast, and travelled to Indo China and throughout Maritime Southeast Asia, introducing elements of their culture to the people with whom they traded. The 6th century Mañjuśrīmūlakalpa mentions the Bay of Bengal as 'Kaliṅgodra' and historically the Bay of Bengal has been called 'Kaliṅga Sāgara' (both Kaliṅgodra and Kalinga Sagara mean Kalinga Sea), indicating the importance of Kalinga in the maritime trade.

=== Japan ===
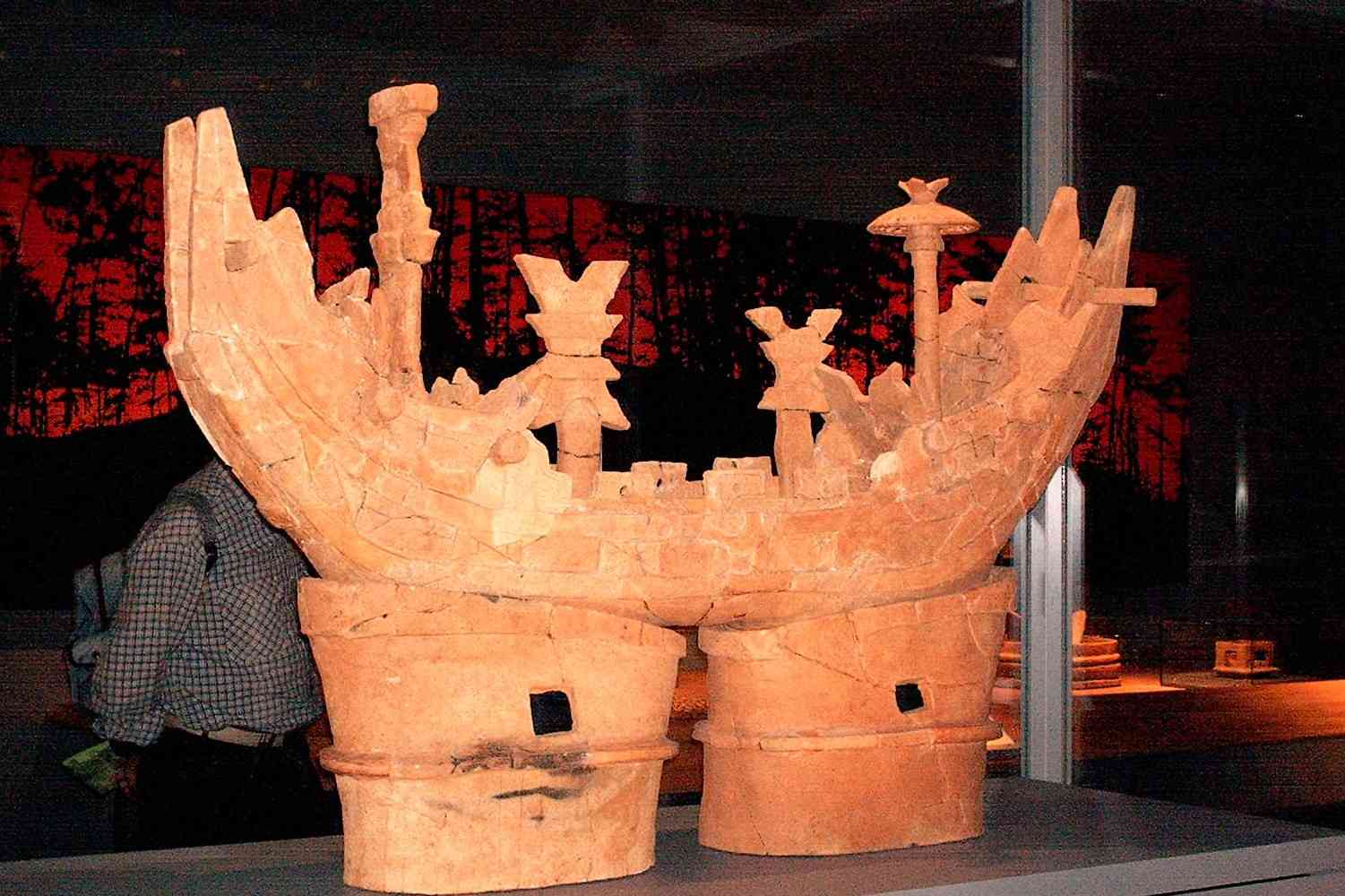
A clay figure of a haniwa model of a ship, from Japan's Kofun period (250–538); during the Three Kingdoms of Korea, the Japanese sided with Baekje against a naval alliance between the Chinese Tang dynasty and Korean Silla.

Japan had a navy by at least the 6th century, with their invasions and involvement in political alliances during the Three Kingdoms of Korea. A joint alliance between the Korean Silla Kingdom and the Chinese Tang dynasty (618–907 AD) heavily defeated the Japanese and their Korean allies of Baekje in the Battle of Baekgang on August 27 to August 28 of the year 663 AD. This decisive victory expelled the Japanese force from Korea and allowed the Tang and Silla to conquer Goguryeo.

=== Ancient Rome ===
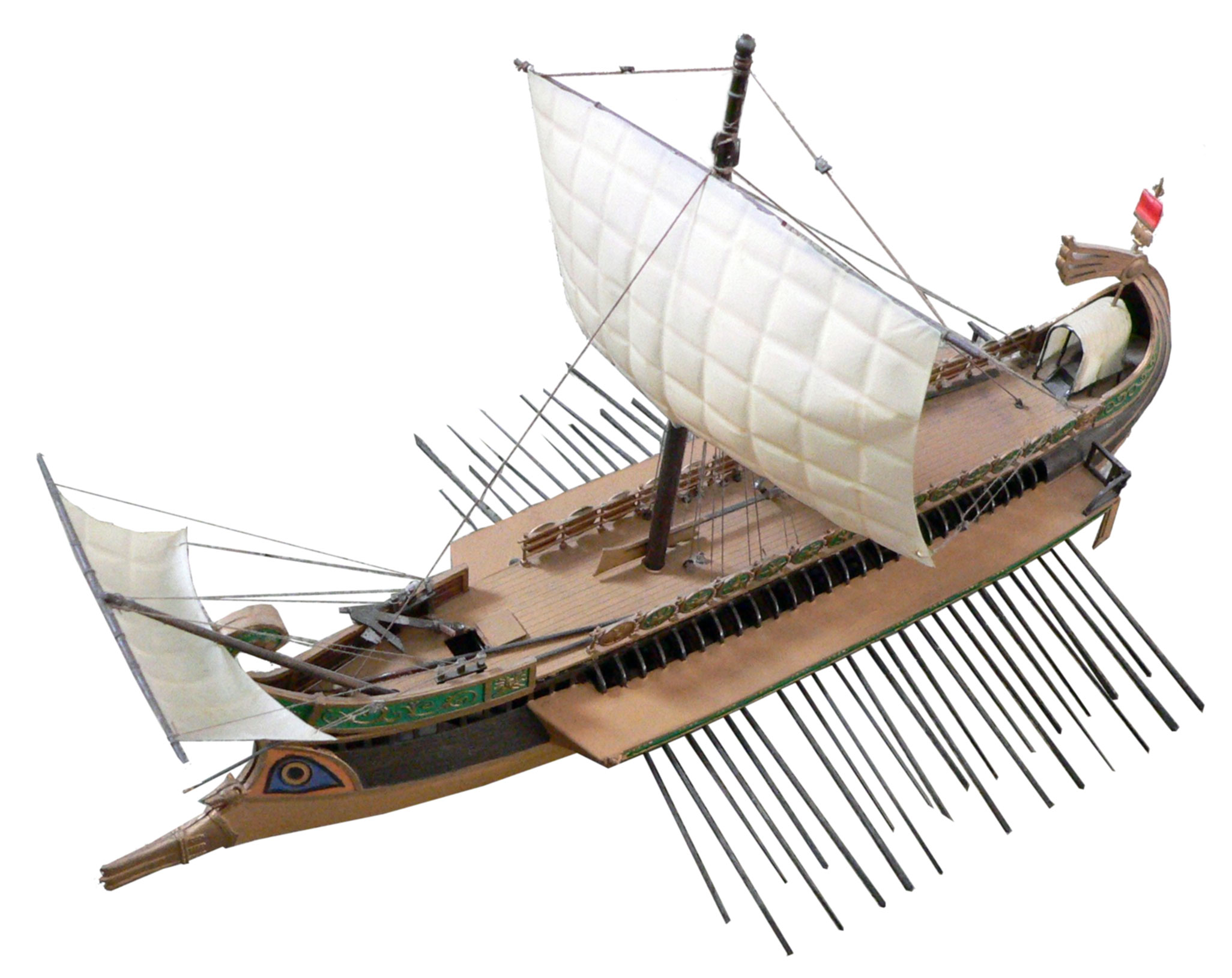
Model of a Roman bireme

Ancient Rome had a variety of ships that played crucial roles in its military, trade, and transportation activities. Rome was preceded in the use of the sea by other ancient, seafaring civilizations of the Mediterranean. The galley was a long, narrow, highly maneuverable ship powered by oarsmen, sometimes stacked in multiple levels such as biremes or triremes, and many of which also had sails. Initial efforts of the Romans to construct a war fleet were based on copies of Carthaginian warships. In the Punic Wars in the mid-third century BCE, the Romans were at first outclassed by Carthage at sea, but by 256 BCE had drawn even and fought the wars to a stalemate. In 55 BCE Julius Caesar used warships and transport ships to invade Britain. Numerous types of transport ships were used to carry foodstuffs or other trade goods around the Mediterranean, many of which did double duty and were pressed into service as warships or troop transports in time of war. Roman ships are named in different ways, often in compound expressions with the word Latin: navis, lit. 'ship'. These are found in many ancient Roman texts, and named in different ways, such as by the appearance of the ship: for example, navis tecta (covered ship); or by its function, for example: navis mercatoria (commerce ship), or navis praedatoria (plunder ship). Others, like navis frumentaria (grain), navis lapidaria (stones), and navis vivaria (live fish), are about the cargo. The Althiburos mosaic in Tunisia lists many types of ships. The expression naves longae (lit. "long ships") is the plural of the noun phrase navis longa ("long ship"), following the rules for pluralization of feminine, third declension nouns in Latin, and inflectional agreement of the adjective longus to match.

North America

Across the Atlantic ocean, many coastal Native American tribes developed their own trade routes. For example, the Coast Salish people of the Pacific Northwest traveled through the Puget Sound and Salish Sea to trade. This usually went from North to South, and vice versa, mirroring the modern Interstate-5 that is used for similar purposes today.

== See also ==
- History of navigation
- Maritime timeline
- Naumachia
- Pre-Columbian transoceanic contact theories
- Pre-Columbian rafts
- Ships of ancient Rome
