= Ibra (disambiguation) =

Ibra is a city in the Ash Sharquiyah Region of Oman.

IBRA is the Interim Biogeographic Regionalisation for Australia.

Ibra or IBRA may also refer to:

- Ibra (Aula), river in Hesse, Germany
- (..)ibra, 23rd century BC Meluhha ruler mentioned in relation to Naram-Sin of Akkad
- Zlatan Ibrahimović (born 1981), Swedish footballer often called Ibra
- International Bee Research Association
- Indonesian Bank Restructuring Agency
