= Ibra (Aula) =

River in Germany

Location
- Country: Germany
- States: Hesse

Physical characteristics
- Mouth
  - location: Aula
  - coordinates: 50.8327°N 9.5691°E

Basin features
- Progression: Aula→ Fulda→ Weser→ North Sea

The Ibra is a small river of Hesse, Germany. It flows into the Aula on the right bank in Kirchheim and belongs to the river system and catchment area of the Weser.

== See also ==
- List of rivers of Hesse
