= Economy of Sumer =

The Sumerian economy refers to the systems of trade in ancient Mesopotamia. Sumerian city-states relied on trade due to a lack of certain materials, which had to be brought in from other regions. Their trade networks extended to places such as Oman, Arabia, Anatolia, the Indus Valley , and the Iranian Plateau. Sumerians also bought and sold property, but land tied to the temples could not be traded. There were three types of land—Nigenna, Kurra, and Urulal—and only Urulal land could be traded; Nigenna land belonged to the temple, while Kurra land belonged to the people working in the temple. Within Sumer, the Sumerians could use silver, barley, or cattle as currency.

== Trade and resources ==
Trade was important in Sumerian society as Mesopotamia lacked essential materials such as stone, metals, and wood. Wool, lapis lazuli, gold, copper and iron were all very important resources in Mesopotamia. Mesopotamia also traded with areas in Arabia for incense and exotic products. Sumer may have had copper and stone sourced from places as far as Oman. Resins from Frankincense and Myrrh trees were likely imported to Sumerian cities from cities in southern Oman, most notably Ubar, was a trade center for these resins and many of the trade routes from the Dhofar region run through Magan-Sumer Territories. The Sumerians would have prized these resins as they could be used for many purposes, from ritual to medical reasons, resin was highly prized. Iran was the primary source of most wood, stone, and metal for Mesopotamia. Although the most prized wood, cedar, came from Lebanon. Dilmun provided copper, carnelian, beads, and lapis lazuli to Sumer. Carnelian was also supplied by the Indus River Valley Civilization, who also had a large textile trade with Sumer. Gudea supposedly imported translucent Carnelian from the Indus River Valley Civilization. In Ur, Kish, and Babylon seals from the Indus River Valley have been found. Aratta supplied gold and lapis lazuli. Failaka Island, Tarout Island, and Uzbekistan supplied chlorite to Mesopotamia. Sogdia supplied lapis lazuli. An area called Su-land and another area known as Mardaman supplied gold to Sumer. Su-land was most likely in Iran while Mardaman was in Turkey. Areas around the Kokcha river supplied lapis lazuli and Tin came from places east of the Iranian plateau. Many Sumerian resources came from mountains. Carnelian came from the Alborz mountain and Mt Meluhha. Lapis Lazuli came from Mt. Dapara, Badakhshan, and Alvand. Hahhum, Mt. Bahtar, and Meluḫḫa could have supplied gold to Mesopotamia. Agriculture was another very important part of the Mesopotamian economy. The agricultural trade extended to Anatolia and Iran. Sheep, pig, cattle herding as well as cereal were important parts of Sumerian agriculture. It also depended on maintenance of irrigation canals. A centralized organization was established to manage agriculture.

== Property ==
Most tablets from Sumer dating back to before Sargon are records of temple logistics. However, many tablets show citizens buying and selling land and property. One tablet found in Lagash documents the sale of land to the king, implying that the king could not confiscate property. Other tablets indicate that even poorer citizens owned fish ponds, gardens, and houses. Most of the land was owned by the nobility. Nobles owned large estates where most of the land was purchased from poorer citizens. It is possible the temple dominated the land and the economy. The temples did own land that could not be bought, sold, or alienated. There were three types of temple property. Nigenna property was property reserved for the maintenance of the temple. Kurra land was land dedicated to the people working for the temple. Urulal land was land given to others in exchange for other land.

== Money ==
Barley and silver were the materials used by institutions to keep track of their goods. Usually, they did this with a fixed rate between them. Silver was also used as a means of payment. Silver would be imported from silver mines in Keban, Dilmun, Aratta, Marḫashi, Meluḫḫa, Azerbaijan, and Kerman. Anatolia was likely the largest supplier of silver for Sumer. Cattle may have also been the standard currency in Sumeria. If cattle were the standard currency interest would be paid through the cattle giving birth. Debt was also an important aspect of Sumerian trade. Many transactions involved debt, such as the goods consigned to temples. Debt could be paid back in barley or silver. Loans also existed in the Sumerian economy. Rural loans would emerge as a result of unpaid obligations to an institution. Occasionally leaders would cancel all rural debt in order to ensure peasants never became so poor that they would take up arms against the government. The word for interest in the Sumerian language is mash, which also is the word calves. Implying that interest rates were derived from cattle reproduction. It also might mean that the cattle giving birth is what paid off interest.
