= Aula (river) =

River in Germany

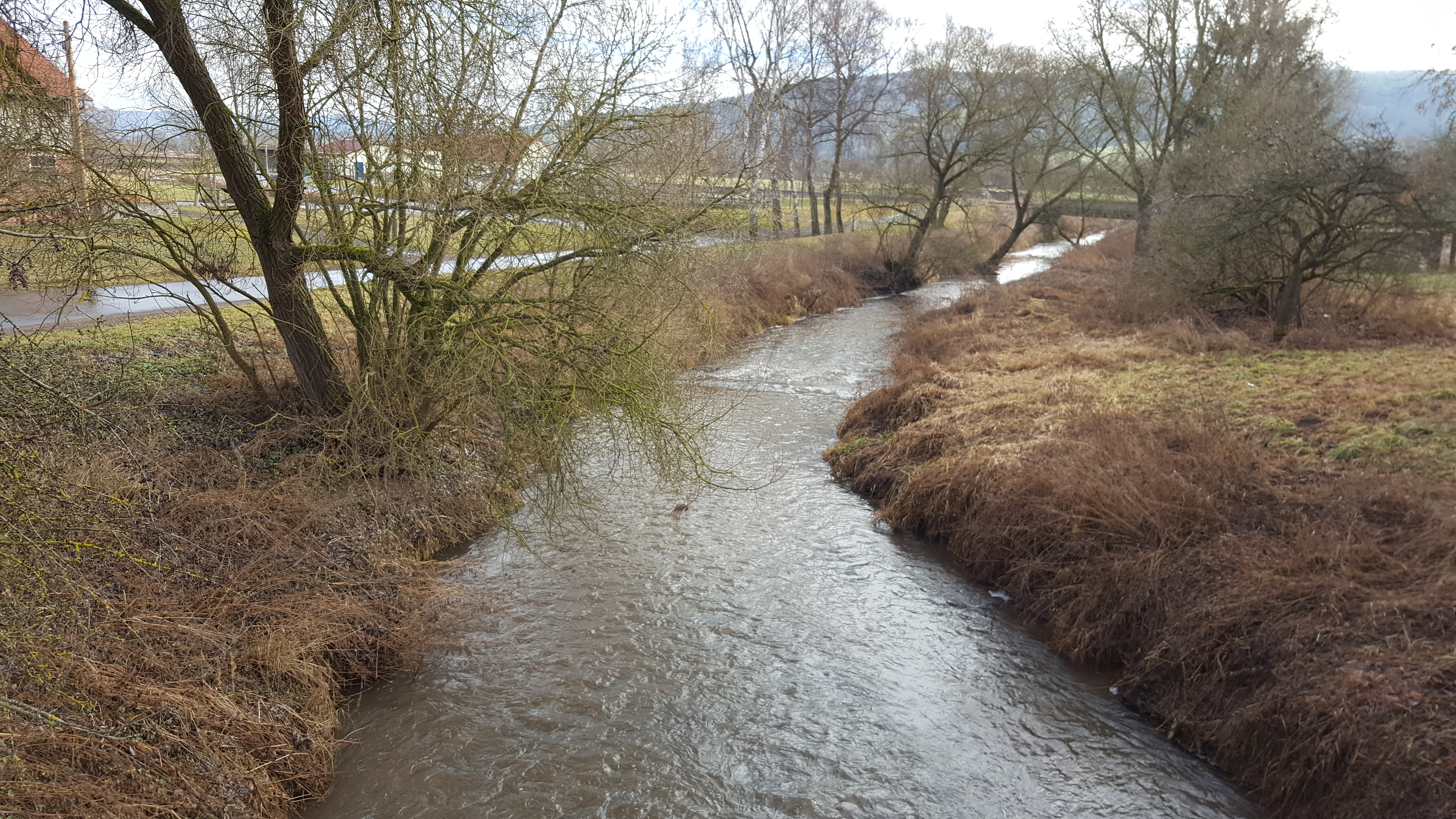

- Location of the mouth in Hesse

Location
- Country: Germany
- State: Hesse

Physical characteristics
- Mouth
  - location: Fulda
  - coordinates: 50.7974°N 9.6141°E
- Length: 22.6 km (14.0 mi)

Basin features
- Progression: Fulda→ Weser→ North Sea

Aula is a river of Hesse, Germany. The 22.6-km Aula is a 22.6 km long tributary of the Fulda, joining it in Niederaula.

== See also ==
- List of rivers of Hesse
