= (..)ibra =

- King of Meluhha
- Reign: Possibly between c. 2300–2200 BC

(..)ibra was a king of Meluhha according to an inscription attributed to the reign of Naram-Sin of Akkad (2254–2218 BC). (..) is not part of the true name of the king, but rather an epigraphical symbol indicating that the name was only partly readable in the inscription.

== Inscription ==
Naram-Sin (2254–2218 BC) was the third successor and grandson of Sargon of Akkad (2334–2279 BC).

He listed the various rebel kings to his rule, and mentioned "(..)ibra, man of Meluhha".

== Significance ==
(..)ibra is the only attested ruler of Meluhha. His kingdom has been identified with the Indus Valley Civilisation and so, the inscription might provide some insights into the relationship between the Harappans and the Mesopotamians.

== See also ==
- Meluhha
- Sargon of Akkad
- Naram-Sin of Akkad
