= Meluhha =

Prominent trading partner of Sumer during the Middle Bronze Age

Meluhha
𒈨𒈛𒄩𒆠

Location of foreign lands for the Mesopotamians, including Meluhha.

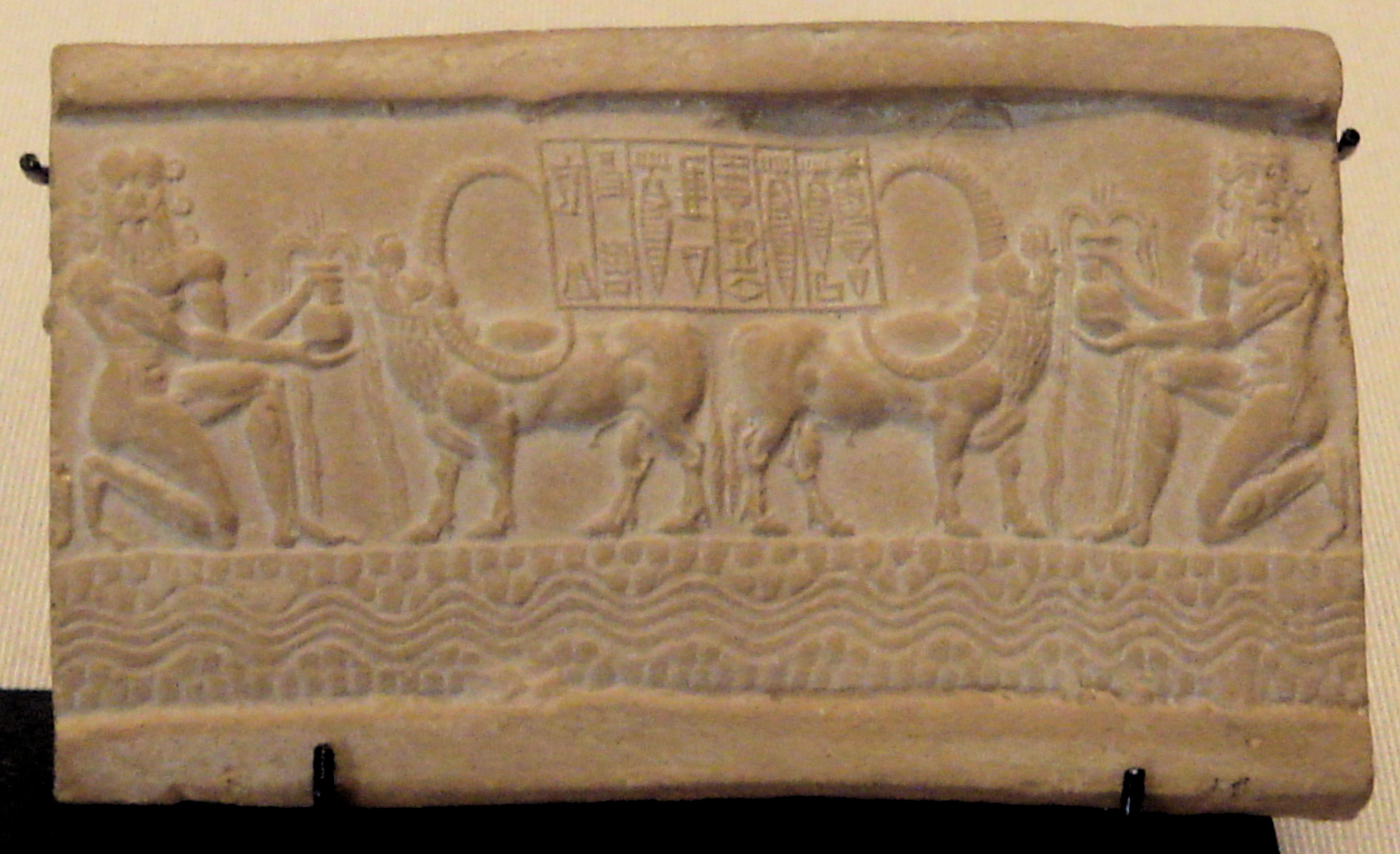
Impression of a cylinder seal of the Akkadian Empire, with label: "The Divine Sharkalisharri Prince of Akkad, Ibni-Sharrum the Scribe his servant". The long-horned buffalo is thought to have come from the Indus Valley, and testifies to exchanges with Meluhha, the Indus Valley civilization. Circa 2217–2193 BC. Louvre Museum.

Meluḫḫa or Melukhkha (Sumerian: 𒈨𒈛𒄩𒆠 Me-luḫ-ḫa^{KI}) is the Sumerian name of a prominent trading partner of Sumer during the Middle Bronze Age. Its identification remains an open question, but most scholars associate it with the Indus Valley Civilisation.

== Etymology ==
Asko Parpola identifies Proto-Dravidians with the Harappan Culture and the Meluhhan people mentioned in Sumerian records. In his book Deciphering the Indus Script. Parpola states that the Brahui people of Pakistan are remnants of the Harappan culture. According to him, the word "Meluhha" derives from the Dravidian words mel ("elevated") and akam ("place"). Parpola also relates Meluhha with Balochistan, which he calls the "Proto-Dravidian homeland". He also relates Meluhha with the transient word Mleccha, a Vedic word used to mean "barbarian" and used by the incoming Indo-Aryan speaking population for the native Harappan population.

Another piece of possible evidence that points to the people of Meluhha as being Proto-Dravidian is the fact that sesame oil believed to be exported to Mesopotamia by the Harappans, was known as ilu in Sumerian and eḷḷu in Akkadian. One theory is that these words derive from the Dravidian word for sesame (eḷḷ or eḷḷu). However, Michael Witzel, who associates IVC with the ancestors of Munda speakers, suggests an alternative etymology from the para-Munda word for wild sesame: jar-tila. Munda is an Austroasiatic language.

== Trade with Sumer ==
Mesopotamian "Meluhha" seal
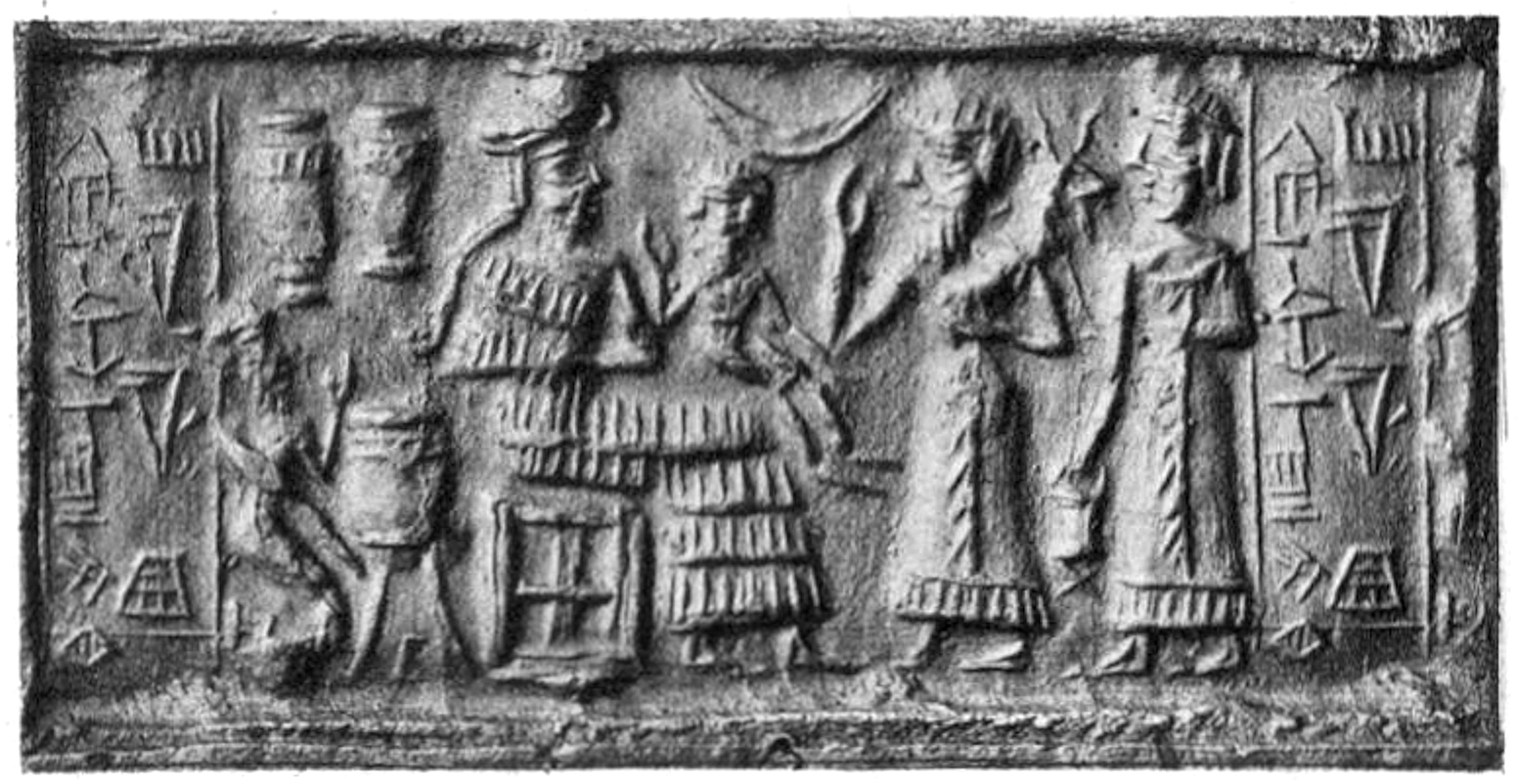
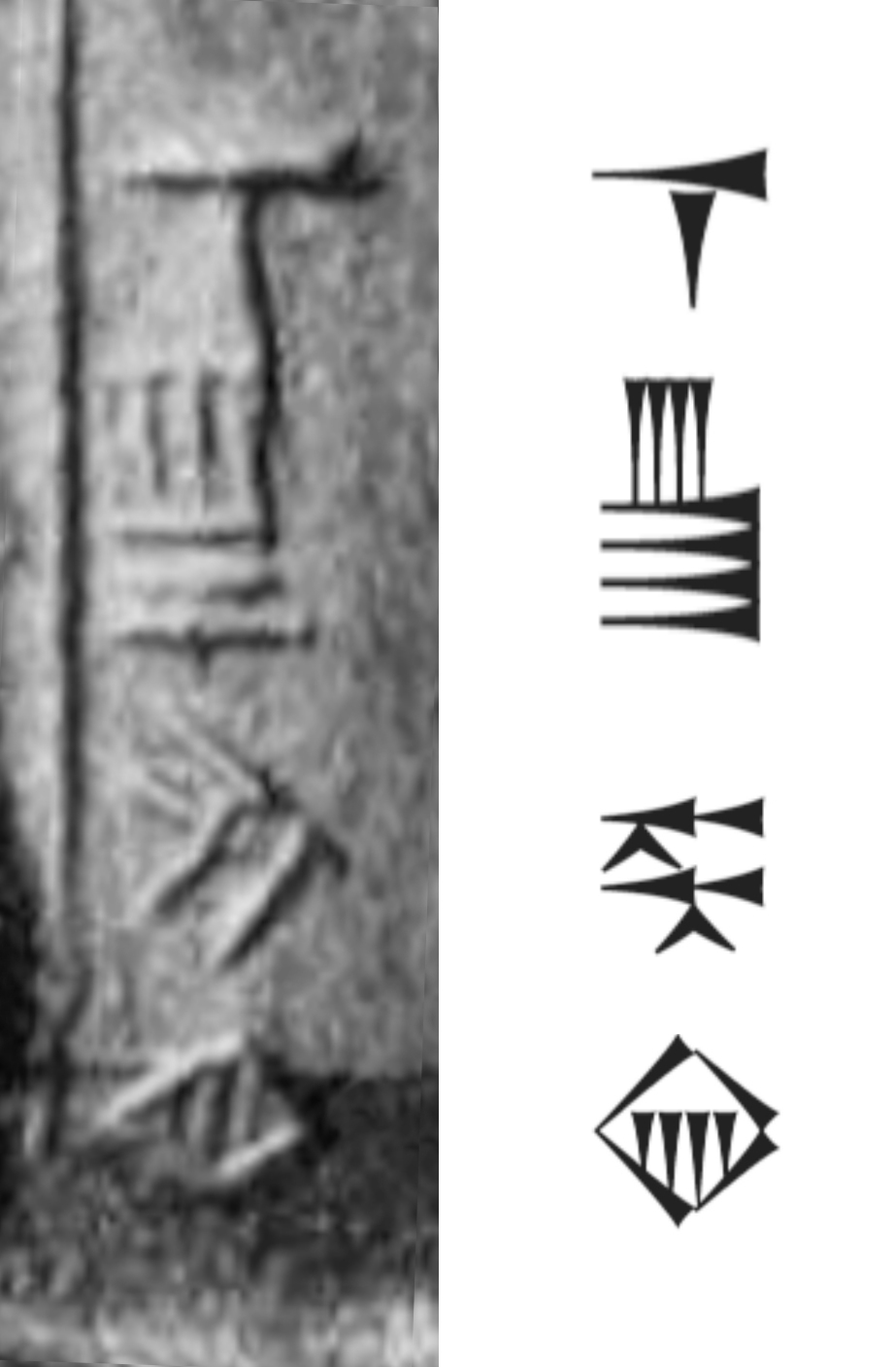
Akkadian Empire cylinder seal with inscription: "Šu-ilišu, interpreter of the Meluhhan language": "Meluhha" appears with the standard cuneiform as 𒈨𒈛𒄩𒆠 (Me-luḫ-ḫa^{KI}, "KI" standing for "country"). Louvre Museum, reference AO 22310.

Sumerian texts repeatedly refer to three important centers with which they traded: Magan, Dilmun, and Meluhha. The Sumerian location of Magan is now accepted to be the area currently encompassing the United Arab Emirates and Oman. Dilmun was a Persian Gulf civilization which traded with Mesopotamian civilizations. The current scholarly consensus is that Dilmun encompassed Bahrain, Failaka Island and the adjacent coast of Eastern Arabia in the Persian Gulf.

=== Inscriptions ===
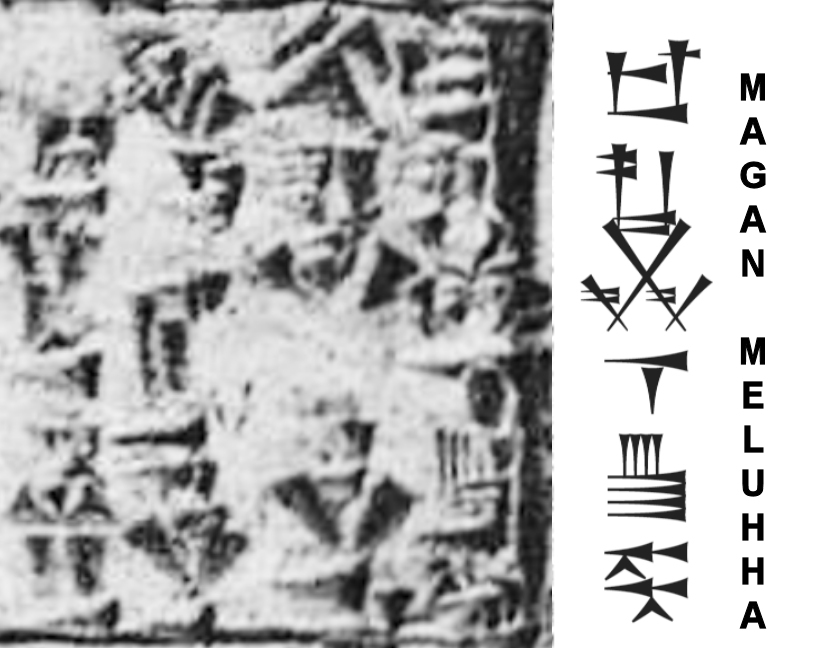
Gudea cylinders inscription A IX:19, Gudea mentions of the devotions to his Temple: "Magan and Meluhha will come down from their mountains to attend". The words Magan (𒈣𒃶) and Meluhha (𒈨𒈛𒄩) appear vertically in the first column on the right.

In an inscription, Sargon of Akkad (2334–2279 BCE) referred to ships coming from Meluhha, Magan and Dilmun. His grandson Naram-Sin (2254–2218 BCE) listing the rebel kings to his rule, mentioned "(..)ibra, man of Melukha". In an inscription, Gudea of Lagash (c. 21st century BCE) referred to the Meluhhans who came to Sumer to sell gold dust, carnelian, etc. In the Gudea cylinders, Gudea mentions that:

"I will spread in the world respect for my Temple, under my name the whole universe will gather in it, and Magan and Meluhha will come down from their mountains to attend."

— Inscription of cylinder A, IX:19

In cylinder B, XIV, he mentions his procurement of "blocks of lapis lazuli and bright carnelian from Meluhha".

Meluhha is also mentioned in mythological legends such as Enki and Ninhursag:

"May the foreign land of Meluhha load precious desirable cornelian, perfect mes wood and beautiful aba wood into large ships for you"

— Enki and Ninhursag

There are no known mentions of Meluhha after 1760 BCE.

==== "Meluhha dog" ====
"Meluhha dog"
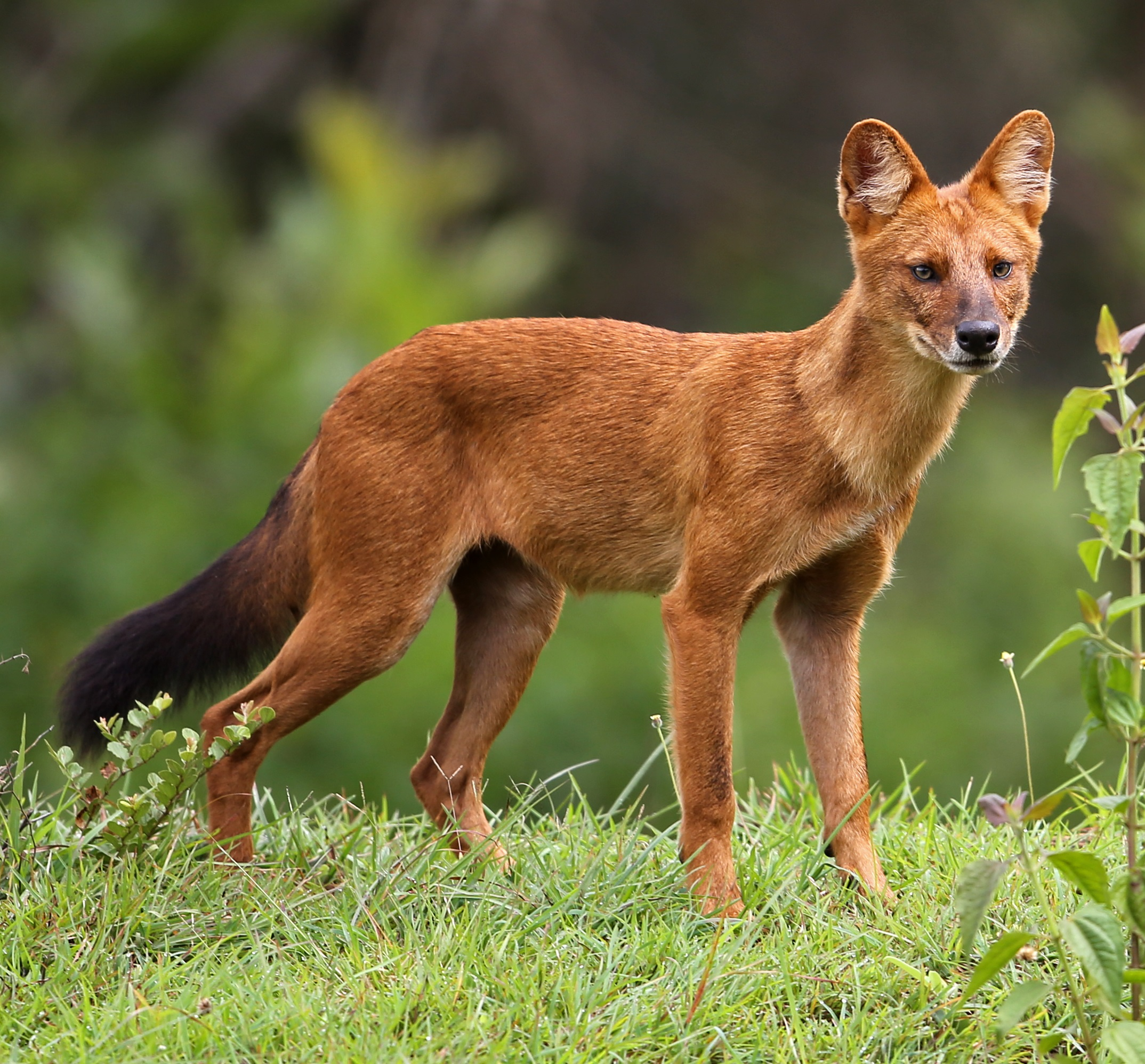
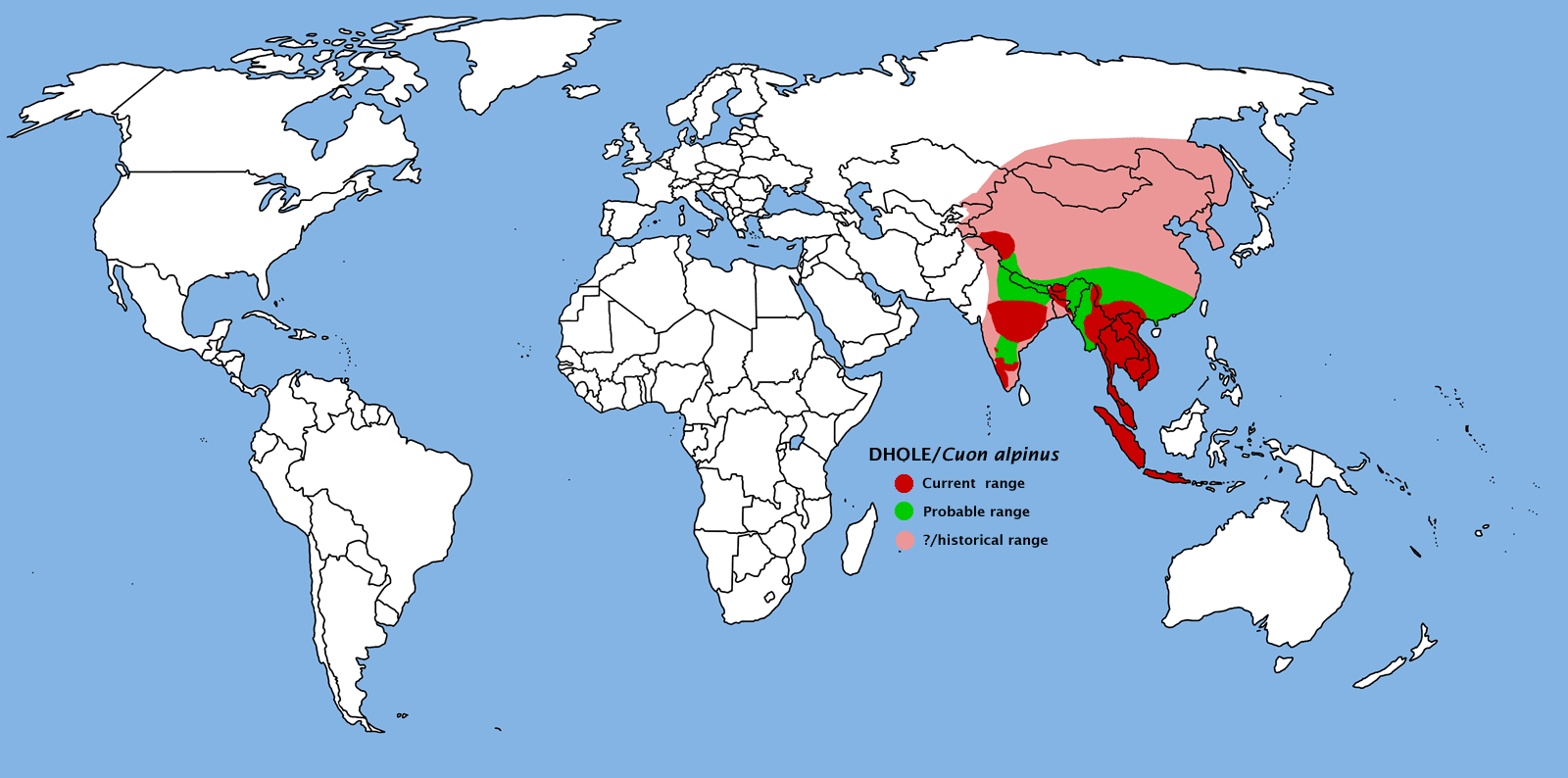
The "red dog from Meluhha", received by Ibbi-Sin as a tribute of the people of Marhashi, could be a dhole, also called "Asiatic red dog", a type of red-colored dog native to southern and Eastern Asia. The Ethiopian wolf (also called the red jackal) is another candidate.

In one of his inscriptions, Ibbi-Sin mentions that he received as a tribute from Marhasi a Meluhha red dog:

"Ibbi-Sîn, the god of his country, the mighty king, king of Ur and king of the four world quarters, his speckled Meluḫḫa 'dog', from Marḫaši brought by them as tribute, a replica of it he fashioned, and for his life he dedicated it to him (Nanna)."

— Meluhha dog inscription of Inni-Sin.

The qualifier used to describe the dog is 𒁱, which can be read either dar "red" as an adjective, or gun_{3} "speckled" as an intransitive verb, and interpretations vary based on these two possible meanings.

It is thought that this "red dog" could be a dhole, also called "Asiatic red dog", a type of red-colored dog native to southern and eastern Asia.

==== Meluhhan trading colony in Sumer ====
Towards the end of the Sumerian period, there are numerous mentions in inscriptions of a Meluhha settlement in southern Sumer near the city-state of Girsu. Most of the references seem to date to the Akkadian Empire and especially the Ur III period. The location of the settlement has been tentatively identified with the city of Gu'abba. The references to "large boats" in Guabba suggests that it may have functioned as a trading colony which initially had direct contact with Meluhha.

It seems that direct trade with Meluhha subsided during the Ur III period, and was replaced by trade with Dilmun, possibly corresponding to the end of urban systems in the Indus Valley around that time.

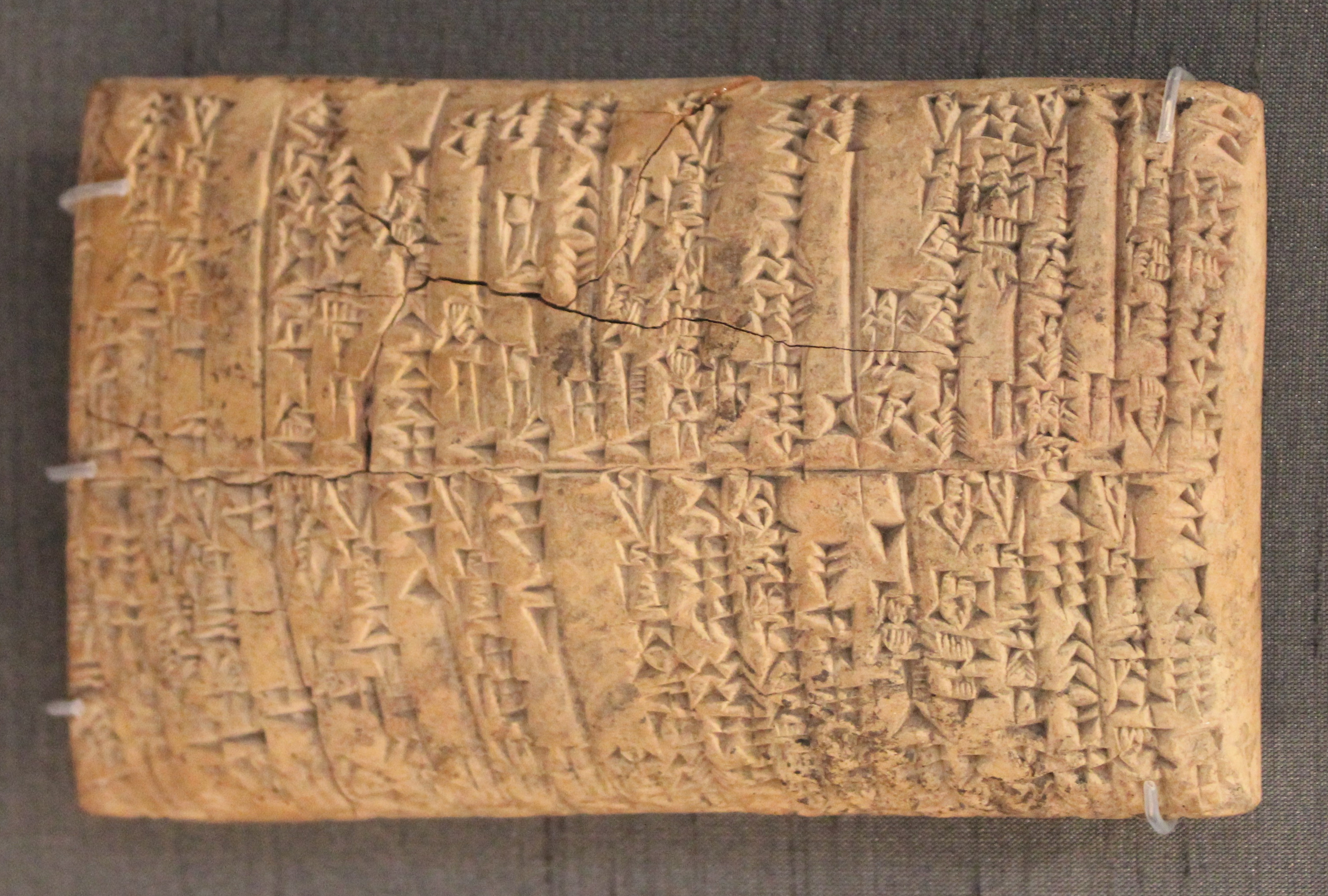
A tablet from the period of Shulgi, mentioning the "Meluhha" village in Sumer. British Museum, BM 17751. "Meluhha" (𒈨𒈛𒄩𒆠) actually appears on the beginning of the other side (column II, 1) in the sentence "The granary of the village of Meluhha".

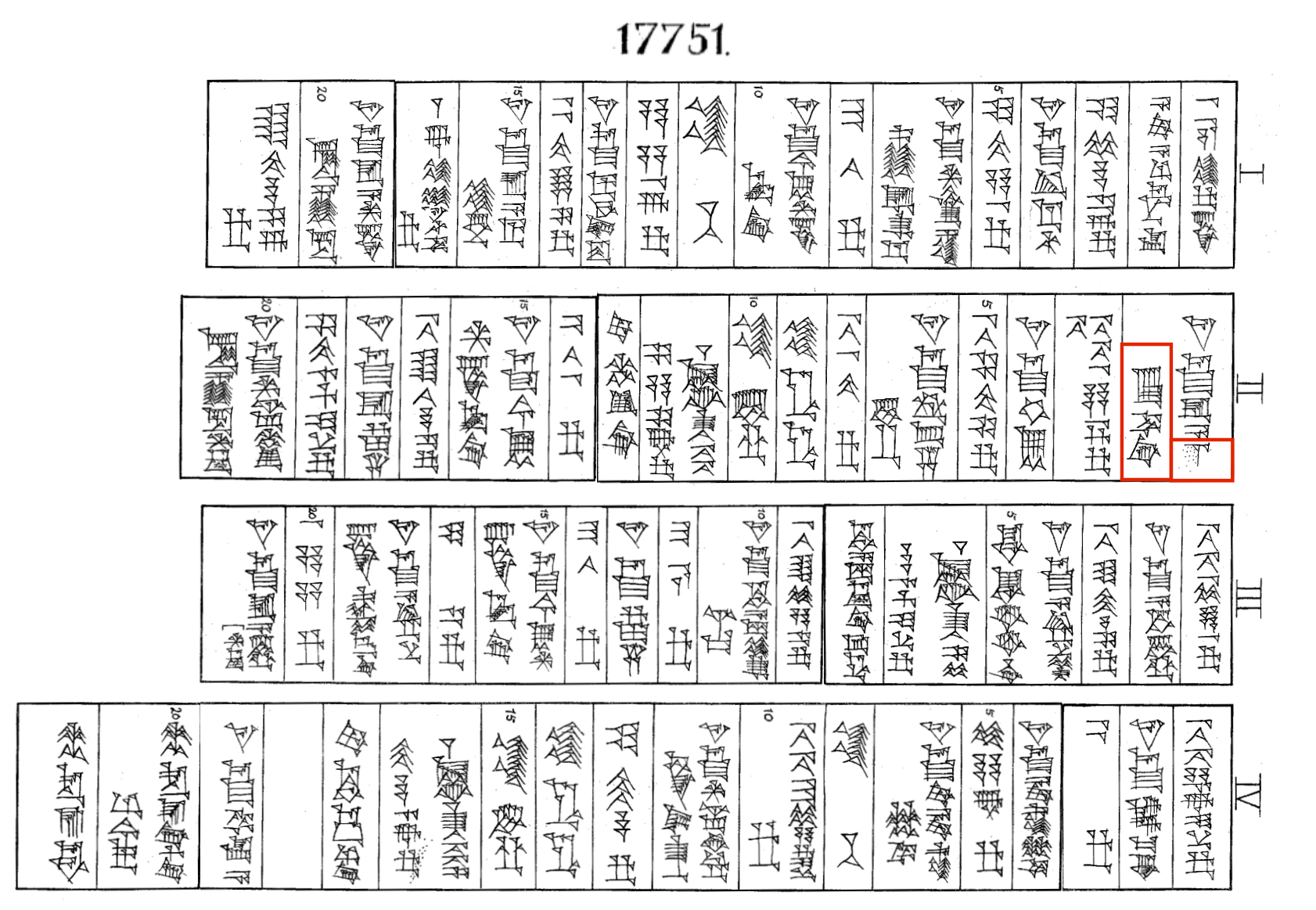
Transcription of tablet BM 17751, with the word "Meluhha" (𒈨𒈛𒄩𒆠). Column II continues Column I on the reverse.

=== Artifacts ===
"Animal figurines"

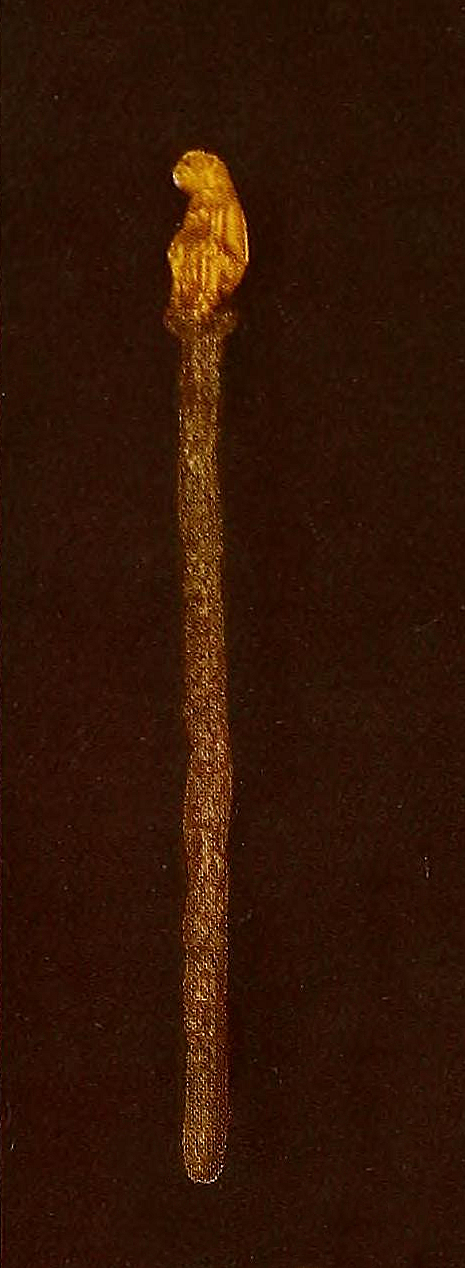
Gold monkey on a pin, from the tomb of Meskalamdug, Royal Cemetery at Ur, circa 2600 BCE.

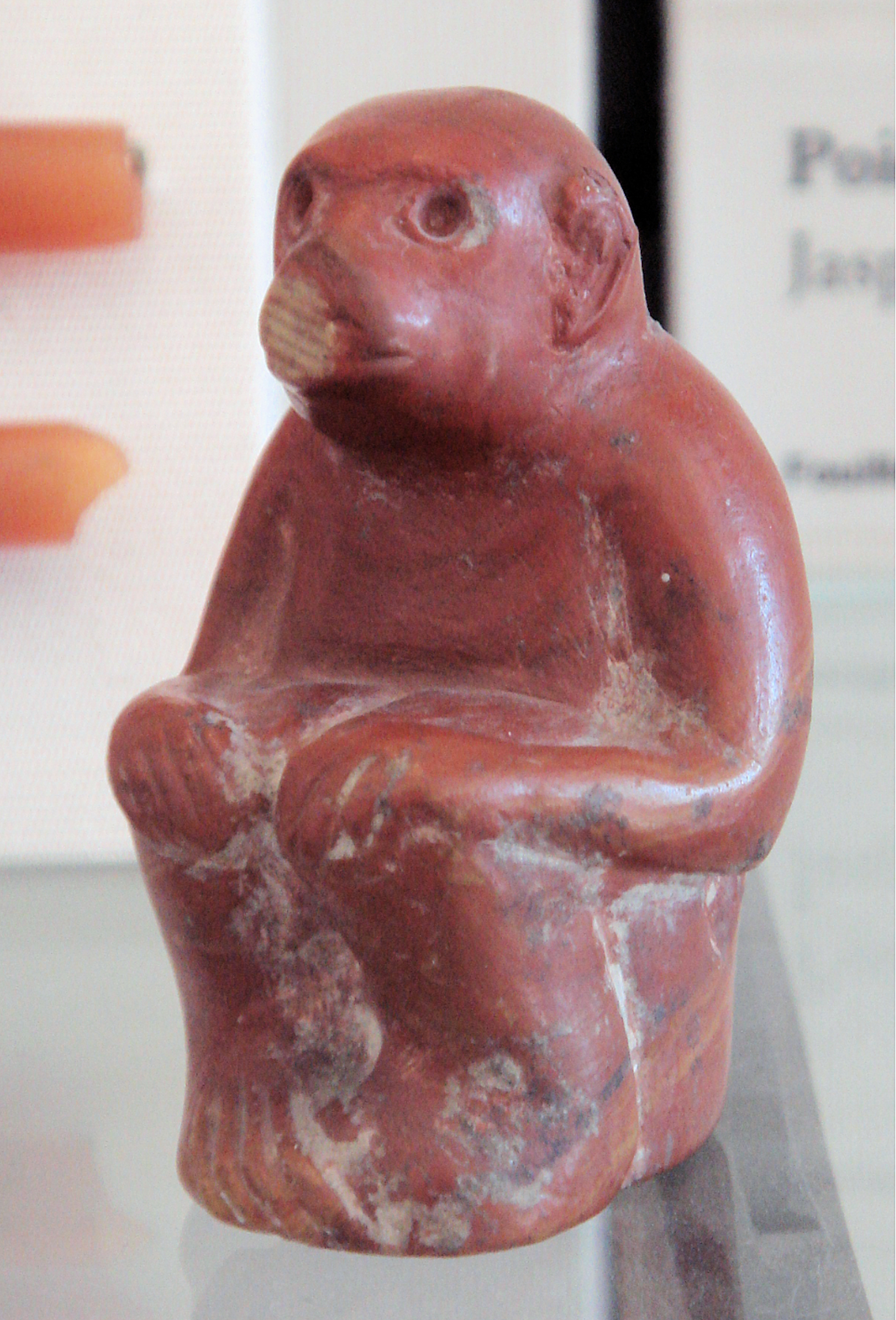
Asian monkey statuette in red limestone found in Susa, dated to 2340–2100 BCE, discovered in the Tel of the Acropolis at Susa. Louvre Museum, Sb5884.

Several Indus seals with Harappan script have been found in Mesopotamia, particularly in Ur, Babylon and Kish. Still, the archeological record for the existence of the trade with the Indus civilization in Mesopotamia is meager. According to Andrew Robinson:

On the other hand, there is not nearly so much incontrovertible evidence for the Indus–Mesopotamia trade as archaeologists might wish. Nissen refers to a ‘meagre archaeological record’. There is only one Indus weight from Ur, for example, out of a total of just fourteen Indus weights found in Mesopotamia, neighbouring Iran (Susa) and the Persian Gulf area. Only some twenty Indus seals have turned up in Mesopotamia since the earliest discoveries, of which nine have been dated to the Akkadian period (2334–2154 BC) and two to the Isin and Larsa dynasties (2000–1800 BC).

==== Animal figurines ====
Various figurines of exotic animals in gold or carnelian are thought to have been imported from Meluhha. Many such statuettes have been found in Mesopotamian excavations. The carnelian statuette of an Asian monkey was found in the excavation of the Acropolis of Susa, and dated to circa 2340–2100 BCE. It is thought that it may have been imported from the Indus Valley region. It is now in the Louvre Museum, reference Sb5884.

=== Maritime materials trade ===
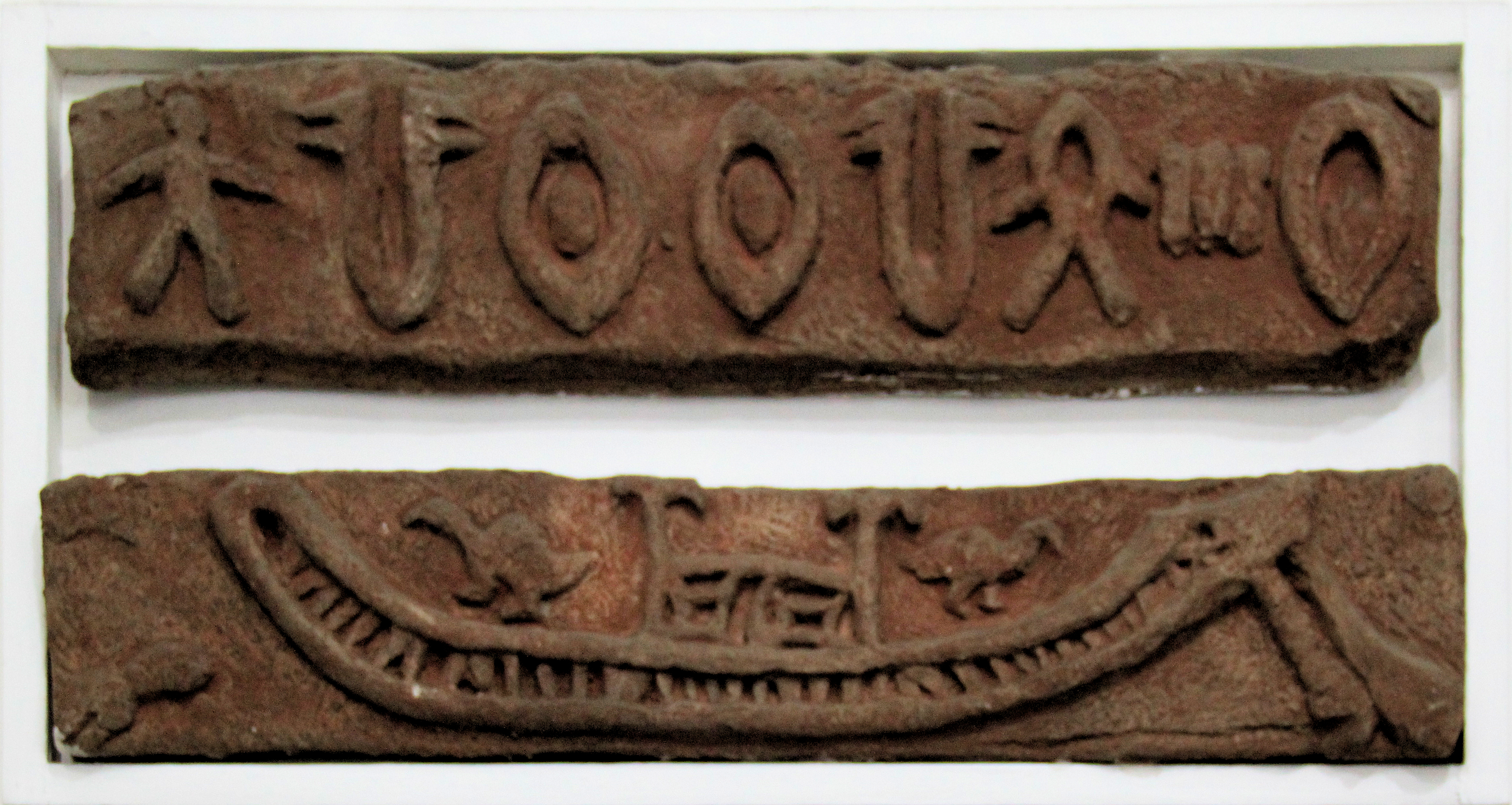
Model of a Mohenjo-daro tablet, 2500–1750 BCE (National Museum, New Delhi), depicting a boat with a central cabin, possibly carrying land-seeking birds for navigation. Flat-bottomed river row-boats appear in two Indus seals, but their seaworthiness is debatable.

Specific items of high volume trade are timber and specialty wood such as ebony, for which large ships were used. Luxury items also appear, such as lapis lazuli mined at a Harappan colony at Shortugai (modern Badakhshan in northern Afghanistan). In the 1980s, important archaeological discoveries were made at Ras al-Jinz (Oman), located at the easternmost point of the Arabian Peninsula, demonstrating maritime Indus Valley connections with Oman, and the Middle East in general.

== Conflict with the Akkadians and Neo-Sumerians ==
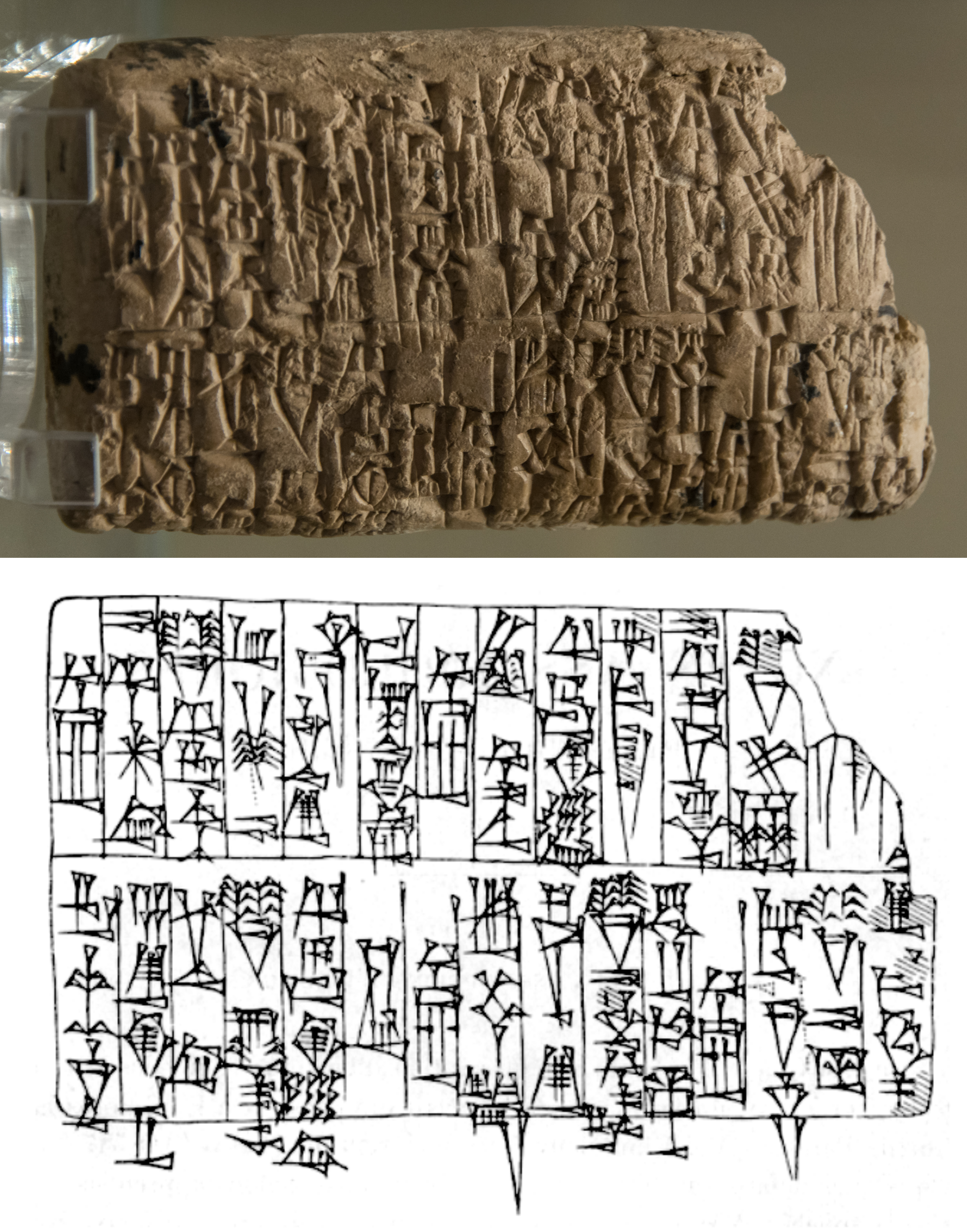
Account of the victories of Rimush, ruler of the Akkadian Empire, over Abalgamash, king of Marhashi. In his inscriptions, Rimush mentioned the army led by Abalgamash included troops from Meluhha. Louvre Museum AO5476.

According to some accounts of the Akkadian king Rimush, he fought against the troops of Meluhha, in the area of Elam:

"Rimuš, the king of the world, in battle over Abalgamash, king of Parahshum, was victorious. And Zahara and Elam and Gupin and Meluḫḫa within Paraḫšum assembled for battle, but he (Rimush) was victorious and struck down 16,212 men and took 4,216 captives. Further, he captured Ehmahsini, King of Elam, and all the nobles of Elam. Further he captured Sidaga'u the general of Paraḫšum and Sargapi, general of Zahara, in between the cities of Awan and Susa, by the "Middle River". Further a burial mound at the site of the town he heaped up over them. Furthermore, the foundations of Paraḫšum from the country of Elam he tore out, and so Rimuš, king of the world, rules Elam, (as) the god Enlil had shown..."

— Inscription of Rimush

Gudea too, in one of his inscriptions, mentioned his victory over the territories of Magan, Meluhha, Elam and Amurru.

== Identification with the Indus Valley ==
Most scholars suggest that Meluhha was the Sumerian name for the Indus Valley Civilisation. Finnish scholars Asko and Simo Parpola identify Meluhha (earlier variant Me-lah-ha) from earlier Sumerian documents with Dravidian mel akam "high abode" or "high country". Many items of trade such as wood, minerals, and gemstones were indeed extracted from the hilly regions near the Indus settlements. They further claim that Meluhha is the origin of the Sanskrit word mleccha, meaning "foreigner or person who's outside of the Vedic realm".

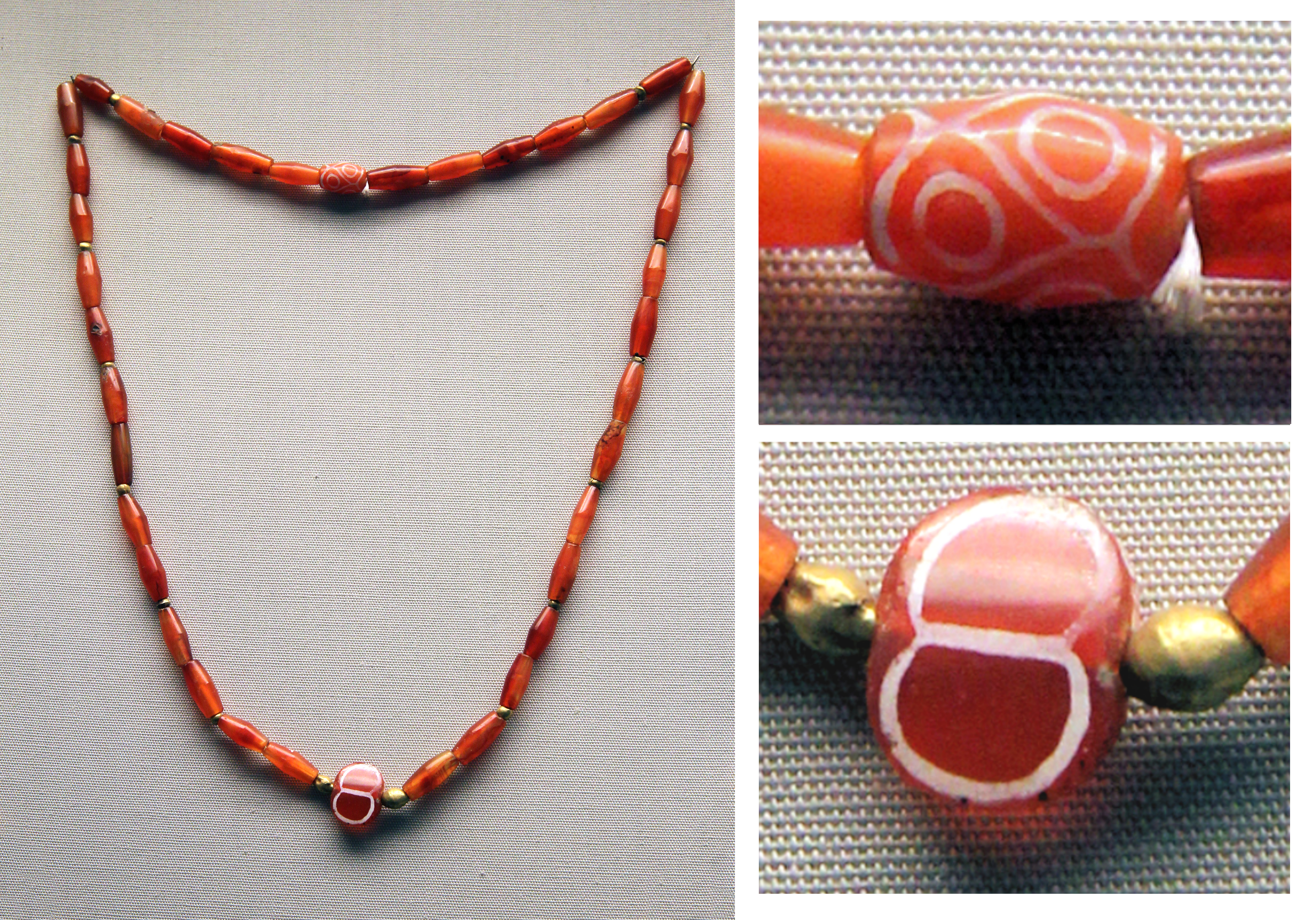
The etched carnelian beads in this necklace from the Royal Cemetery of Ur dating to the First Dynasty of Ur (2600-2500 BCE) were probably imported from the Indus Valley.

Early texts, such as the Rimush inscription describing combat against Meluhha troops in the area of Elam circa 2200 BC, seem to indicate that Meluhha is to the east, suggesting either the Indus valley or India. However, much later texts, such as the Rassam cylinder documenting the military exploits of King Assurbanipal of Assyria (668–627 BC), long after the Indus Valley civilization had ceased to exist, seem to imply that Meluhha is to be found in Africa, in the area of Egypt.

There is sufficient archaeological evidence for the trade between Mesopotamia and the Indian subcontinent. Impressions of clay seals from the Indus Valley city of Harappa were evidently used to seal bundles of merchandise, as clay seal impressions with cord or sack marks on the reverse side testify. A number of these Harrapan seals have been found at Ur and other Mesopotamian sites.

The Persian-Gulf style of circular stamped rather than rolled seals, also known from Dilmun, that appear at Lothal in Gujarat, India, and Failaka Island (Kuwait), as well as in Mesopotamia, are convincing corroboration of the long-distance sea trade network, which G.L. Possehl has called a "Middle Asian Interaction Sphere". What the commerce consisted of is less sure: timber and precious woods, ivory, lapis lazuli, gold, and luxury goods such as carnelian and glazed stone beads, pearls from the Persian Gulf, and shell and bone inlays, were among the goods sent to Mesopotamia in exchange for silver, tin, woolen textiles, perhaps oil and grains and other foods. Copper ingots, certainly, bitumen, which occurred naturally in Mesopotamia, may have been exchanged for cotton textiles and chickens, major products of the Indus region that are not native to Mesopotamia—all these have been instanced.

== "Meluhha" as Meroe, in the 14th–2nd centuries BCE ==
Meluhha appears in EL-AMARNA letters, as a place at Kush/Nubia, near Egypt (EA70, EA95, EA108, EA112, EA117, EA132, EA133).

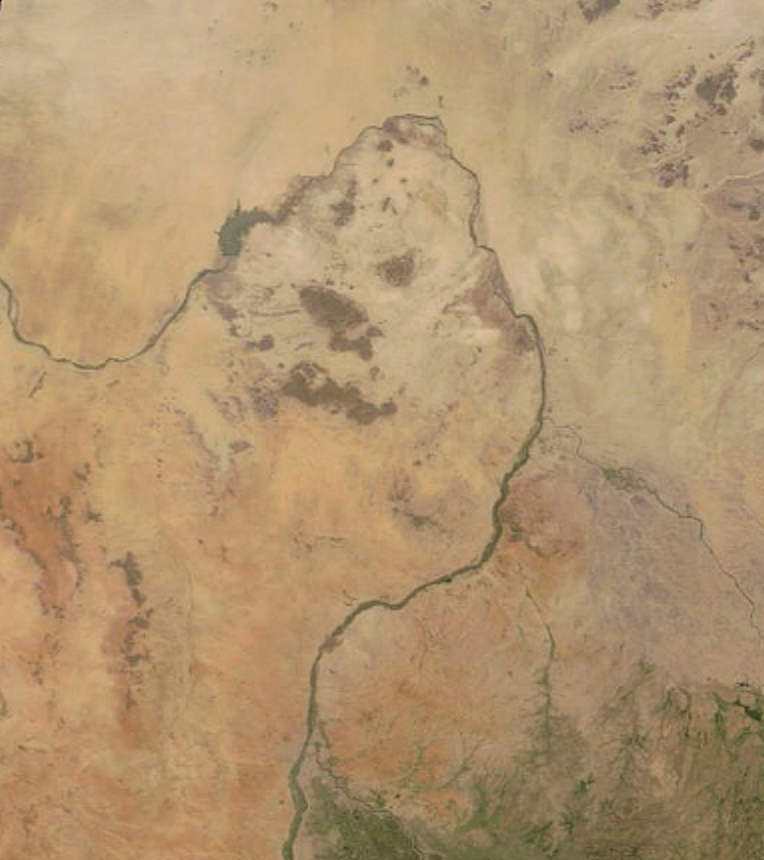
A modern satellite view of the region of Meroe.

In the Assyrian and Hellenistic eras, cuneiform texts continued to use (or revive) old place names, giving a perhaps artificial sense of continuity between contemporary events and events of the distant past. For example, Media is referred to as "the land of the Gutians", a people who had been prominent around 2000 BC.

Meluhha also appears in these texts, in contexts suggesting that "Meluhha" and "Magan" were kingdoms adjacent to Egypt. In the Rassam cylinder, Ashurbanipal writes about his first march against Egypt: "In my first campaign I marched against Magan and Meluhha, and Taharqa, king of Musur (Egypt) and Kûsu ("Kingdom of Kush", ie Nubia), whom Esarhaddon, king of Assyria, the father who begot me, had defeated, and whose land he brought under his sway." In this context, "Magan" has been interpreted as "Muṣur" (ancient name of Egypt) and "Meluhha" as "Meroe" (capital of Nubia).

Meluhha (𒈨𒈛𒄩𒆠) as mentioned by Ashurbanipal in the Rassam cylinder in 643 BCE, as a territory associated with Egypt, probably Meroe (column 1 line 52)

In the Hellenistic period, the term was used archaically to refer to Ptolemaic Egypt, as in an account of a festival celebrating the conclusion of the Sixth Syrian War, or in reference to the campaigns of Antiochus IV Epiphanes in Egypt ("Antiochus the King marched triumphantly through the cities of Meluhha").

These references do not necessarily mean that early references to Meluhha also referred to Egypt. Direct contacts between Sumer and the Indus Valley had ceased even during the Mature Harappan phase when Oman and Bahrain (Magan and Dilmun) became intermediaries. After the sack of Ur by the Elamites and subsequent invasions in Sumer, its trade and contacts shifted west and Meluhha passed almost into mythological memory. The resurfacing of the name could simply reflect cultural memory of a rich and distant land, its use in records of Achaemenid and Seleucid military expeditions serving to aggrandize those kings. This kind of re-attribution of archaic geographical terms was a regular occurrence during the 1st millennium BCE.

== Rulers ==
- (..)ibra (between 2300 BC – 2200 BC), possibly contemporary to Naram-Sin of Akkad.

== See also ==
- Ancient Greece–Ancient India relations
- Buddhism and the Roman world
- Dilmun
- Economic history of India
- Indus–Mesopotamia relations
- Indo-Roman trade relations
- Indian maritime history
- Magan (civilization)
- Names for India
