= Buddhism and the Roman world =

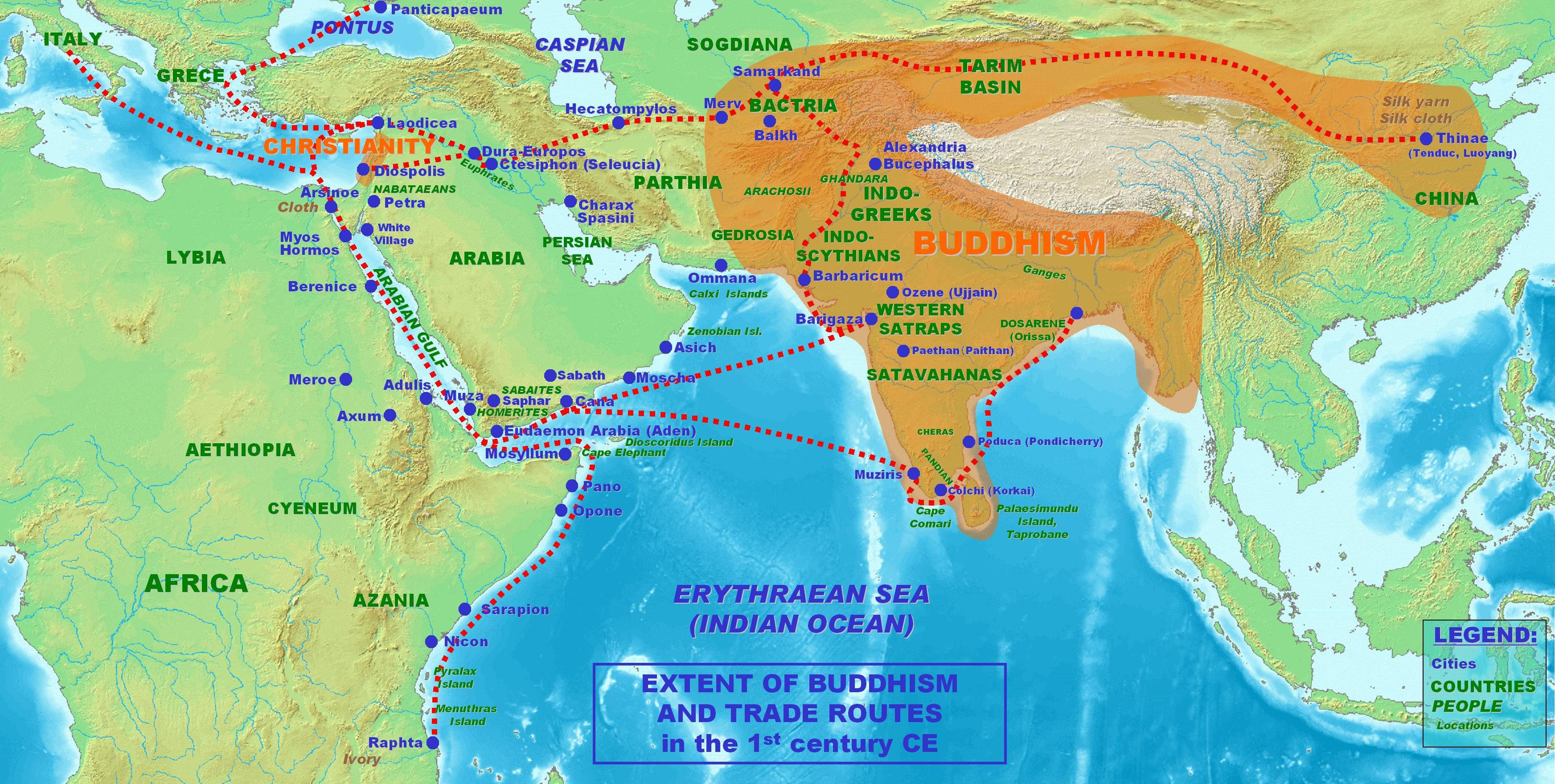
Extent of Buddhism and trade routes in the 1st century AD.

Several instances of interaction between Buddhism and the Roman world are documented by Classical and early Christian writers. Textual sources in the Tamil language, moreover, suggest the presence of Buddhism among some Roman citizens in the 2nd century AD.

== Pandion embassy ==
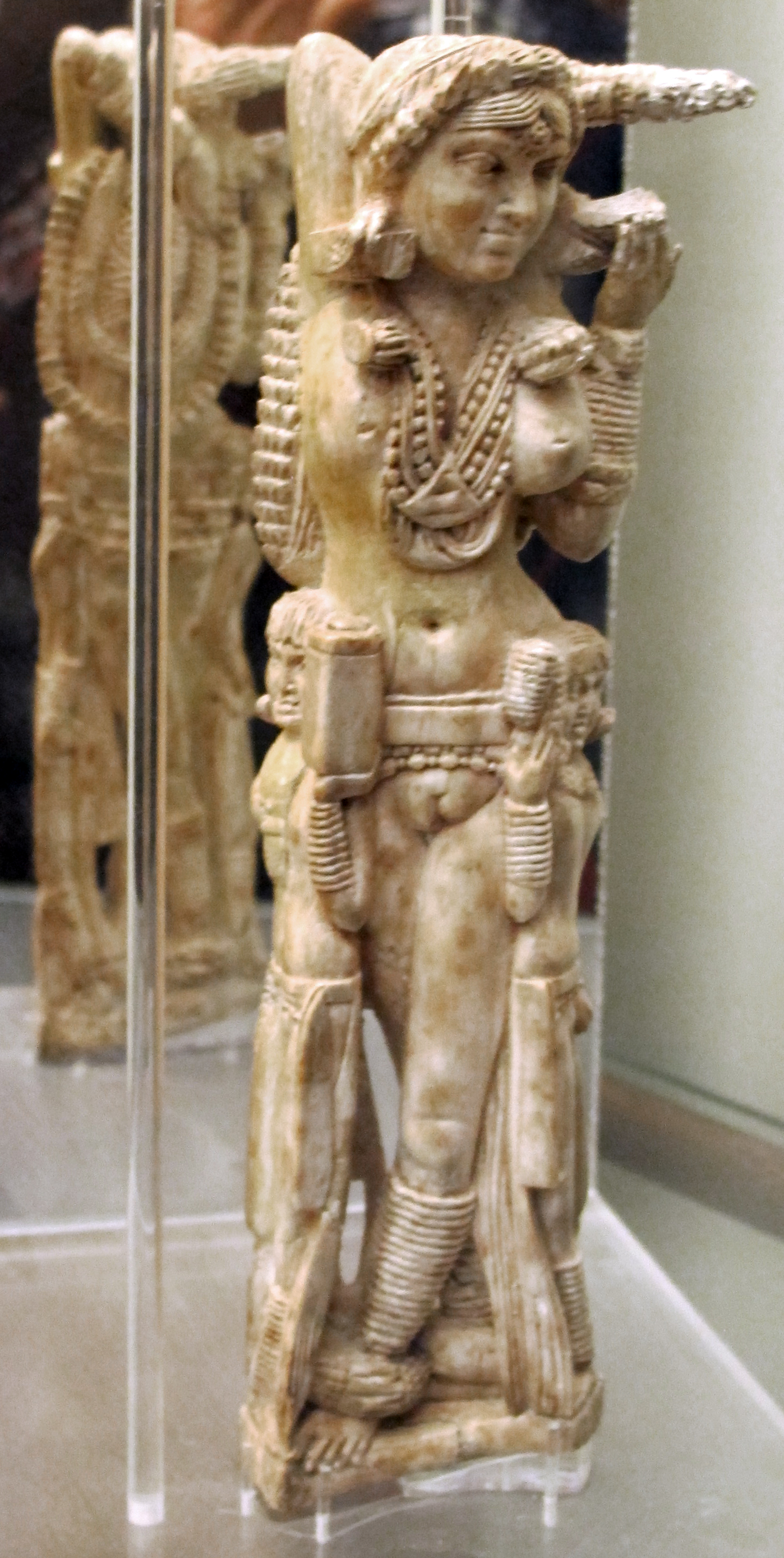
The Pompeii Lakshmi ivory statuette, found in 1938 in the ruins of Pompeii (destroyed in 79 CE), is thought to have originated in Bhokardan, Satavahana Empire. It testifies to the intensity of Indo-Roman trade relations at the time.

Roman historical accounts describe an embassy sent by the "Indian king Porus" (perhaps Pandion, Pandya, or Pandita) to Caesar Augustus sometime between 22 BC and 13 AD. The embassy was travelling with a diplomatic letter on a skin in Greek, and one of its members was a sramana who burned himself alive in Athens to demonstrate his faith. The event made a sensation and was described by Nicolaus of Damascus, who met the embassy at Antioch (near present day Antakya in Turkey) and related by Strabo (XV, 1,73) and Dio Cassius (liv, 9). A tomb was made to the sramana, still visible in the time of Plutarch, which bore the mention:

"ΖΑΡΜΑΝΟΧΗΓΑΣ ΙΝΔΟΣ ΑΠΟ ΒΑΡΓΟΣΗΣ"
("Zarmanochegas from Barygaza in India")

Strabo also states that Nicolaus of Damascus in giving the details of his tomb inscription specified his name was "Zarmanochegas" and he "immortalized himself according to the custom of his country." Cassius Dio (Hist 54.9) and Plutarch cite the same story Charles Eliot in his Hinduism and Buddhism: An Historical Sketch (1921) considers that the name Zarmanochegas "perhaps contains the two words Sramana and Acarya." HL Jones' translation of the inscription as mentioned by Strabo reads it as "The Sramana master, an Indian, a native of Bargosa, having immortalized himself according to the custom of his country, lies here." These accounts at least indicate that Indian religious men (Sramanas, to which the Buddhists belonged, as opposed to Hindu Brahmanas) were circulating in the Levant during the time of Jesus.

== Buddhism in the Hellenic era ==
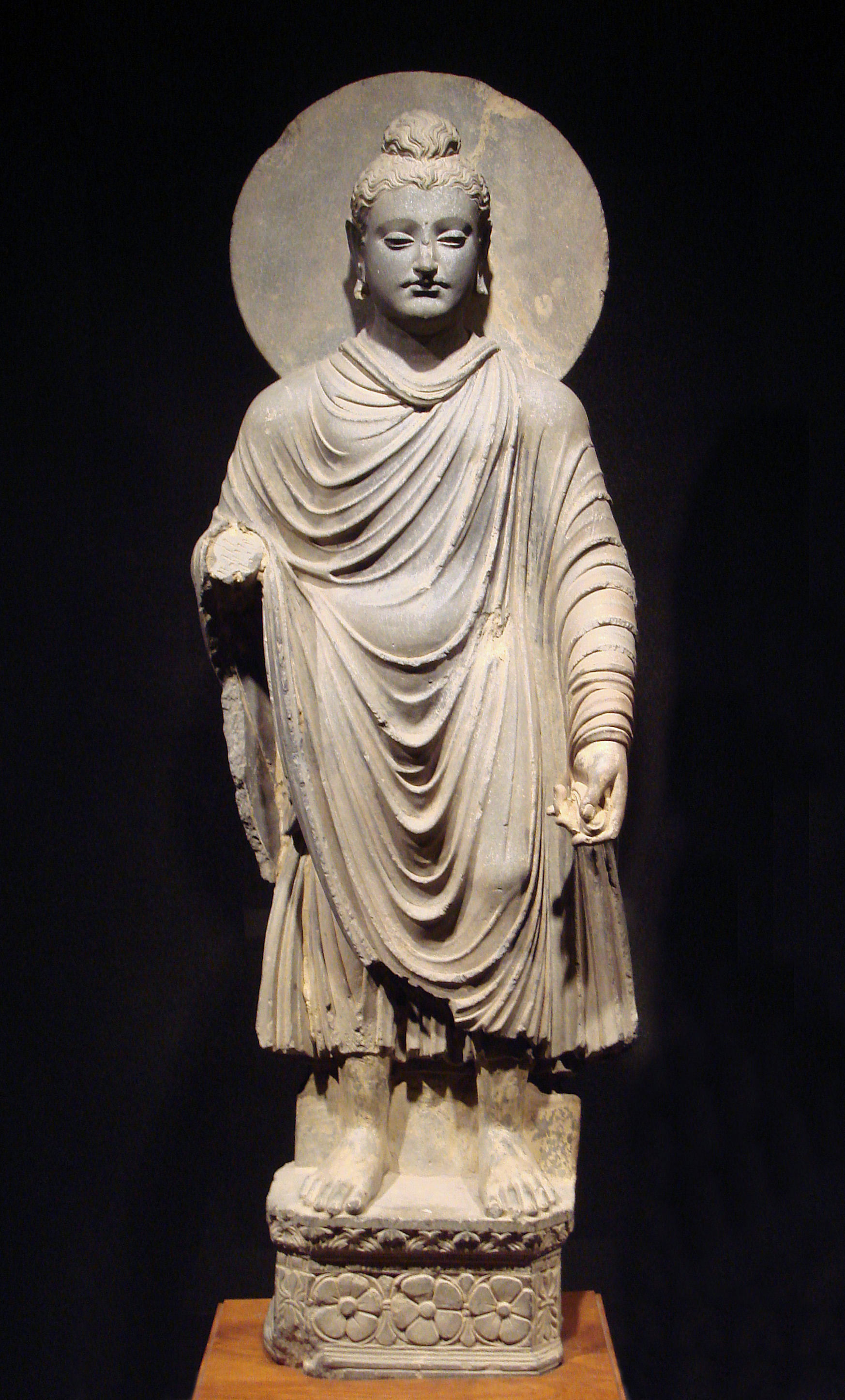
From the time of Jesus or soon after: a statue of Siddartha Gautama preaching, in the Greco-Buddhist style of Gandhara, present-day Pakistan

By the time of Jesus, the teachings of the Buddha had already spread through much of India and penetrated into Sri Lanka, Central Asia and China.

Will Durant, noting that the Emperor Ashoka sent missionaries, not only to elsewhere in India and to Sri Lanka, but to Syria, Egypt and Greece, speculated in the 1930s that they may have helped prepare the ground for Christian teaching.

== Mauryan proselytizing ==
Ashoka ascended the throne of the Mauryan Empire around 270 BC. After his conversion to Buddhism he dispatched missionaries to the four points of the compass. Archeological finds indicate these missions had been "favorably received" in lands to the West.

Ptolemy II Philadelphus, one of the monarchs Ashoka mentions in his edicts, is recorded by Pliny the Elder as having sent an ambassador named Dionysius to the Mauryan court at Pataliputra: "India has been treated of by several other Greek writers who resided at the courts of Indian kings, such, for instance, as Megasthenes, and by Dionysius, who was sent thither by Philadelphus, expressly for the purpose: all of whom have enlarged upon the power and vast resources of these nations."

Records from Alexandria, long a crossroads of commerce and ideas, indicate that itinerant monks from the Indian subcontinent may have influenced philosophical currents of the time. Roman accounts centuries later speak of monks traveling to the Middle East, and there is mention of an embassy sent by the Indian king Pandion, or Porus (possibly Pandya), to Caesar Augustus around 13 AD (see Pandion Embassy section above).

== Expansion of Buddhist culture westward ==
Meanwhile, the Buddha's teachings had spread north-west, into Parthian territory. Buddhist stupa remains have been identified as distant as the Silk Road city of Merv. Soviet archeological teams in Giaur Kala, near Merv, have uncovered a Buddhist monastery, complete with huge buddharupa. Parthian nobles such as An Shih Kao are known to have adopted Buddhism and were among those responsible for its further spread towards Han China.

== Western knowledge of Buddhism ==
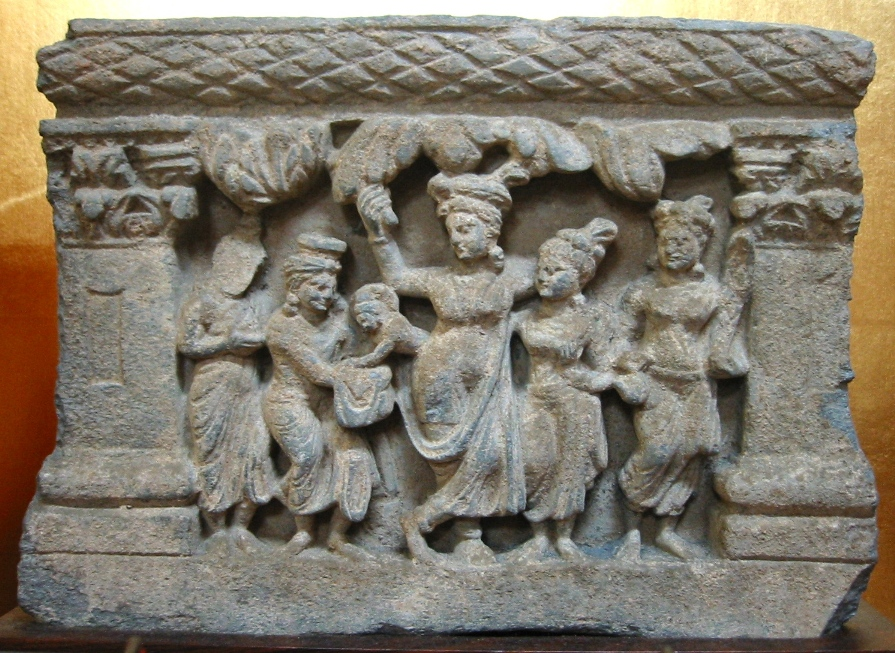
The birth of Siddhartha Gautama, Gandhara, 2nd–3rd century AD.

Some knowledge of Buddhism existed quite early in the West. In the 2nd century AD Clement of Alexandria wrote about the Buddha:

εἰσὶ δὲ τῶν Ἰνδῶν οἱ τοῖς Βούττα πειθόμενοι παραγγέλμασιν. ὃν δι’ ὑπερβολὴν σεμνότητος ὡς θεὸν τετιμήκασι. [Among the Indians are those philosophers also who follow the precepts of Boutta, whom they honour as a god on account of his extraordinary sanctity.]

— Clement of Alexandria, Stromata (Miscellanies), Book I, Chapter XV

He also recognized Bactrian Buddhists (Sramanas) and Indian Gymnosophists for their influence on Greek thought:

"Thus philosophy, a thing of the highest utility, flourished in antiquity among the barbarians, shedding its light over the nations. And afterwards it came to Greece. First in its ranks were the prophets of the Egyptians; and the Chaldeans among the Assyrians; and the Druids among the Gauls; and the Sramanas among the Bactrians ("Σαρμαναίοι Βάκτρων"); and the philosophers of the Celts; and the Magi of the Persians, who foretold the Saviour's birth, and came into the land of Judaea guided by a star. The Indian gymnosophists are also in the number, and the other barbarian philosophers. And of these there are two classes, some of them called Sramanas ("Σαρμάναι"), and others Brahmins ("Βραχμάναι")."

— Clement of Alexandria, Stromata (Miscellanies)

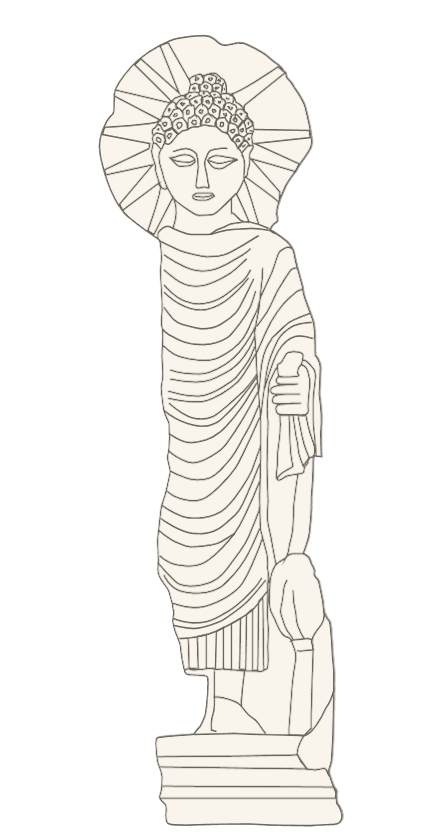
The Berenike Buddha, discovered in Berenice, Egypt, in 2022.

The story of the birth of the Buddha was also known: a fragment of Archelaos of Carrha (278 AD) mentions the Buddha's virgin-birth, and Saint Jerome (4th century) mentions the birth of the Buddha, who he says "was born from the side of a virgin". Queen Maya came to bear the Buddha after receiving a prophetic dream in which she foresaw the descent of the Bodhisattva (Buddha-to-be) from the Tuṣita heaven into her womb. This story has some parallels with the story of Jesus being conceived in connection with the visitation of the Holy Spirit to the Virgin Mary.

In Berenice, Egypt, in March 2022 an American-Polish archaeological mission excavating the main early Roman period temple dedicated to the Goddess Isis uncovered in the forecourt of the temple a marble statue of a Buddha, the Berenike Buddha, suggesting the presence of Buddhist merchants from India in Egypt at that time.

The latest impact upon Christian and Greek literature is the Christianized version of the legend of the life of the Buddha found in the Buddhist texts of the 3rd century CE and the epic Barlaam and Josaphat. The latter is traditionally attributed to Saint John of Damascus (d.c.750 CE), but it seems that he took it from the Arabic Kitab Bilawhar wa Yudasaf, which in its turn had also been taken from India via the Manichaeans.

== Buddhism and Gnosticism ==
Early 3rd century–4th century Christian writers such as Hippolytus and Epiphanius write about a Scythianus, who visited India around 50 AD from where he brought "the doctrine of the Two Principles". According to Cyril of Jerusalem, Scythianus' pupil Terebinthus presented himself as a "Buddha" ("He called himself Buddas"). Terebinthus went to Palestine and Judaea ("becoming known and condemned"), and ultimately settled in Babylon, where he transmitted his teachings to Mani, thereby creating the foundation of Manichaeism:

"But Terebinthus, his disciple in this wicked error, inherited his money and books and heresy, and came to Palestine, and becoming known and condemned in Judæa he resolved to pass into Persia: but lest he should be recognised there also by his name he changed it and called himself Buddas."

— Cyril of Jerusalem, "Catechetical lecture 6"

== Buddhism and Pyrrhonism ==
Because of the high degree of similarity between Madhyamaka and Pyrrhonism, particularly the surviving works of Sextus Empiricus, Thomas McEvilley and Matthew Neale suspect that Nāgārjuna was influenced by Greek Pyrrhonist texts imported into India during the era of Roman trade with India.

According to legend, Nagarjuna said he was influenced by books inaccessible to other people. He was approached by Nāgas (semi-divine serpents) in human form. They invited him to their kingdom to see some texts they thought would be of great interest to him. Nagarjuna studied those texts and brought them back to India. According to Matthew Neale, "Nāgārjuna was a skillful diplomat concealing novel doctrines in acceptably Buddhist discourse... to conceal their doctrines' derivation from foreign wisdom traditions."

== See also ==
- Index of Buddhism-related articles
- Ancient Greece–Ancient India relations
- Buddhism and Christianity
- Economic history of India
- Historic GDP of India (1–1947 CE)
- Greco-Buddhism
- Indus–Mesopotamia relations
- Indian maritime history
- Meluhha trade with Sumer
- Roman trade with India
- Secular Buddhism
- Sino-Roman relations
