= Indo-Roman relations =

Relations

Roman maritime trade in India and Scythia according to the Periplus Maris Erythraei, 1st century AD.

The first documented relations between Ancient India and Ancient Rome occurred during the reign of Augustus (27 BC – AD 14), the first Roman Emperor.

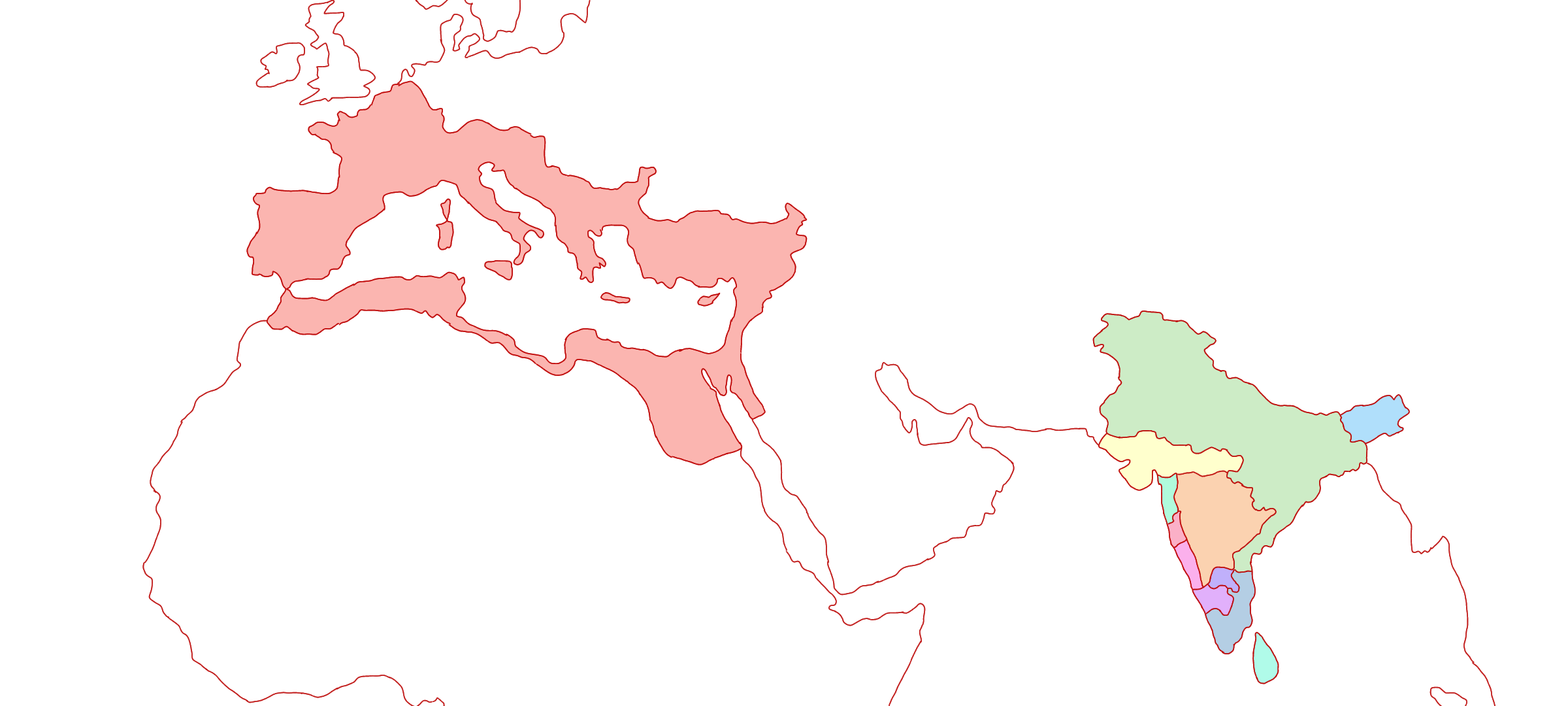
Roman Empire and the Indian subcontinent in 394 CE. The Green representing the Gupta Empire and Red for Roman Empire.

The presence of Europeans, including Romans, in the region known at the time as "India" (modern South Asia, including India, Bangladesh, Pakistan and eastern-Afghanistan), during the period of the Roman Empire, is poorly documented. Before the conquests of Alexander, there are no surviving accounts by contemporaries or near-contemporaries of contact between Europe and the South Asia, so modern understanding depends on more abundant literary, numismatic, and archaeological evidence, mainly relating to the trade between them. The Romans were referred as रोमक Romaka in Sanskrit, while the Romans called the Indians in Latin Indī.

== Early contacts ==
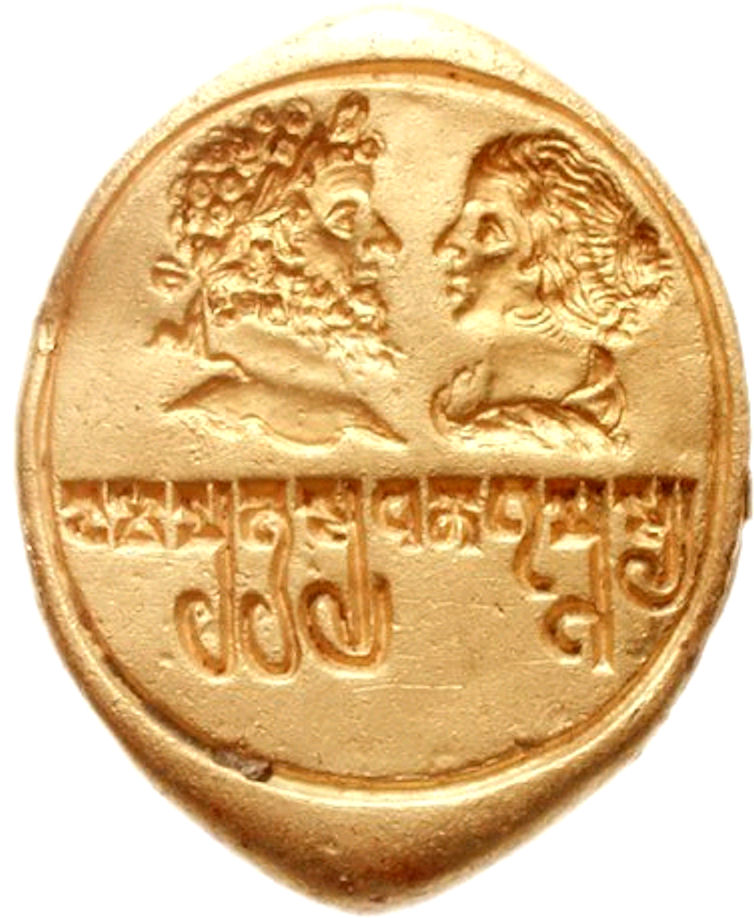
Kushan ring with portraits of Septimius Severus and Julia Domna, a testimony to Indo-Roman relations.

Indo-Roman relations were built on trade. Roman trade in India began with overland caravans and later by direct maritime trade following the conquest of Egypt by Augustus in 30 BC.

According to Strabo (II.5.12), not long after Augustus took control of Egypt, while Gallus was Prefect of Egypt (26–24 BC), up to 120 ships were setting sail every year from Myos Hormos to modern-day India:

"At any rate, when Gallus was prefect of Egypt, I accompanied him and ascended the Nile as far as Syene and the frontiers of Ethiopia, and I learned that as many as one hundred and twenty vessels were sailing from Myos Hormos to India, whereas formerly, under the Ptolemies, only a very few ventured to undertake the voyage and to carry on traffic in Indian merchandise."

— Strabo II.5.12.

Augustus maintained the Ptolemaic Red Sea ports and the picket service from the Red Sea to the Nile, whence goods could be carried downstream to the ports of Pelusium and Alexandria. He also replaced the Ptolemaic patrol fleet on the Red Sea to keep piracy in check. He received embassies from Indian kings in 26 and 20 BC and, although little specific is known about them, as Carey puts it: "These missions were certainly intended for something more than an exchange of empty compliments."

By the time of Augustus, if not before, a sea-captain named Hippalus had "discovered" (or, rather, brought news to the West of) the relatively safe and punctual contact over the open sea to India by leaving from Aden on the summer monsoon and returning on the anti-trade winds of winter. This would be made safer and more convenient by the Roman sack of Aden in a naval raid c. 1 BC.

Cassius Dio (d. sometime after AD 229 ) in his Hist. Rom. 54.9 wrote:

Many embassies came to him (Augustus), and the Indians having previously proclaimed a treaty of alliance, concluded it now with the presentation, among other gifts, of tigers, animals which the Romans, and, if I mistake not, the Greeks as well, saw for the first time. . . .

The overland caravans would gain more convenient access into India after the expansion of the Kushans into northern India during the 1st century AD, and then down the Ganges Valley in the early 2nd century.

"From those land routes at least in the time of Augustus several embassies reached Rome. At least four such embassies are mentioned in the Latin literature, namely 1) the embassy from Puru country (the territory between the Jhelum and Beas) took with it to Rome serpents, monals, tigers and a letter written in Greek language, 2) the embassy from Broach was accompanied by a Buddhist monk named Germanos, 3) an embassy from the Chera country. It was reported in Rome that at Muziris (near Cranganore) was built a temple in honour of Augustus and 4) an embassy from the Paṇḍya country (Pandya Kingdom) brought with it precious stones, pearls and an elephant. We know that in the time of Augustus commercial relations between India and Rome grew but in this the balance of trade was in favour of India from the very beginning and as a result of this Roman gold poured into the country."

== The Periplus ==
The Periplus of the Erythraean Sea, written by an anonymous sea-captain in Greek, can now be confidently dated to between 40 and 70 and, probably, between AD 40 and 50.

The author of the Periplus lists ports from Barbarikon at the mouth of the Indus in the west near modern Karachi, right around the southern tip of the Indian peninsula and north as far as the mouth of the Ganges near modern Kolkata (Calcutta). In contrast to the wealth of information on some of the west coast ports, the author gives no political information on the ports up the east coast of India, perhaps indicating that he had not personally visited them. In fact the text seems to imply that western vessels normally did not travel beyond the tip of the Indian peninsula, probably leaving onward trade to local boats as the passage between India and the northern tip of Palaisimundu or Taprobanê (Sri Lanka) was very shallow for trans-oceanic vessels, while the route around the island was long and may have forced skippers to pass another season in the region before the winds were right for the return to Egypt.

== Pliny's accounts ==
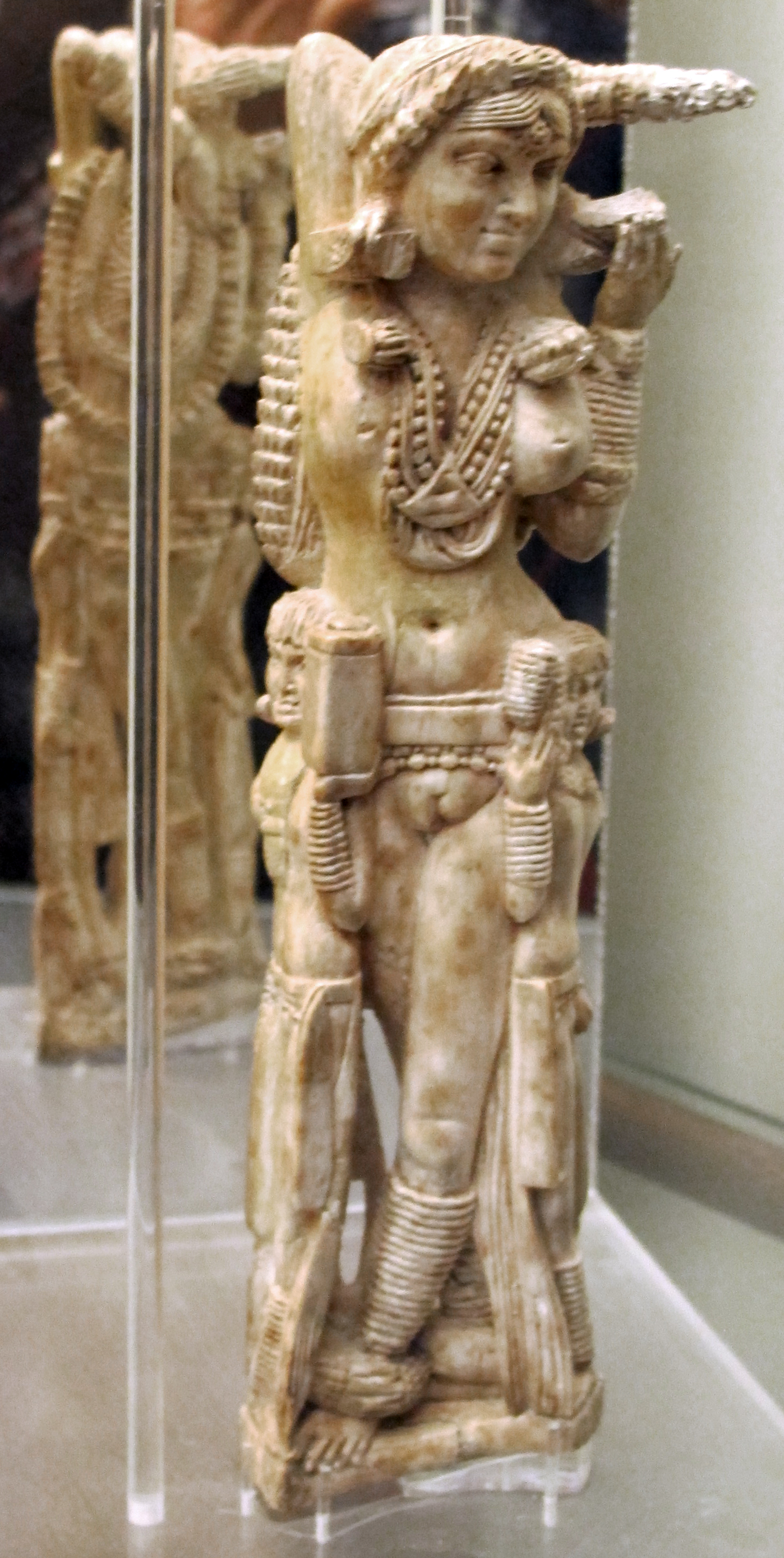
Indian art also found its way into Italy: in 1938 the Pompeii Lakshmi was found in the ruins of Pompeii (destroyed in an eruption of Mount Vesuvius in AD 79 ).

Gaius Plinius Secundus (AD 23–79), generally known as Pliny the Elder, writing c. AD 77, left probably the most important account of India and its trade with Rome that has survived in Classical literature. He gives quite a lot of detail about India, albeit not all accurate, but his observations do more than just outline the bare bones of history, and help give us some picture of how intimately Indian culture and trade was becoming known:

"Coral is as highly valued among the Indians as Indian pearls. It is also found in the Red Sea, but there it is darker in colour. The most prized is found in the Gallic Gulf around the Stoechades Islands, in the Sicilian Gulf around the Aeolian Islands, and around Drepanum. . . . Coral-berries are no less valued by Indian men than specimen Indian pearls by Roman ladies. Indian soothsayers and seers believe that coral is potent as a charm for warding off dangers. Accordingly they delight in its beauty and religious power. Before this became known, the Gauls used to decorate their swords, shields and helmets with coral. Now it is very scarce because of the price it commands, and is rarely seen in its natural habitat." Pliny. Natural History (AD 77) (XXXII, chaps. 21, 23).

Although his estimate of the value of Rome's trade to the East at some 100 million sesterces annually (Pliny, NH, VI, 26, 6 & NH, XII, 41, 2) has often been thought to be an exaggeration but, if it is interpreted as referring to the total value of the trade rather than as coinage, it becomes quite believable:

"For example, just one documented consignment from Muziris (Chera kingdom, modern-day South India) to Alexandria consisted of 700-1,700 pounds of nard (an aromatic balsam), over 4,700 pounds of ivory and almost 790 pounds of textiles. This has been calculated as worth a total value of 131 talents, enough to purchase 2,400 acres of the best farmland in Egypt. When it is borne in mind that an average Roman cargo ship would have held about 150 such consignments, Pliny's figure becomes entirely plausible. With such staggering profits it is little wonder that the Roman government in Egypt encouraged – and profited by! – the trade: a 25 per cent tax on all goods from India was levied by the Romans at the Red Sea port of Leuce Come."

== Trajan ==
After the Roman Emperor Trajan defeated the Dacians and annexed the Nabataean Arabs centered in Petra c. AD 105, he returned to Rome where:

"...ever so many embassies came to him from various barbarians, including the Sindi [people of the Indus Valley]. And he gave spectacles on one hundred and twenty-three days, in the course of which some eleven thousand animals, both wild and tame, were slain, and ten thousand gladiators fought."

Trajan later defeated Parthia and, sailing down the Tigris River (115–16), reached the northern shores of the Persian Gulf. "Roman troops had beaten the might of Parthia from the field and had reached the Persian Gulf; and their victorious Imperator, Trajan, had dreamed of repeating Alexander's march to the northwestern subcontinent, only to acquiesce in giving up the project on account of his age."

== Later references ==
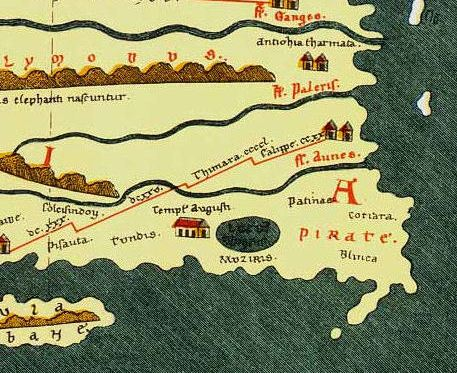
Muziris, near the southern tip of India, in the Peutinger Table.

The Peutinger Table, a medieval copy of a 4th or early 5th century map of the world, shows a "Temple to Augustus" at Muziris, one of the main ports for trade to the Roman Empire on the southwest coast of India. This and evidence of agreements for loans between agents, one of whom most likely lived in Muziris, and a rather oblique reference in the Periplus, all seem to point to a settlement of Roman subjects living in the region.

Embassies are recorded as arriving from the "Indians of the East" at the court of Constantine the Great (r. 306–337):

"Ambassadors from the Indians of the East brought presents . . . . which they presented to the king (Constantine the Great) as an acknowledgment that his sovereignty extended to their ocean. They told him, too, how Princes of India had dedicated pictures and statues in his honour in token that they had recognised him as their autocrat and king." Eusebius of Caesarea (fl. early 4th century) Vita Constantini IV. 50.

More embassies are mentioned from "the Indian nations" in AD 361:

"Embassies from all quarters flocked to him (the Emperor Julian in 361 A.D.), the Indian nations vying with emulous zeal in sending their foremost men with presents, as far as from the Divi (Maldives) and the Serendivi (Ceylonese) [sic]." Ammianus Marcellinus. History XXII.vii.10.

Finally, Johannes Malala or John Malalas (fl. mid-6th century), p. 477, records that, in AD 530, "an ambassador of the Indians was sent to Constantinople."

== Archaeological record ==
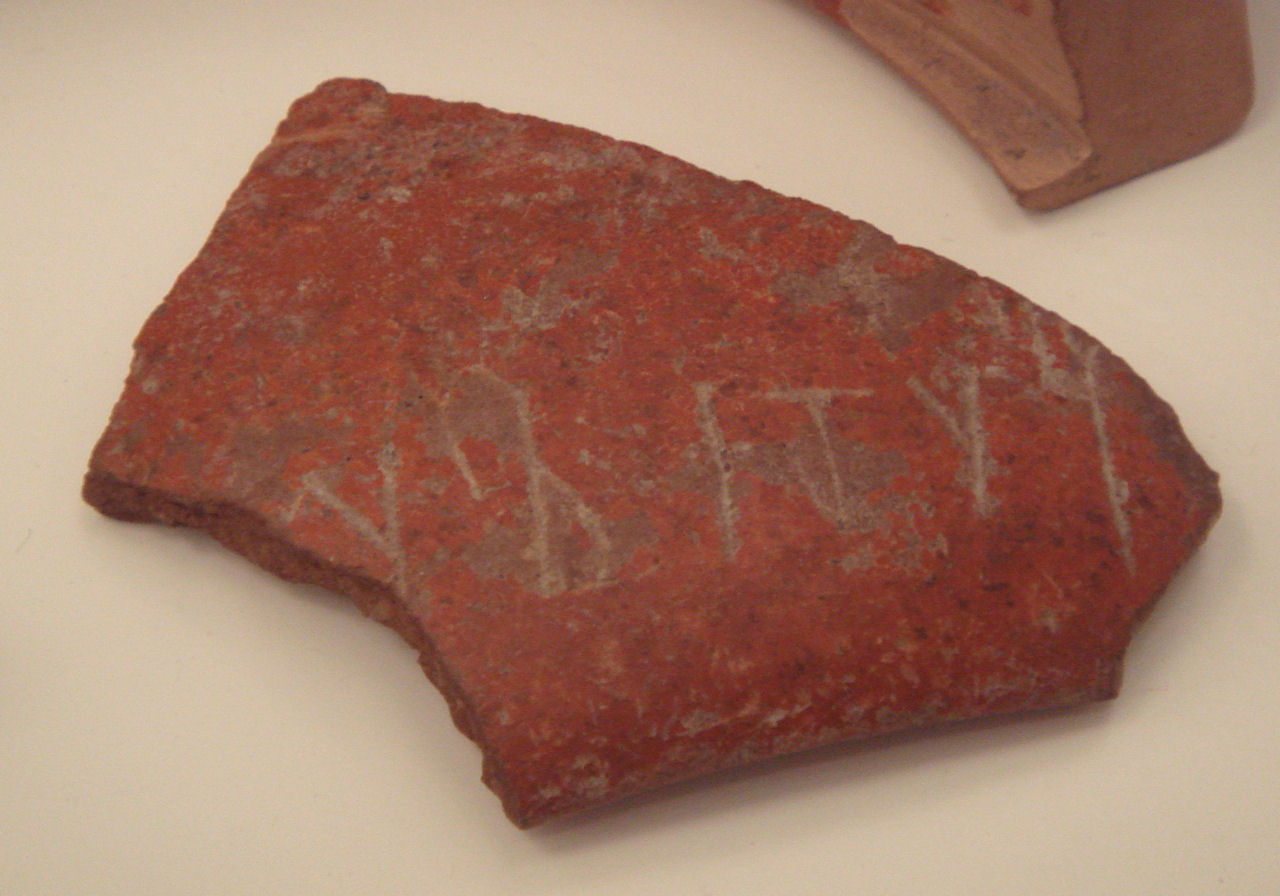
Roman piece of pottery from Arezzo in Italy, found at Veerampattinam, Arikamedu, Puducherry, India(1st century AD).

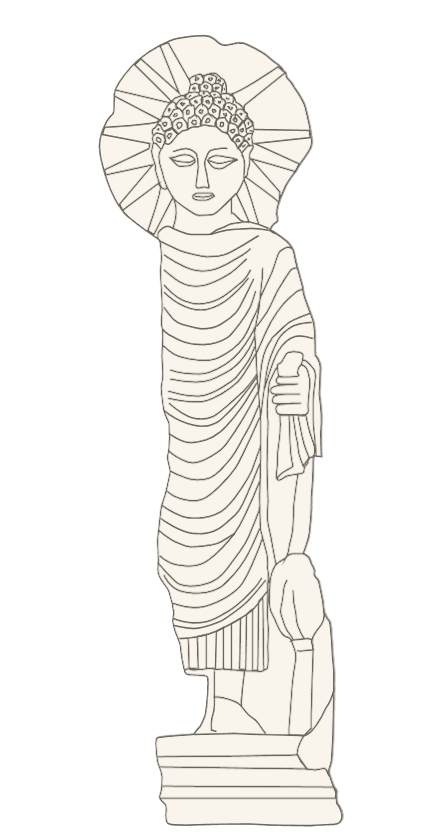
The Berenike Buddha, discovered in Berenice, Egypt.

The best archeological record of Roman presence can be found in southern India, specifically at Arikamedu.

Arikamedu was a Tamil fishing village which was formerly a major Chola port dedicated to bead making and trading with Roman traders. It flourished for centuries until the Romans left in the 5th century AD.

Various Roman artifacts, such as a large number of amphorae bearing the mark of Roman potter schools VIBII, CAMURI and ITTA, have been found at the site, supporting the view on a huge ancient trade between Rome and the ancient Tamil country, which today include Tamil Nadu, Kerala and regions of Sri Lanka.

Another place full of archeological records is Muziris, in the Kerala region. Muziris was a major centre of trade in Tamilakkam between the Chera Empire and the Roman Empire. Large hoards of coins and innumerable shards of amphorae found in the town of Pattanam have elicited recent archeological interest in finding a probable location of this port city.

A statue of the Buddha, the Berenike Buddha, made locally and dated to the 2nd century AD, was discovered in the Egyptian harbour of Berenike.

== Numismatic record ==
Numerous hoards of Roman gold coins from the time of Augustus and emperors of the 1st and 2nd centuries AD have been from southern India. Attention may be drawn to the large number of Roman aurei and denarii of Augustus to Nero spanning approximately 120 years, found all along the route from about Mangalore through the Muziris area and around the southern tip of India to the south eastern Indian ports.

Under the rule of Augustus, (27 BCE–AD 14) the silver content of the denarius fell to 3.9 grams. It remained at nearly this weight until the time of Nero (AD 37–68). This would also indicate that the land route from the West coast to the East coast via the Palghat pass in the Western Ghats was much more popular than the risky or circuitous sea route rounding the Cape or Sri Lanka.

== See also ==
- Ancient Greece–Ancient India relations
- Ancient maritime history
- Economic history of India
- Historic GDP of India (AD 1-1947)
- Indian Ocean trade
- Indo-Mediterranean
- Indo-Roman trade relations
- India–Italy relations
- Greece–India relations
- Indus–Mesopotamia relations
- Indian maritime history
- Meluhha trade with Sumer
- Periplus of the Erythraean Sea
- Silk Road
