= Indo-Roman trade relations =

Trade between the Indian subcontinent and the Roman Empire

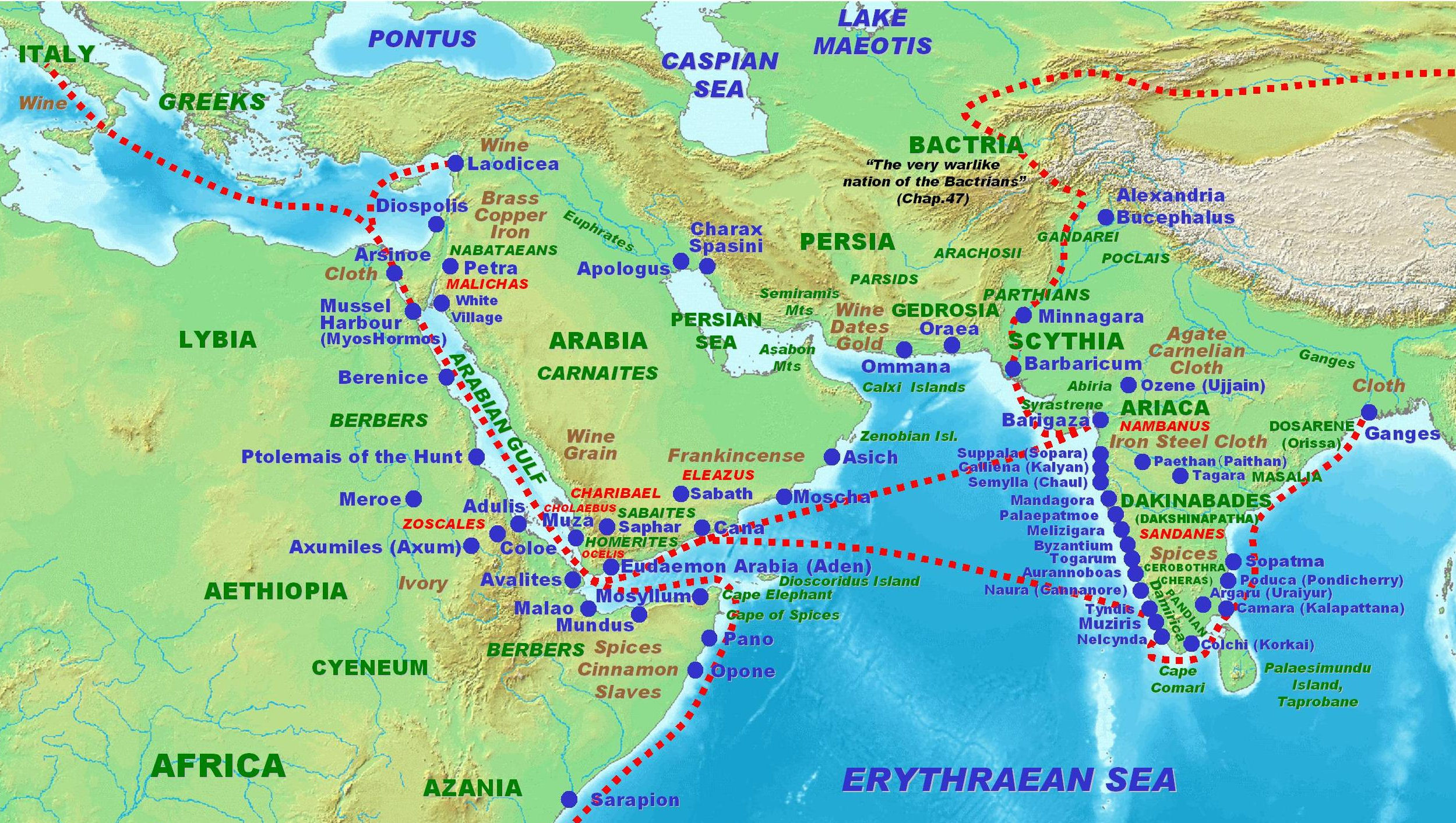
Roman trade in the subcontinent according to the Periplus Maris Erythraei 1st century CE

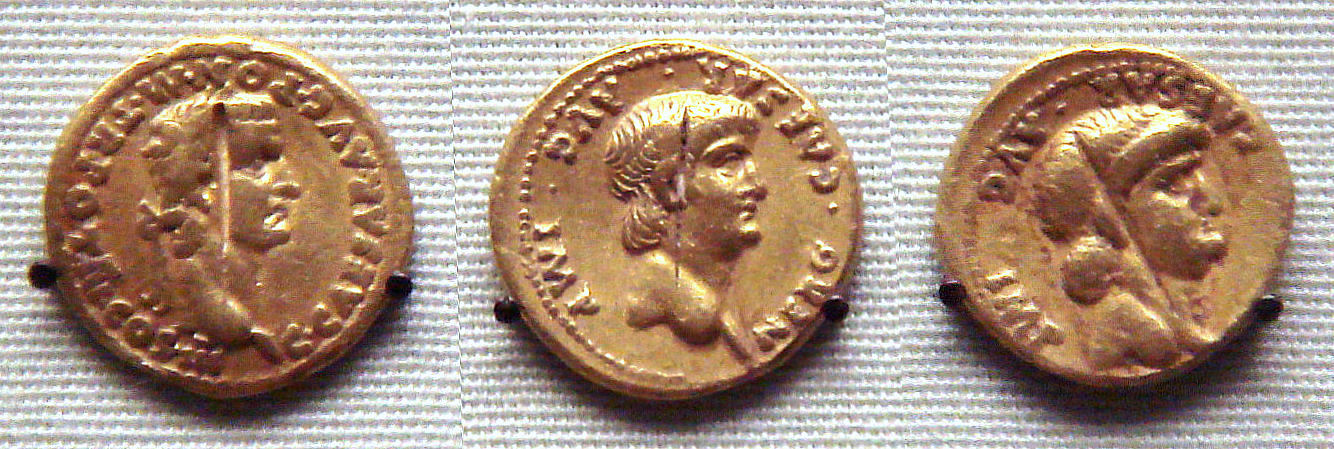
Roman gold coins excavated in Pudukottai, Tamil Nadu, India. One coin of Caligula (37–41 AD), and two coins of Nero (54–68 AD). British Museum.

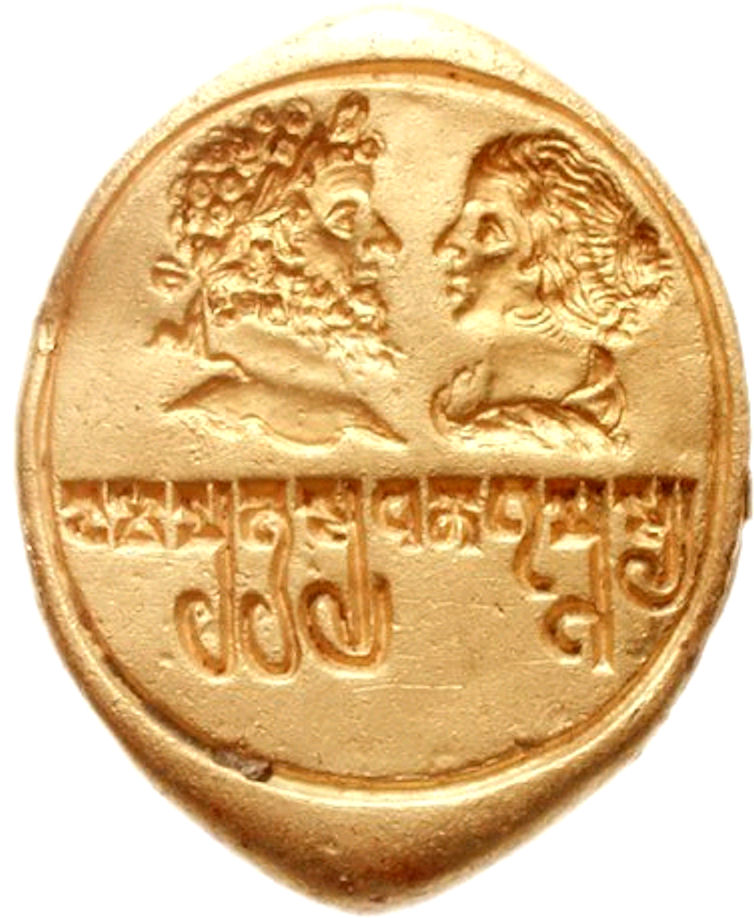
Kushan ring with portraits of Septimius Severus and Julia Domna.

Indo-Roman trade relations (see also the spice trade and incense road) was trade between the Indian subcontinent and the Roman Empire in Europe and the Mediterranean Sea. Trade through the overland caravan routes via Asia Minor and the Middle East, though at a relative trickle compared to later times, preceded the southern trade route via the Red Sea, which started around the beginning of the first century AD, following the reign of Augustus and his conquest of Egypt in 30 BC.

The southern route so helped enhance trade between the ancient Roman Empire and the Indian subcontinent, that Roman politicians and historians are on record decrying the loss of silver and gold to buy silk to pamper Roman wives, and the southern route grew to eclipse and then totally supplant the overland trade route. Roman and Greek traders frequented the ancient Tamil country, present day Southern India and Sri Lanka, securing trade with the seafaring Tamil states of the Pandyan, Chola and Chera dynasties and establishing trading settlements which secured trade with the Indian subcontinent by the Greco-Roman world since the time of the Ptolemaic dynasty a few decades before the start of the first century AD and remained long after the fall of the Western Roman Empire.

== Background ==
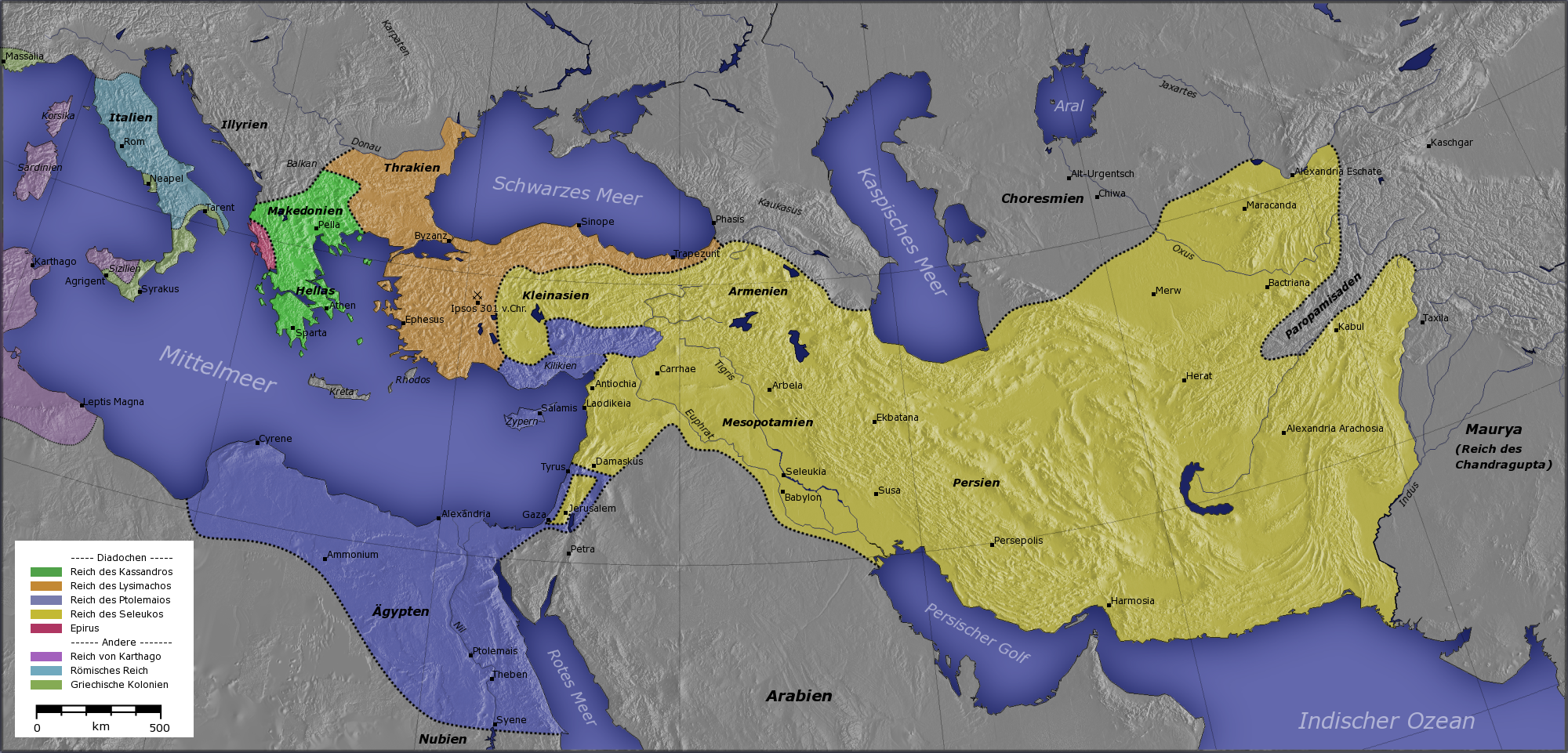
The Seleucid and the Ptolemaic dynasties controlled trade networks to India before the establishment of Roman Egypt. Kingdom of Ptolemy Kingdom of Seleucus

The Seleucid dynasty controlled a developed network of trade with the Indian subcontinent which had previously existed under the influence of the Achaemenid Empire. The Greek-Ptolemaic dynasty, controlling the western and northern end of other trade routes to Southern Arabia and the Indian subcontinent, had begun to exploit trading opportunities in the region prior to the Roman involvement but, according to the historian Strabo, the volume of commerce between Indians and the Greeks was not comparable to that of later Indo-Roman trade.

The Periplus Maris Erythraei mentions a time when sea trade between Egypt and the subcontinent did not involve direct sailings. The cargo under these situations was shipped to Aden:

Aden – Arabia Eudaimon was called the fortunate, being once a city, when, because ships neither came from India to Egypt nor did those from Egypt dare to go further but only came as far as this place, it received the cargoes from both, just as Alexandria receives goods brought from outside and from Egypt.

— Gary Keith Young, Rome's Eastern Trade: International Commerce and Imperial Policy

The Ptolemaic dynasty had developed trade with Indian kingdoms using the Red Sea ports. With the establishment of Roman Egypt, the Romans took over and further developed the already existing trade using these ports.

Classical geographers such as Strabo and Pliny the Elder were generally slow to incorporate new information into their works and, from their positions as esteemed scholars, were seemingly prejudiced against lowly merchants and their topographical accounts. Ptolemy's Geography represents somewhat of a break from this since he demonstrated an openness to their accounts and would not have been able to chart the Bay of Bengal so accurately had it not been for the input of traders. It is perhaps no surprise then that Marinus and Ptolemy relied on the testimony of a Greek sailor named Alexander for how to reach "Cattigara" (most likely Oc Eo, Vietnam, where Antonine-period Roman artefacts have been discovered) in the Magnus Sinus (i.e. Gulf of Thailand and South China Sea) located east of the Golden Chersonese (i.e. Malay Peninsula). In the 1st-century CE Periplus of the Erythraean Sea, its anonymous Greek-speaking author, a merchant of Roman Egypt, provides such vivid accounts of trade cities in Arabia and India, including travel times from rivers and towns, where to drop anchor, the locations of royal courts, lifestyles of the locals and goods found in their markets, and favorable times of year to sail from Egypt to these places in order to catch the monsoon winds, that it is clear he visited many of these locations.

== Establishment ==
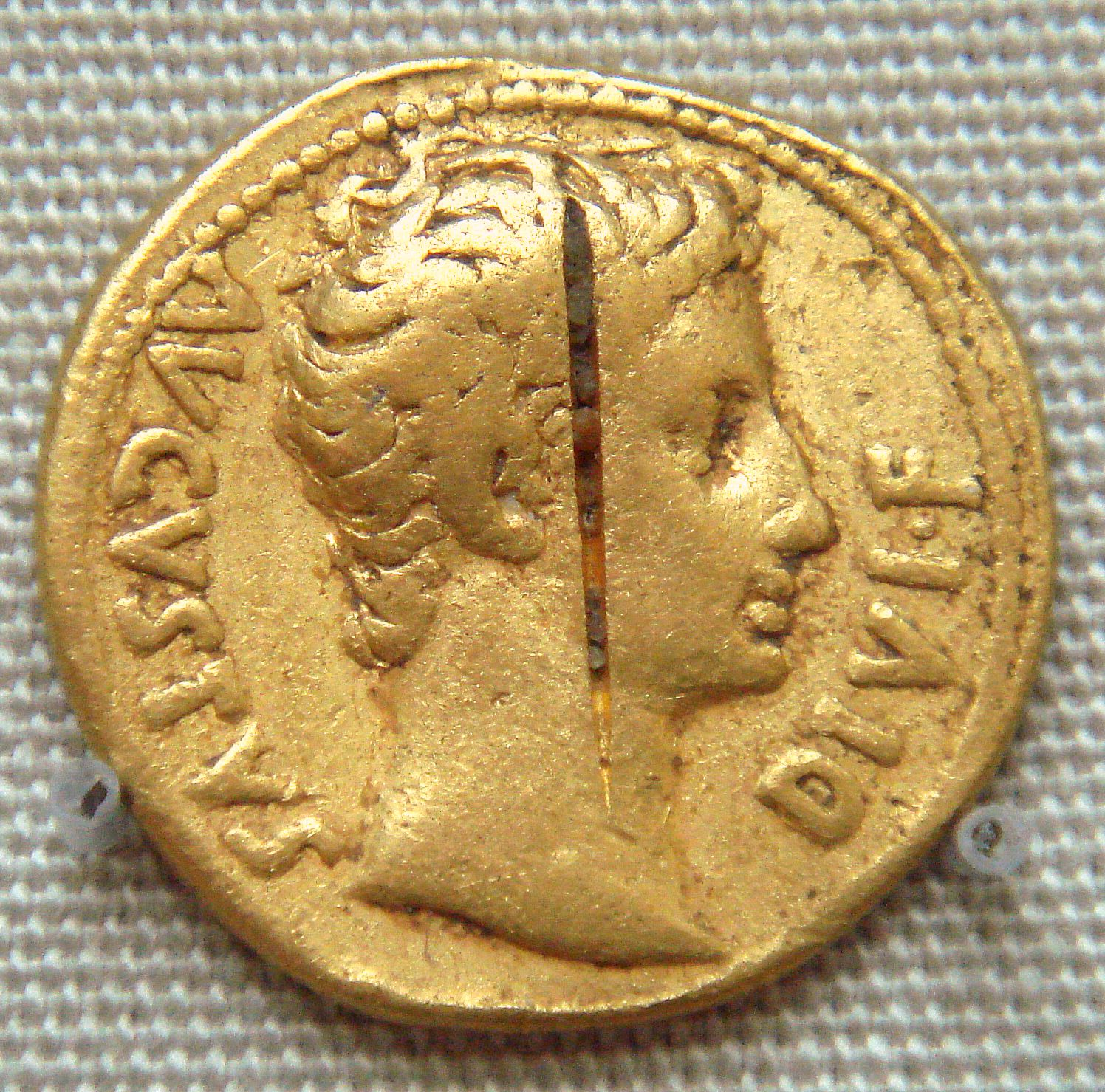
Coin of the Roman Emperor Augustus found at the Pudukottai hoard. British Museum.

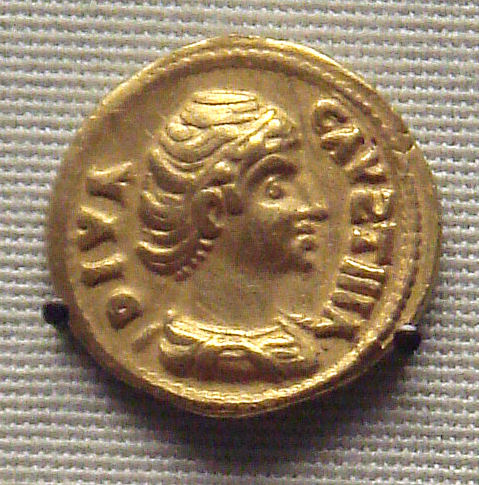
Indian copy of an aureus of Faustina Major, 2nd century AD. British Museum.

The replacement of Greek kingdoms by the Roman Empire as the administrator of the eastern Mediterranean basin led to the strengthening of direct maritime trade with the east and the elimination of the taxes extracted previously by the middlemen of various land based trading routes. Strabo's mention of the vast increase in trade following the Roman annexation of Egypt indicates that monsoon was known from his time.

The trade started by Eudoxus of Cyzicus in 130 BC kept increasing according to Strabo (II.5.12.):

At any rate, when Gallus was prefect of Egypt, I accompanied him and ascended the Nile as far as Syene and the frontiers of Kingdom of Aksum (Ethiopia), and I learned that as many as one hundred and twenty vessels were sailing from Myos Hormos to the subcontinent, whereas formerly, under the Ptolemies, only a very few ventured to undertake the voyage and to carry on traffic in Indian merchandise.

— Strabo

By the time of Augustus up to 120 ships were setting sail every year from Myos Hormos to India. So much gold was used for this trade, and apparently recycled by the Kushan Empire (Kushans) for their own coinage, that Pliny the Elder (NH VI.101) complained about the drain of specie to India:

India, China and the Arabian peninsula take one hundred million sesterces from our empire per annum at a conservative estimate: that is what our luxuries and women cost us. For what fraction of these imports is intended for sacrifices to the gods or the spirits of the dead?

— Pliny, Historia Naturae 12.41.84.

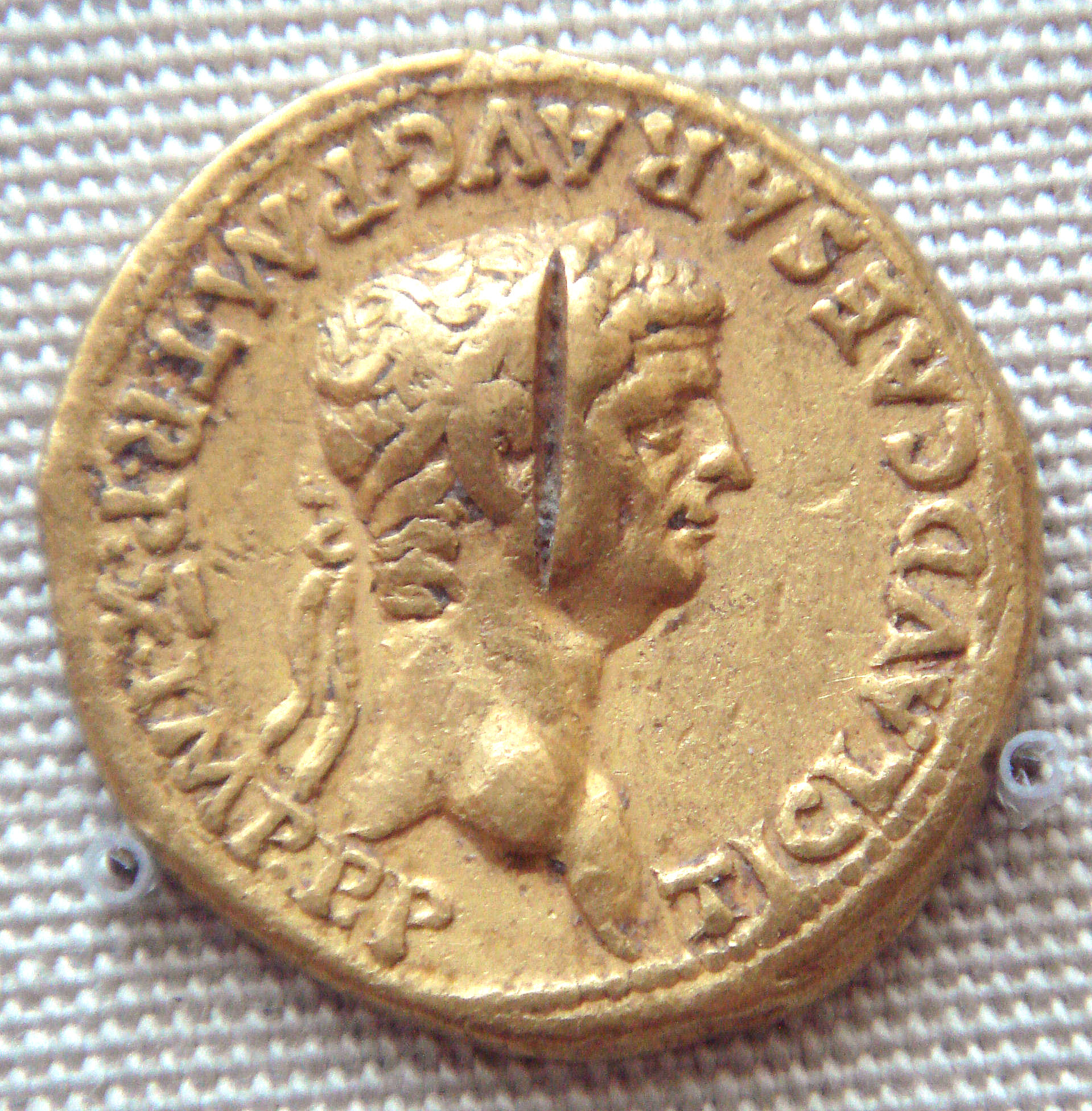
Gold coin of Claudius (50–51 AD) excavated in South India.

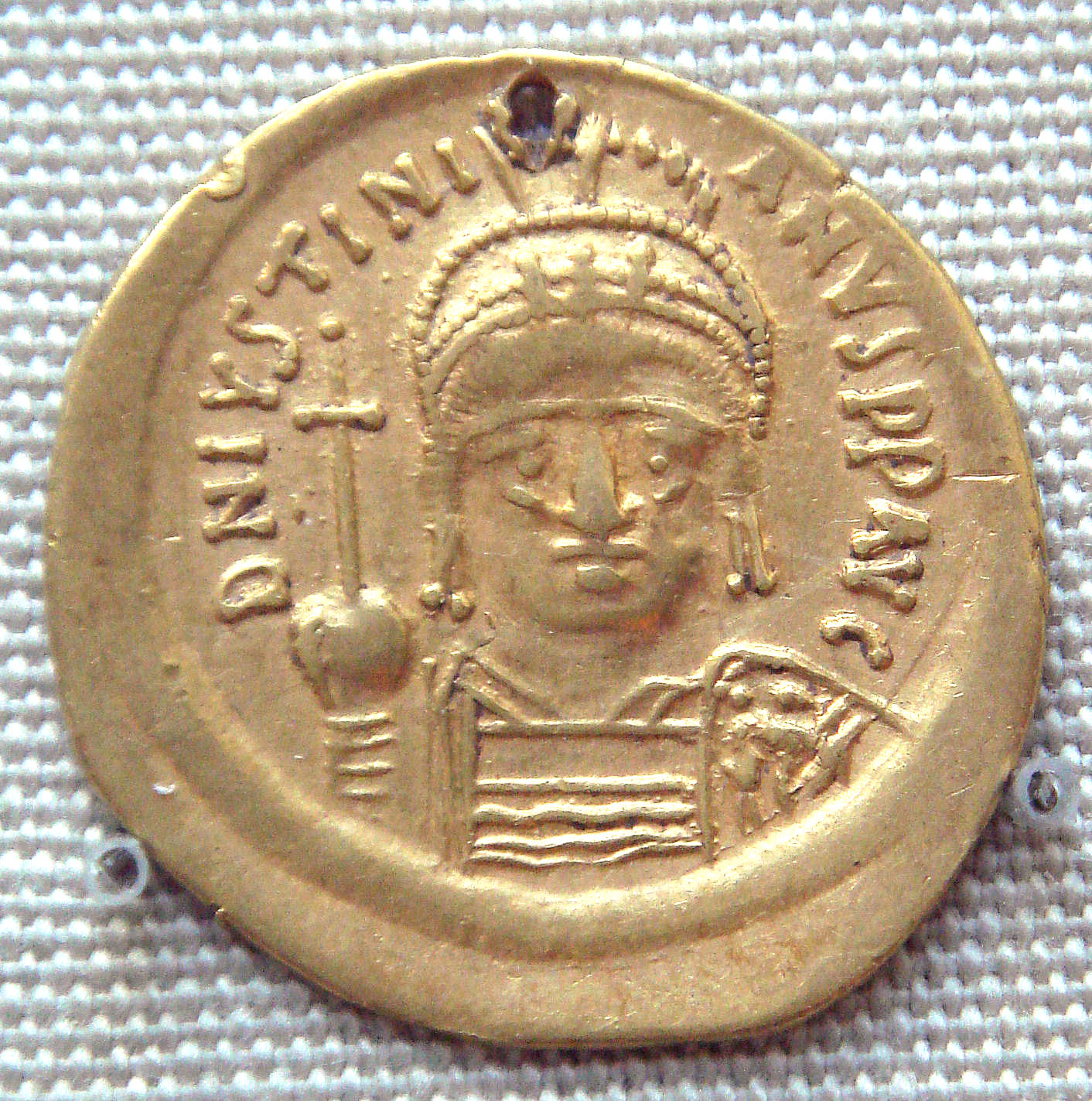
Gold coin of Justinian I (527–565 AD) excavated in India probably in the south.

== Trade of exotic animals ==
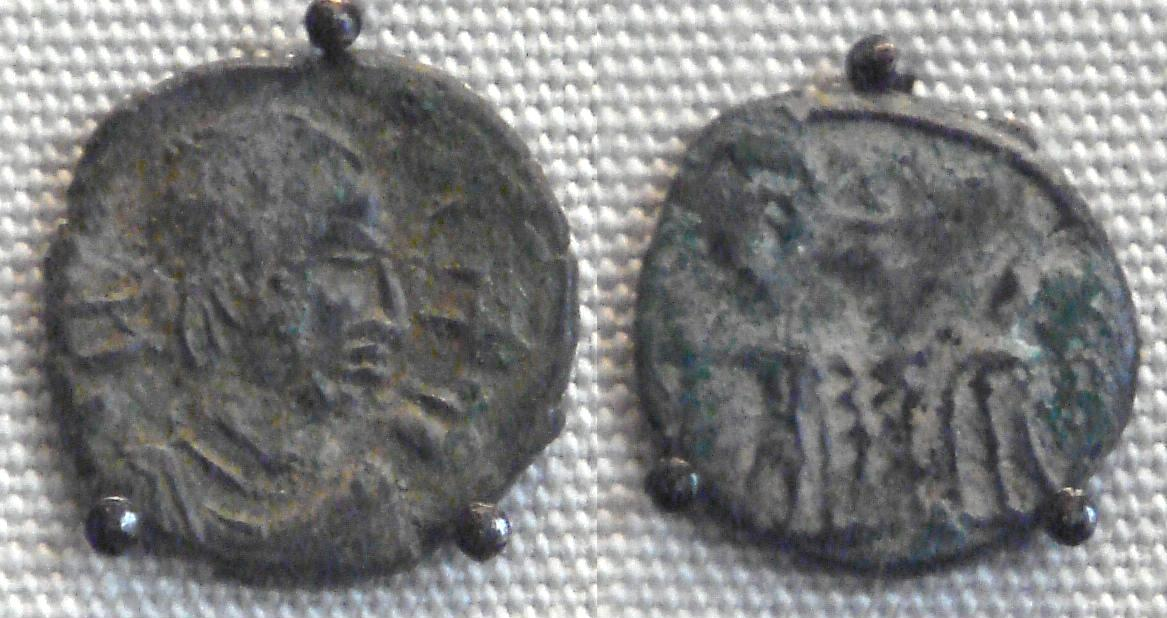
Sri Lankan imitations of 4th-century Roman coins, 4th–8th century AD.

There is evidence of animal trade between Indian Ocean harbours and the Mediterranean. This can be seen in the mosaics and frescoes of the remains of Roman villas in Italy. For example, the Villa del Casale has mosaics depicting the capture of animals in India, Indonesia and Africa. The intercontinental trade of animals was one of the sources of wealth for the owners of the villa. In the Ambulacro della Grande Caccia the hunting and capture of animals is represented in such detail that it is possible to identify the species. There is a scene that shows a technique to distract a tiger with a shimmering ball of glass or mirror in order to take her cubs. Tiger hunting with red ribbons serving as a distraction is also shown. In the mosaic there are also numerous other animals such as rhinoceros, an Indian elephant (recognized from the ears) with his Indian conductor, the Indian peafowl, and other exotic birds. There are also numerous animals from Africa. Tigers, leopards and Asian and African lions were used in the arenas and circuses. The European lion was already extinct at that time. Probably the last lived in the Balkan Peninsula and were hunted to stock arenas. The birds and monkeys entertained the guests of many villas. Also in the Villa Romana del Tellaro there is a mosaic with a tiger in the jungle attacking a man with Roman clothes, probably a careless hunter. The animals were transported in cages by ship.

== Ports ==
=== Roman ports ===
The three main Roman ports involved with eastern trade were Arsinoe, Berenice and Myos Hormos. Arsinoe was one of the early trading centers but was soon overshadowed by the more easily accessible Myos Hormos and Berenice.

==== Arsinoe ====
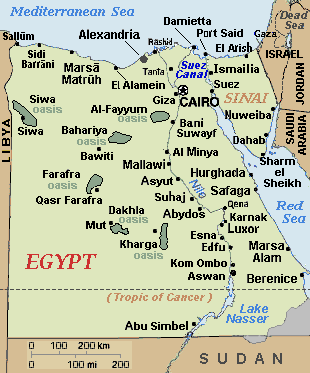
Sites of Egyptian Red Sea ports, including Alexandria and Berenice.

The Ptolemaic dynasty exploited the strategic position of Alexandria to secure trade with the subcontinent. The course of trade with the east then seems to have been first through the harbor of Arsinoe, the present day Suez. The goods from the East African trade were landed at one of the three main Roman ports, Arsinoe, Berenice or Myos Hormos. The Romans repaired and cleared out the silted up canal from the Nile to harbor center of Arsinoe on the Red Sea. This was one of the many efforts the Roman administration had to undertake to divert as much of the trade to the maritime routes as possible.

Arsinoe was eventually overshadowed by the rising prominence of Myos Hormos. The navigation to the northern ports, such as Arsinoe-Clysma, became difficult in comparison to Myos Hormos due to the northern winds in the Gulf of Suez. Venturing to these northern ports presented additional difficulties such as shoals, reefs and treacherous currents.

==== Myos Hormos and Berenice ====
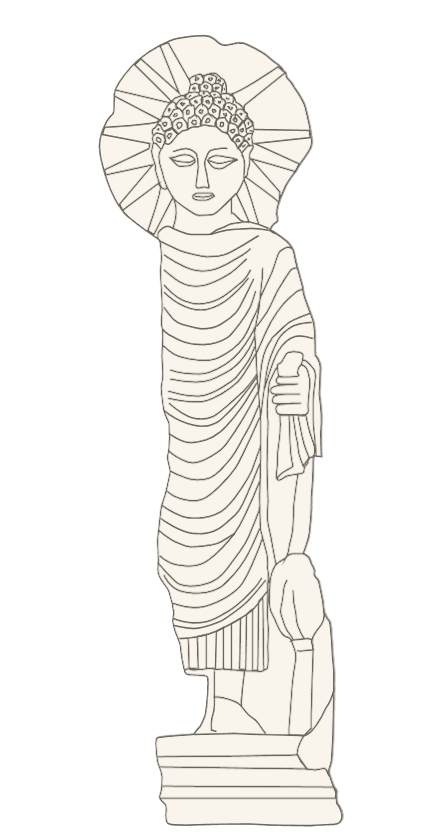
The Berenike Buddha, discovered in Berenice, Egypt, in 2022.

Myos Hormos and Berenice appear to have been important ancient trading ports, possibly used by the Pharaonic traders of ancient Egypt and the Ptolemaic dynasty before falling into Roman control.

The site of Berenice, since its discovery by Belzoni (1818), has been equated with the ruins near Ras Banas in Southern Egypt. However, the precise location of Myos Hormos is disputed with the latitude and longitude given in Ptolemy's Geography favoring Abu Sha'ar and the accounts given in classical literature and satellite images indicating a probable identification with Quseir el-Quadim at the end of a fortified road from Koptos on the Nile. The Quseir el-Quadim site has further been associated with Myos Hormos following the excavations at el-Zerqa, halfway along the route, which have revealed ostraca leading to the conclusion that the port at the end of this road may have been Myos Hormos. Excavations at the site reveal a multi-ethnic community, as evidenced by inscriptions in Tamil, Greek, Latin, South Arabian, Nabataic, and Palmyrene.

In Berenike in March 2022 an American-Polish archaeological mission excavating the main early Roman period temple dedicated to the Goddess Isis uncovered in the forecourt of the temple a marble statue of a Buddha, the Berenike Buddha, suggesting the presence of Buddhist merchants from India in Egypt at that time.

=== Major regional ports ===
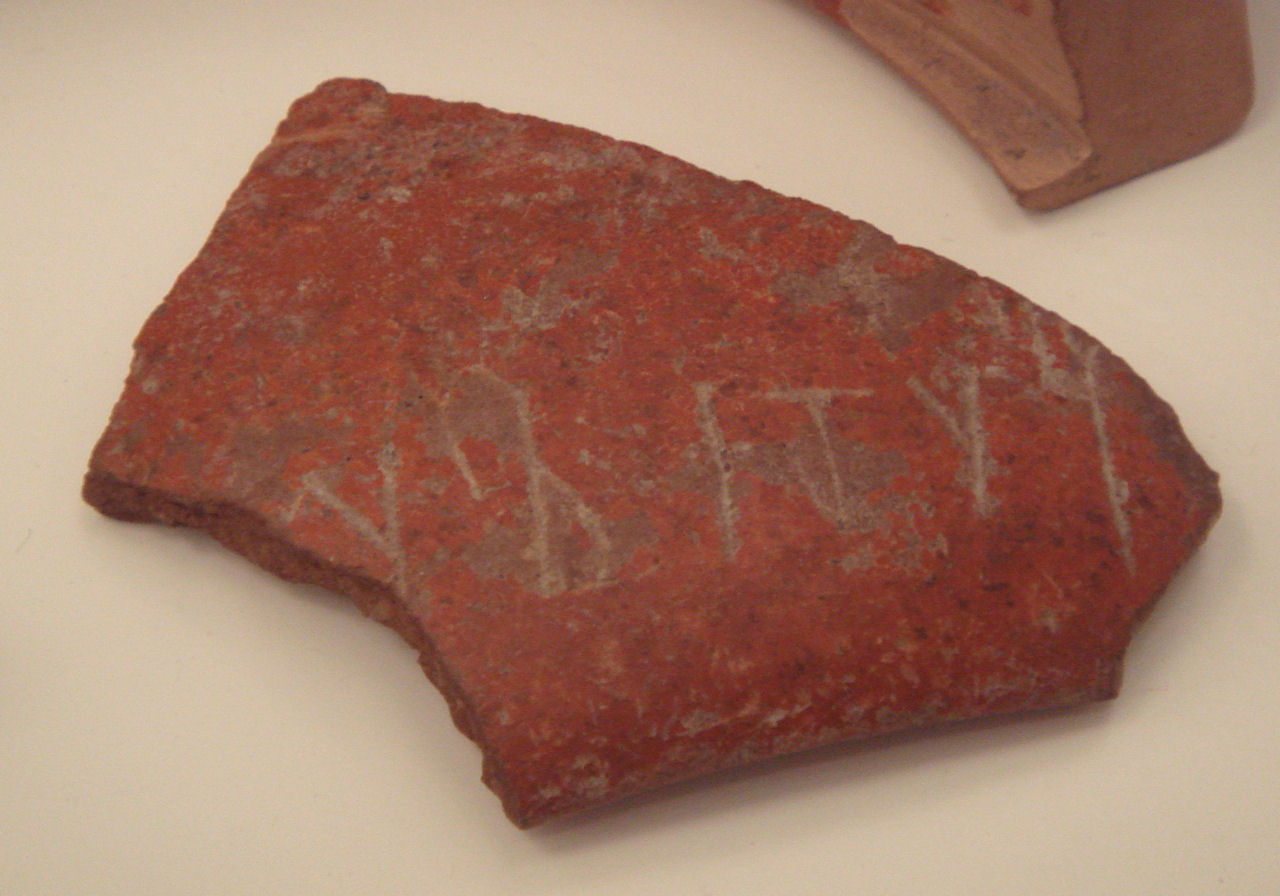
Roman piece of pottery from Arezzo, Latium, found at Virampatnam, Arikamedu (1st century AD). Musee Guimet.

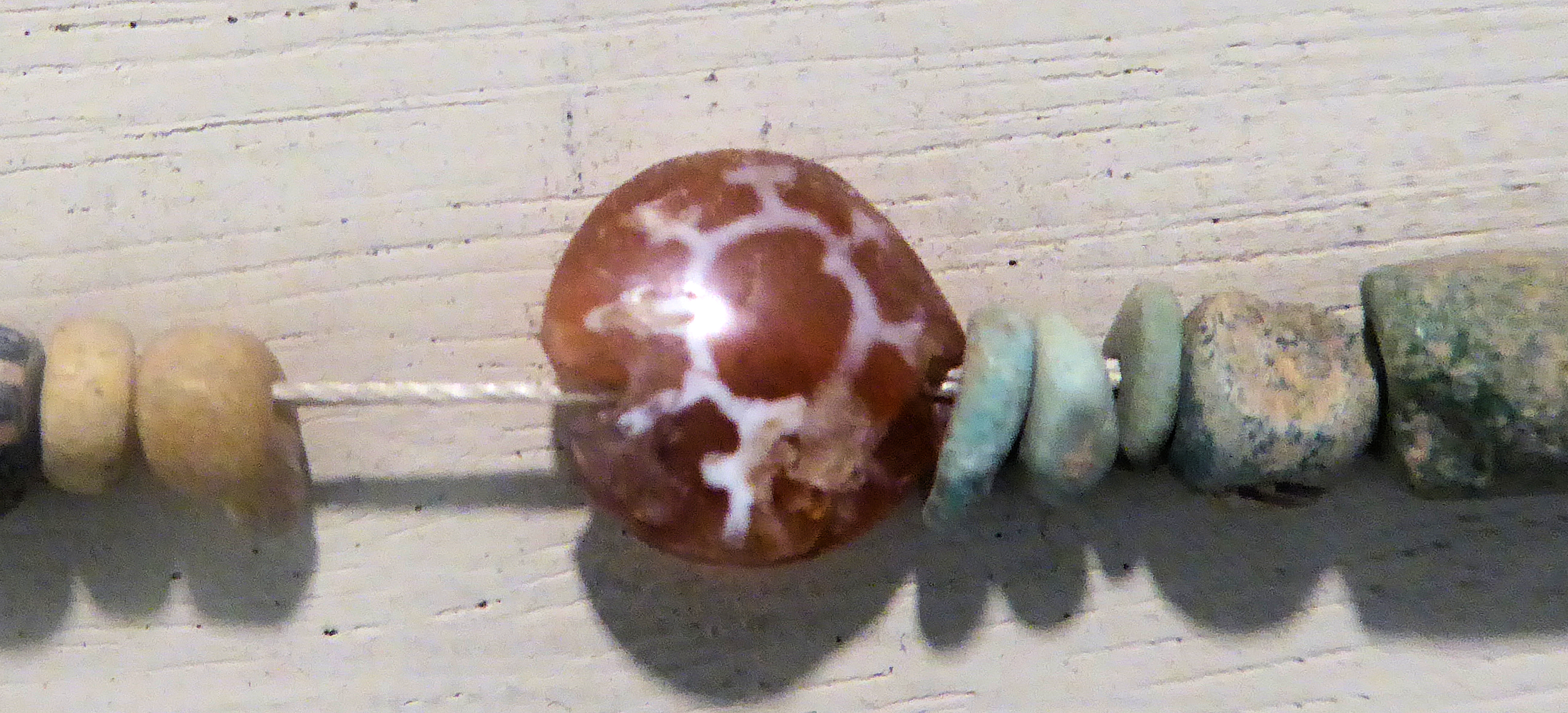
Characteristic Indian etched carnelian bead, found in Ptolemaic Period excavations at Saft el Henna, Ptolemaic Egypt. Petrie Museum.

The regional ports of Barbaricum (modern Karachi), Sounagoura (central Bangladesh), Barygaza (Bharuch in Gujarat), Muziris (present day Kodungallur), Korkai, Kaveripattinam and Arikamedu (Tamil Nadu) on the southern tip of present-day India were the main centers of this trade, along with Kodumanal, an inland city. The Periplus Maris Erythraei describes Greco-Roman merchants selling in Barbaricum "thin clothing, figured linens, topaz, coral, storax, frankincense, vessels of glass, silver and gold plate, and a little wine" in exchange for "costus, bdellium, lycium, nard, turquoise, lapis lazuli, Seric skins, cotton cloth, silk yarn, and indigo". In Barygaza, they would buy wheat, rice, sesame oil, cotton and cloth.

==== Barigaza ====
Trade with Barigaza, under the control of the Indo-Scythian Western Satrap Nahapana ("Nambanus"), was especially flourishing:

There are imported into this market-town (Barigaza), wine, Italian preferred, also Laodicean and Arabian; copper, tin, and lead; coral and topaz; thin clothing and inferior sorts of all kinds; bright-colored girdles a cubit wide; storax, sweetclover, flint glass, realgar, antimony, gold and silver coin, on which there is a profit when exchanged for the money of the country; and ointment, but not very costly and not much. And for the King there are brought into those places very costly vessels of silver, singing boys, beautiful maidens for the harem, fine wines, thin clothing of the finest weaves, and the choicest ointments. There are exported from these places spikenard, costus, bdellium, ivory, agate and carnelian, lycium, cotton cloth of all kinds, silk cloth, mallow cloth, yarn, long pepper and such other things as are brought here from the various market-towns. Those bound for this market-town from Egypt make the voyage favorably about the month of July, that is Epiphi.

— Periplus of the Erythraean Sea (paragraph 49).

==== Muziris ====
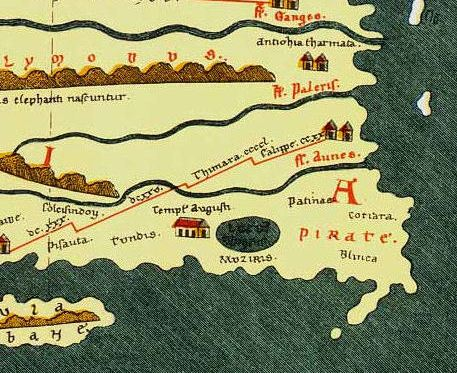
Muziris, as shown in the Tabula Peutingeriana, with a "Templum Augusti"

Muziris is a lost port city on the south-western coast of India which was a major center of trade in the ancient Tamil land between the Chera kingdom and the Roman Empire. Its location is generally identified with modern-day Cranganore (central Kerala). Large hoards of coins and innumerable shards of amphorae found at the town of Pattanam (near Cranganore) have elicited recent archeological interest in finding a probable location of this port city.

According to the Periplus, numerous Greek seamen managed an intense trade with Muziris:

Then come Naura and Tyndis, the first markets of Damirica (Limyrike), and then Muziris and Nelcynda, which are now of leading importance. Tyndis is of the Kingdom of Cerobothra; it is a village in plain sight by the sea. Muziris, of the same Kingdom, abounds in ships sent there with cargoes from Arabia, and by the Greeks; it is located on a river, distant from Tyndis by river and sea five hundred stadia, and up the river from the shore twenty stadia"

— The Periplus of the Erythraean Sea (53–54)

==== Arikamedu ====
The Periplus Maris Erythraei mentions a marketplace named Poduke (ch. 60), which G.W.B. Huntingford identified as possibly being Arikamedu in Tamil Nadu, a centre of early Chola trade (now part of Ariyankuppam), about 3 kilometres (1.9 mi) from the modern Pondicherry. Huntingford further notes that Roman pottery was found at Arikamedu in 1937, and archeological excavations between 1944 and 1949 showed that it was "a trading station to which goods of Roman manufacture were imported during the first half of the 1st century AD".

== Cultural exchanges ==
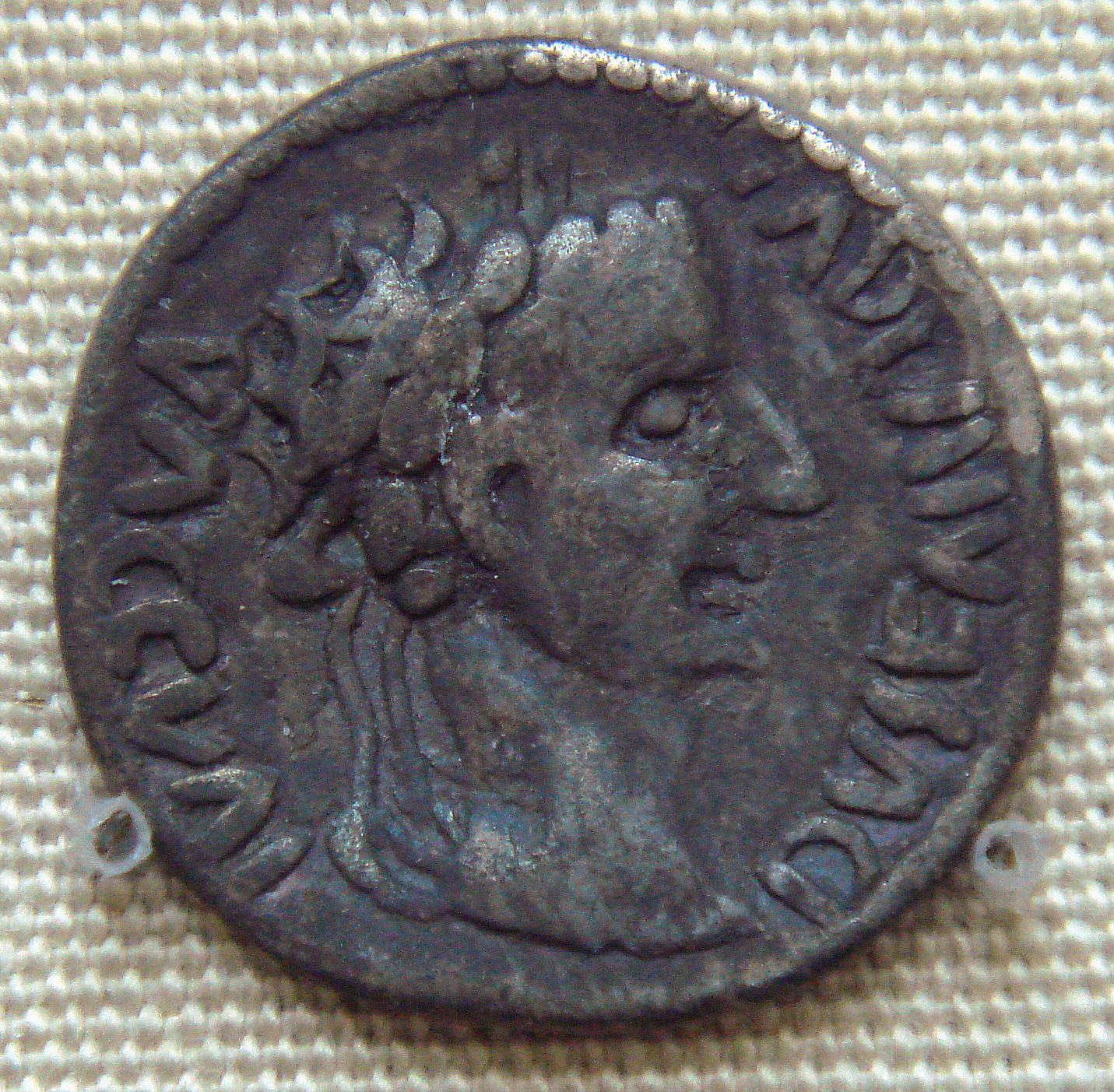
A 1st century AD Indian imitation of a coin of Augustus, British Museum.

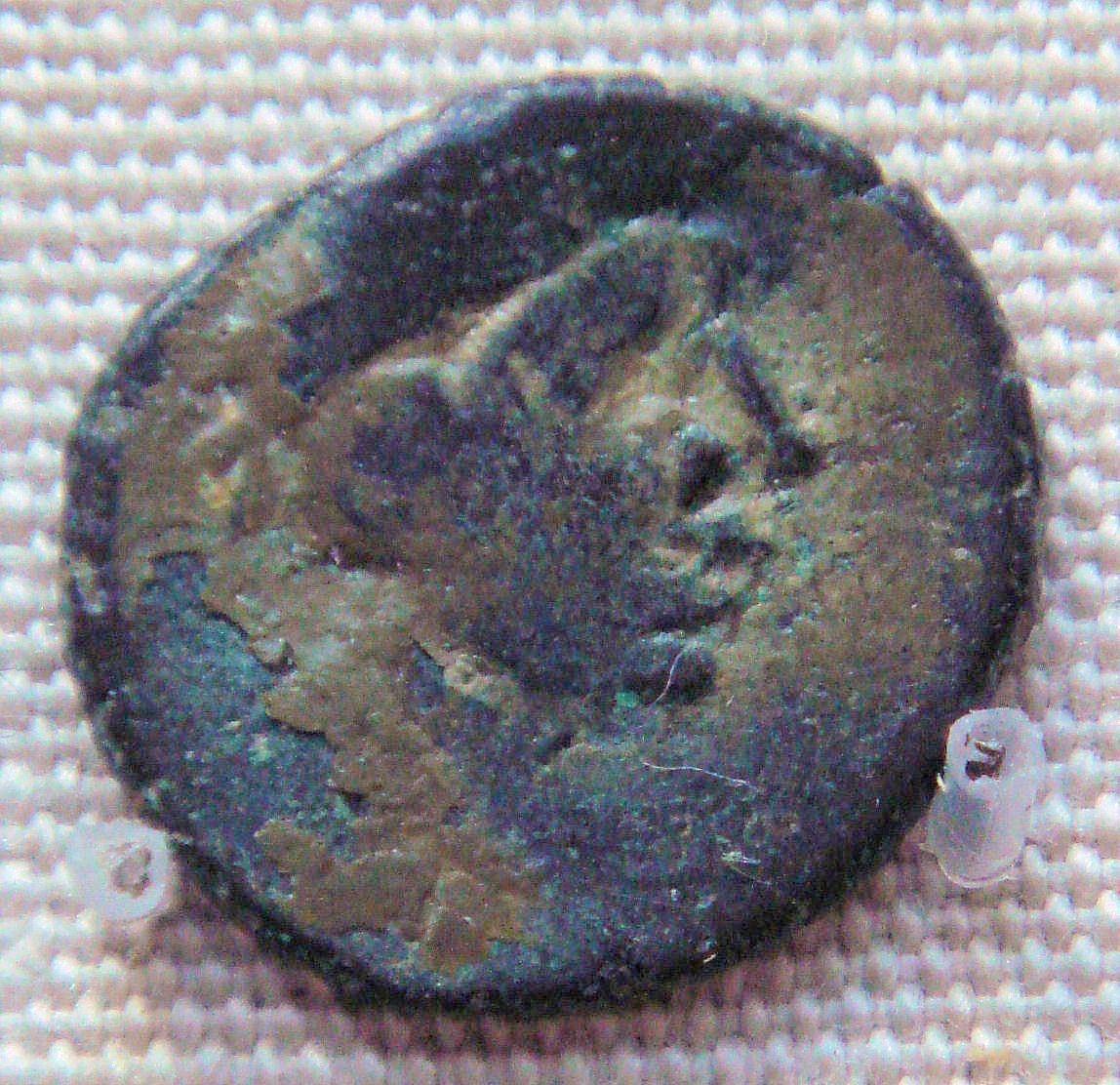
Bronze imitation of a Roman coin, Sri Lanka, 4th–8th century AD

The Rome-subcontinental trade also saw several cultural exchanges which had a lasting effect on both the civilizations and others involved in the trade. The Ethiopian kingdom of Aksum was involved in the Indian Ocean trade network and was influenced by Roman culture and Indian architecture. Traces of Indian influences are visible in Roman works of silver and ivory, or in Egyptian cotton and silk fabrics used for sale in Europe. The Indian presence in Alexandria may have influenced the culture but little is known about the manner of this influence. Clement of Alexandria mentions the Buddha in his writings and other Indian religions find mentions in other texts of the period.

Han China was perhaps also involved in the Roman trade, with Roman embassies recorded for the years 166, 226, and 284 that allegedly landed in Rinan (Jiaozhi) in northern Vietnam, according to Chinese histories. Roman coins and goods such as glasswares and silverwares have been found in China, as well as Roman coins, bracelets, glass beads, a bronze lamp, and Antonine-period medallions in Vietnam, especially at Oc Eo (belonging to the Funan Kingdom). The 1st-century Periplus notes how a country called This, with a great city called Thinae (comparable to Sinae in Ptolemy's Geography), produced silk and exported it to Bactria before it traveled overland to Barygaza in India and down the Ganges River. While Marinus of Tyre and Ptolemy provided vague accounts of the Gulf of Thailand and Southeast Asia, the Alexandrian Greek monk and former merchant Cosmas Indicopleustes, in his Christian Topography (c. 550), spoke clearly about China, how to sail there, and how it was involved in the clove trade stretching to Ceylon. Comparing the small amount of Roman coins found in China as opposed to India, Warwick Ball asserts that most of the Chinese silk purchased by the Romans was done so in India, with the land route through ancient Persia playing a secondary role.

Christian and Jewish settlers from Rome continued to live in India long after the decline in bilateral trade. Large hoards of Roman coins have been found throughout India, and especially in the busy maritime trading centers of the south. The Tamilakkam kings reissued Roman coinage in their own name after defacing the coins in order to signify their sovereignty. Mentions of the traders are recorded in the Tamil Sangam literature of India. One such mention reads: "The beautifully built ships of the Yavanas came with gold and returned with pepper, and Muziris resounded with the noise." (from poem no. 149 of 'Akananuru' of Sangam Literature)"

== Decline and aftermath ==
=== Roman decline ===
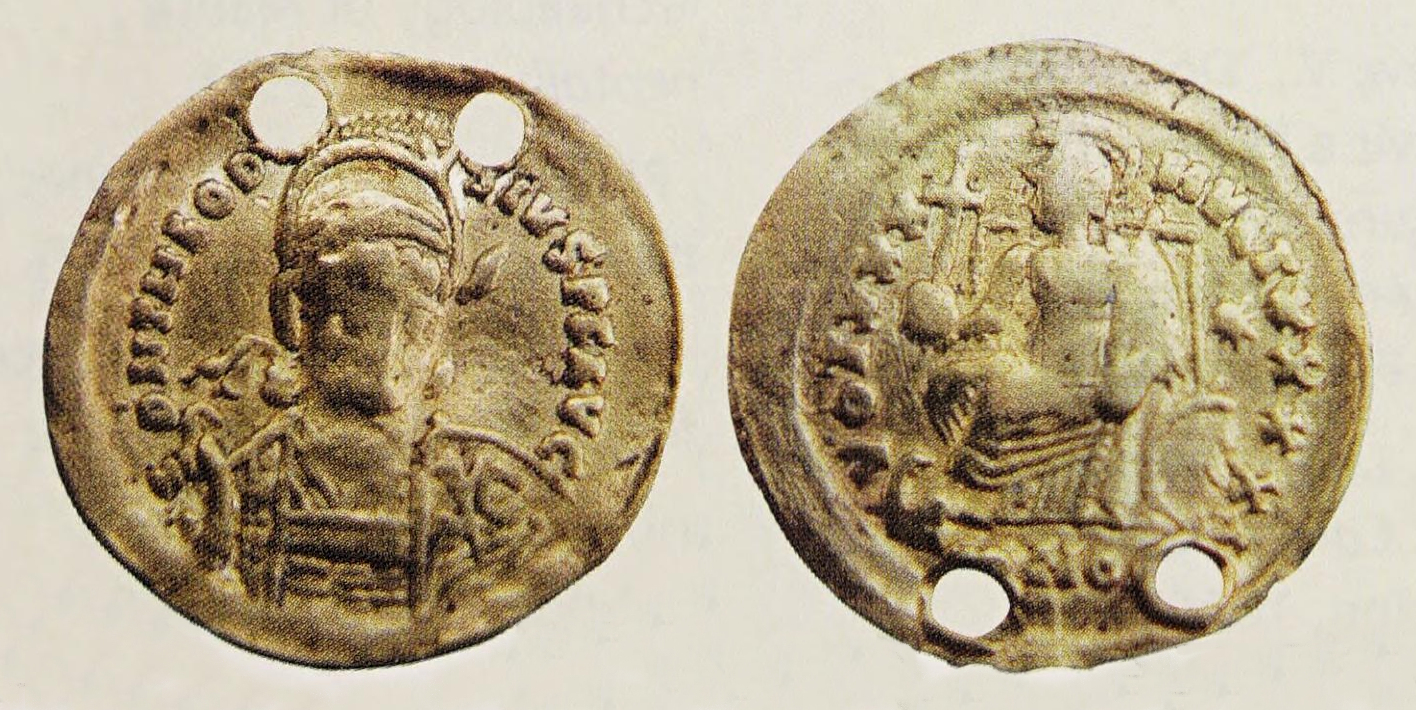
Coin of Byzantine emperor Theodosius II, found in the excavation of a monastery in Ajanta Caves, India.

Trade declined from the mid-3rd century during a crisis in the Roman Empire, but recovered in the 4th century until the early 7th century, when Khosrow II, Shah of the Sasanian Empire, occupied the Roman parts of the Fertile Crescent and Egypt until being defeated by the Eastern Roman Emperor Heraclius at the end of 627, after which the lost territories were returned to the Eastern Romans. Cosmas Indicopleustes ('Cosmas who sailed to India') was a Greek-Egyptian trader, and later monk, who wrote about his trade trips to India and Sri Lanka in the 6th century.

=== Ravaging of the Gupta Empire by the Huns ===
Gupta Empire (c. 319-579 AD)

Find spots of epigraphic inscriptions (red dots) indicating local control by the Alchon Huns in India between 500-530 AD, with neighbouring polities, and territorial extent of the Alchon Huns (brown).

The Gupta Empire had greatly benefited from Indo-Roman trade through the export of numerous luxury products such as silk, leather goods, fur, iron products, ivory, pearl or pepper from the ports of Bharutkutccha, Kalyan, Sind and the city of Ujjaini.

The Alchon Huns' invasions (496–534 AD) are said to have seriously damaged the Guptas' (c. 319–579 AD) trade with Europe and Central Asia. Soon after the invasions, the Gupta Empire, already weakened by these invasions and the rise of local rulers, ended as well. Following the invasions, northern India was left in disarray, with numerous smaller Indian powers emerging after the crumbling of the Guptas.

=== Arab expansion ===
Egypt under the rule of the Rashidun and Umayyad Caliphates, drawn on the modern state borders.

The Arabs, led by 'Amr ibn al-'As, crossed into Egypt in late 639 or early 640 AD. This advance marked the beginning of the Islamic conquest of Egypt. The capture of Alexandria and the rest of the country brought an end to 670 years of Roman trade with the subcontinent.

Tamil speaking south India turned to Southeast Asia for international trade where Indian culture influenced the native culture to a greater degree than the sketchy impressions made on Rome seen in the adoption of Hinduism and then Buddhism. However, knowledge of the Indian subcontinent and its trade was preserved in Byzantine books and it is likely that the court of the Emperor still maintained some form of diplomatic relation to the region up until at least the time of Constantine VII, seeking an ally against the rising influence of the Islamic states in the Middle East and Persia, appearing in a work on ceremonies called De Ceremoniis.

The Ottoman Turks conquered Constantinople in the 15th century (1453), marking the beginning of Turkish control over the most direct trade routes between Europe and Asia. The Ottomans initially cut off eastern trade with Europe, leading in turn to the attempt by Europeans to find a sea route around Africa, spurring the European Age of Discovery, and the eventual rise of European mercantilism and colonialism.

== See also ==
- Ancient Greece–Ancient India relations
- Buddhism and the Roman world
- Chronology of European exploration of Asia
- Economic history of India
- Historic GDP of India (1-1947 CE)
- Indus–Mesopotamia relations
- Indian maritime history
- Indo-Roman relations
- Maritime Silk Road
- Meluhha trade with Sumer
- Sino-Roman relations
