= Pompeii Lakshmi =

Indian figurine found in Italy

Pompeii Yakshi
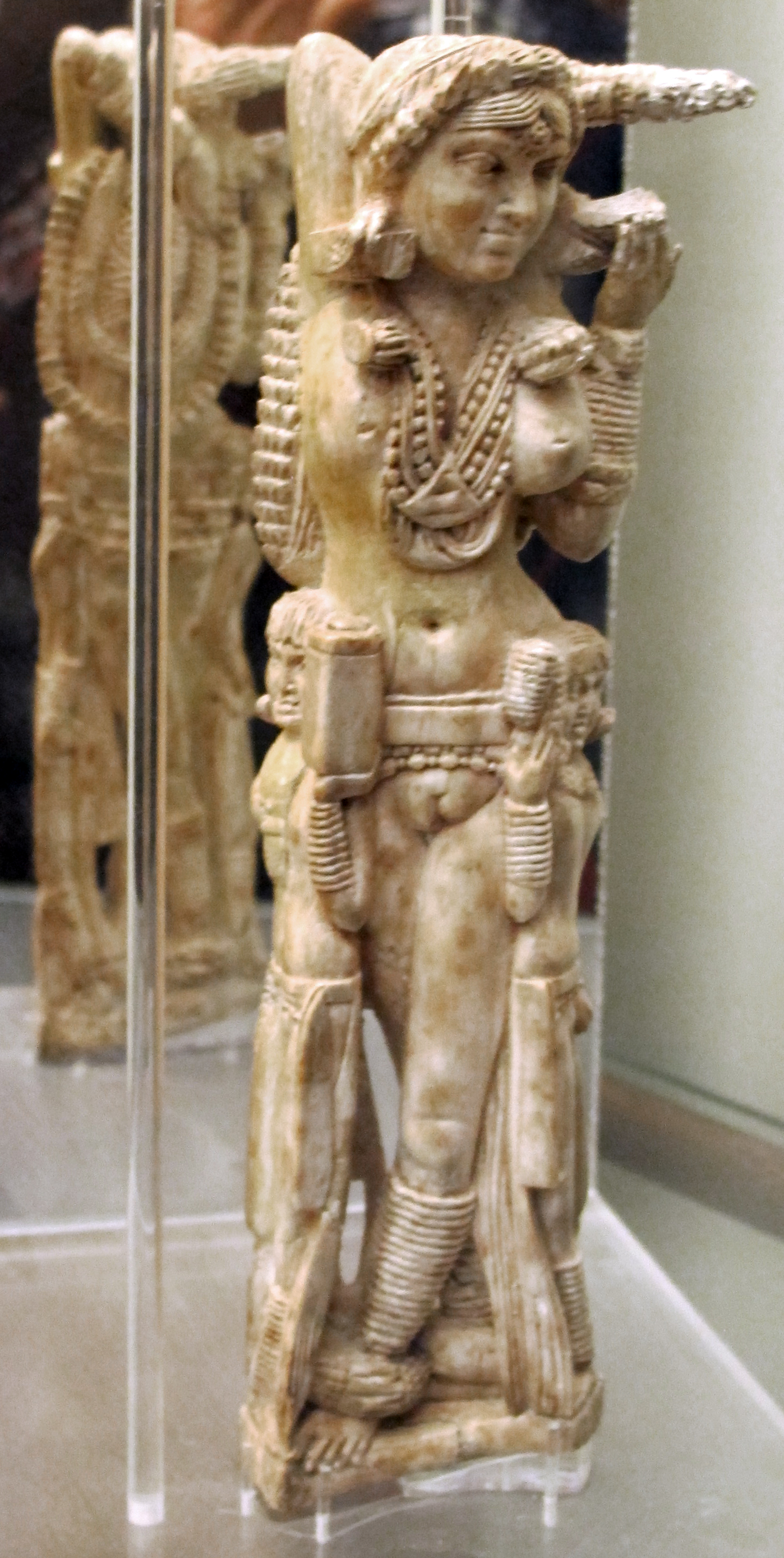
- An ivory statuette of Lakshmi (1st century CE), found in the ruins of Pompeii
- Material: Ivory
- Height: 24.5 cm (9 1/2 in)
- Discovered: October 1938; Pompeii
- Present location: Secret Museum, Naples, Italy
- Identification: 149425

Location
- Location of Pompeii, where the Lakshmi statuette was excavated

The Pompeii Lakshmi is an ivory statuette that was discovered in the ruins of Pompeii, a Roman city destroyed in the eruption of Mount Vesuvius 79 CE. It was found by Amedeo Maiuri, the Italian Director of Pompei excavations, in 1938. The statuette has been dated to possibly the first century BCE but more like the first century CE It is possible that the sculpture originally - or more likely secondarily - formed the handle of a mirror. The statuette is evidence of commercial trade between India and Rome in the first century CE one of the few Indian imports to the Roman Empire that - unlike wood, cloth and spices - did not disintegrate.

In the 1939 publication about the discovery, Maiuri and Prof. De Lorenzo argued that the statuette represented the goddess Lakshmi, a goddess of wealth and fortune, revered by early Hindus, Buddhists and Jains. (even if they seemed to identify her more with love and beauty). However, even though the name continues to be used, very few scholars now believe her to be a Lakshmi. The iconography, in particular the exposed genitals, reveals that the figure is more likely to depict a yakshi, a female tree spirit that represents fertility, or possibly a syncretic version of Venus-Sri-Lakshmi from an ancient exchange between Classical Greco-Roman and Indian cultures or perhaps even an idealized woman, courtesan or queen.

The figure is now in the Secret Museum section of the Naples National Archaeological Museum.

== Contents ==
The statuette was discovered in October 1938 in Region 1, Insula 8, House 5. It is near the now-oft photographed Thermopolium of Vetutius Placidus. The house is near the House of the Four Styles but attributions to that as the find-spot are in error based on bad translations of the Italian. Based on its architectural remains and floor plan, this "House of the Indian Statuette" directly off of the Via dell'Abbondanza, is now believed to have belonged to a successful merchant even if we still do not know his identity. The house had 14 rooms (including one room off the atrium with two boat graffiti scratched in the plaster) and a peristyle garden in which the statue was unearthed.

Many luxurious commodities were found in the House and all across Pompei and Herculaneum, suggesting that Romans in the 1st century CE had a fascination with antiquities not just from Greece but also from remote cultures, and that Romans had a desire to acquire objects they considered exotic. In the ancient world ivory was considered very precious and elites such as Seneca (the tutor of the Emperor Nero) were said to have 500 tables with citrus wood tops and ivory legs. For middle class people ivory could also be found but usually in smaller objects such as whisks, gaming pieces or hairpins.

Standing at 0.24 metres (9.4 in), high the statuette is nearly naked apart from her narrow girdle and lavish jewels as well as an elaborate coiffure. She has two female attendants, one facing outward on each side, holding what might be cosmetics containers. The statuette has a hole bored down from the top of her head. It was originally thought that its purpose may have been a mirror handle, but has since been considered to be the leg of a piece of furniture. or conceivable in another furniture context (arm rest, tripod ornament).

The existence of this statuette in Pompeii by 79 CE, when Mount Vesuvius erupted and buried the city, testifies to the intensity of Indo-Roman trade relations during the 1st century CE. This statuette has been dated by the Naples National Archaeological Museum as having been created in India in the first half of that century.

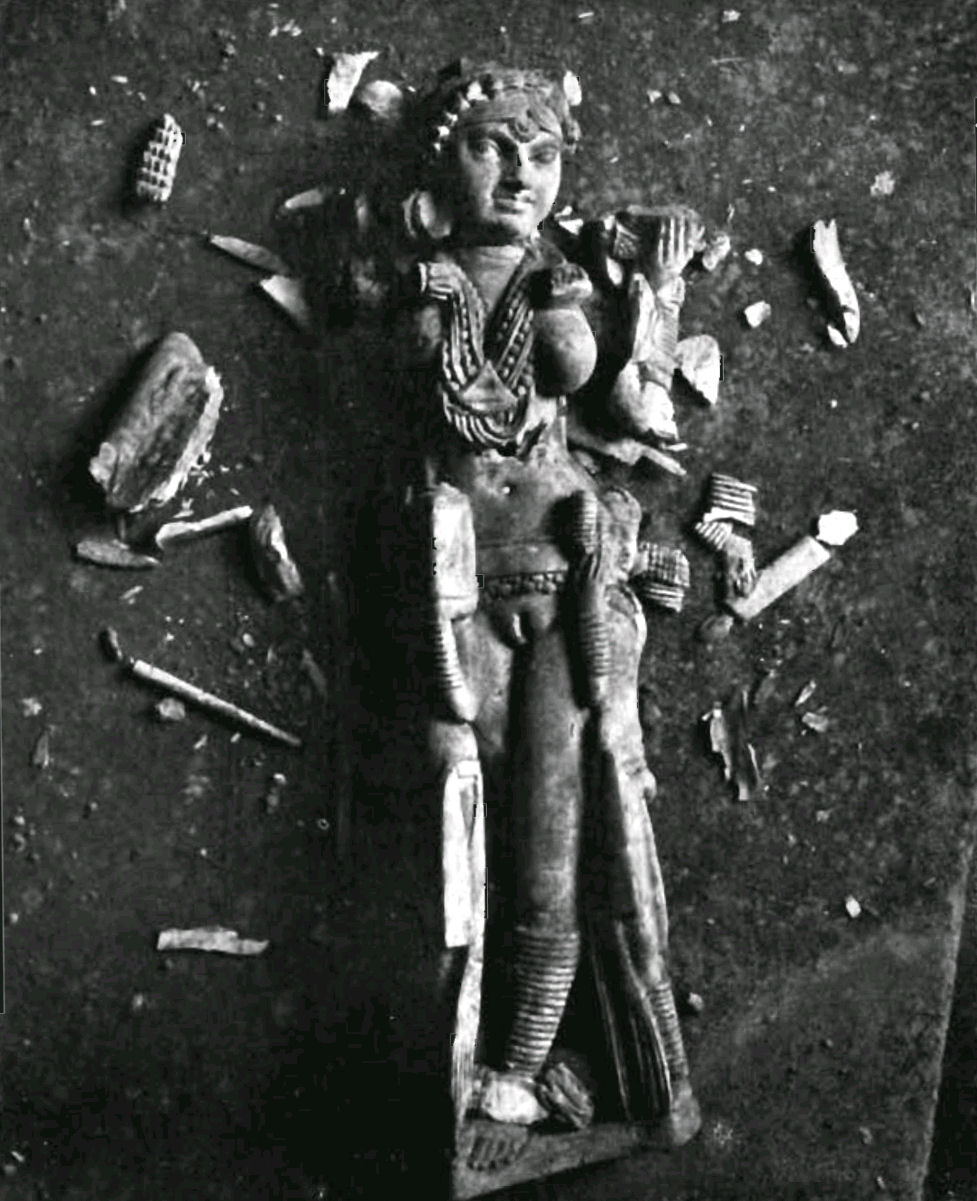
The statuette upon discovery in Pompeii, before reconstitution.

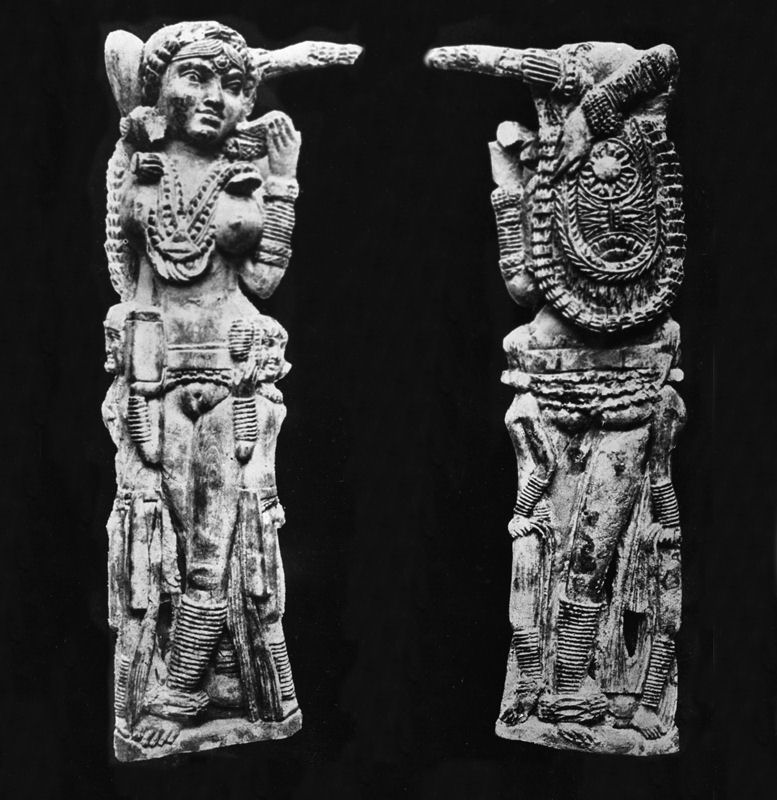
The Pompeii Lakshmi, front and back.

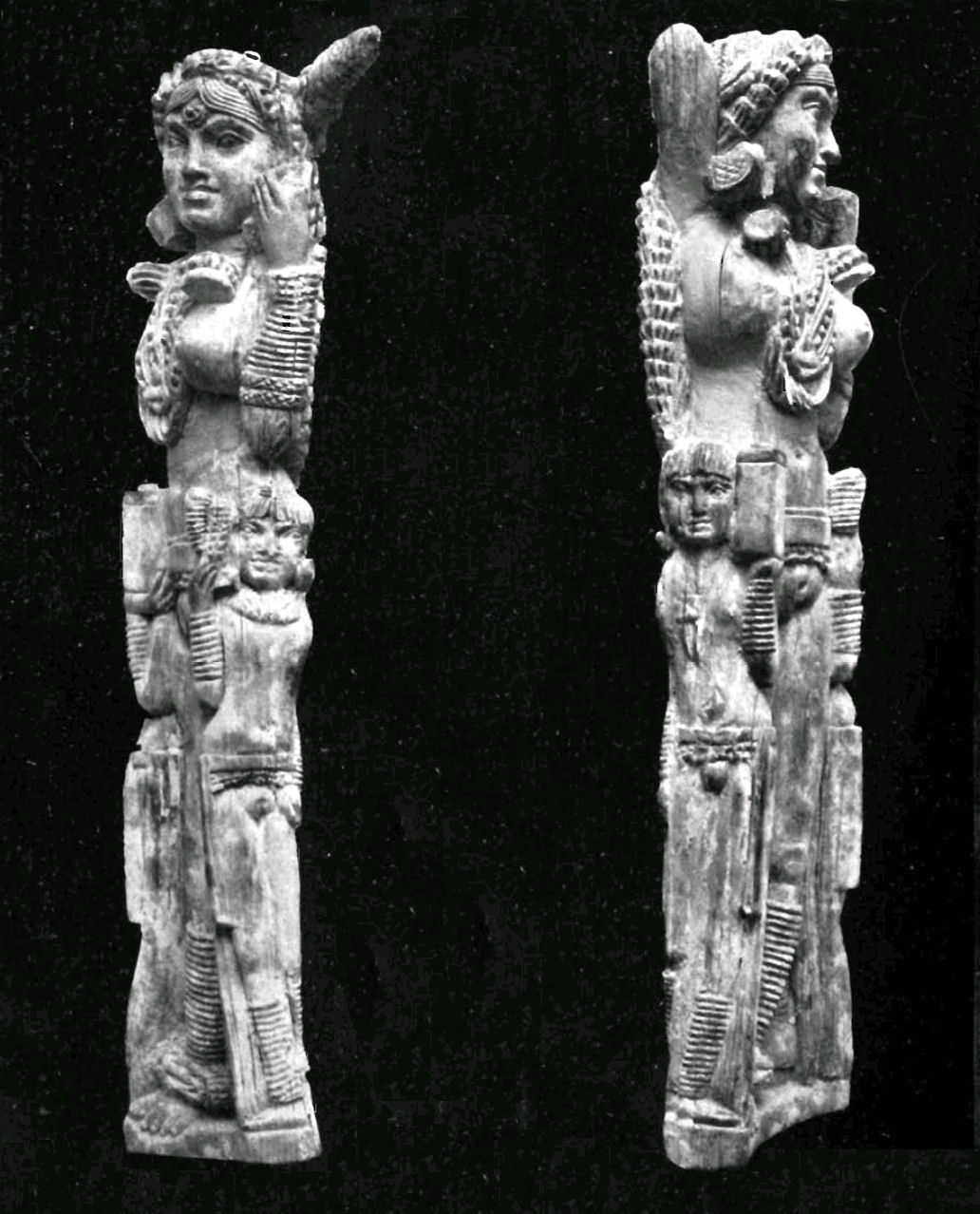
Sides of the statuette.

== Trade ==
Though the origin is not entirely certain, based on archeological finds and historian work, the so-called Pompeii Lakshmi has had a questionable origin. There is evidence of the then-active trade routes between the Roman Empire under Emperor Nero and India during this time period. According to Pollard, with the Roman long-distance trade, she is believed to have been in Pompei already during the reign of Augustus. Though most scholars argue the trade was at its peak under Nero, 54-68 AD/CE, so even if potentially created earlier, perhaps imported in this period. According to Weinstein, there was an original object that broke in the massive earthquake of 62, therefore we might be able to narrow the import date to before 61 AD.CE. This trade took place along several routes, both overland as documented by Isidore of Charax’s Parthian Stations, and by sea as the 1st century merchant guide known as the Periplus Maris Erythraei reveals. More and more evidence is emerging that the majority of the trade between India and Arabia (and then further to the Roman Empire) was across the Indian Ocean, not overland and not on the so-called Spice Route, but a "spice route" on the sea.

Based on the discovery of two comparanda in former Satavahana territory, the statue seems likely created under the Satavahana dynasty whose territory included key sites such as Paithan (the capital), Ter, Bhokardan, Sanchi and the major port of Barygaza. There is a possibility that the statuette found its way to the west during the rule of Western Satrap Nahapana in the Bhokardan area, and was shipped from the port of Barigaza. Rome played an important role in the Eastern trade of antiquity, they imported many goods from India and at the same time set up their own trading stations in the country. According to Cobb, trading through land routes such as crossing the Arabian Peninsula and Mesopotamia, and through seaborne trade from the Red Sea and the Indian Ocean were used by the Romans. Roman objects including many coins, but also jewelry, bronze statues, amphora for garum, oil & wine, oil lamps, terracotta, coral, metal, and glass objects have been found at at least 50 sites in India. Some of these might have been for resident foreign traders but much was for the Indian population, including the Ujjain court.

The wealth of the trade was significant enough for Pliny to claim that 100 million sesterces were being sent annually to India, China, and Arabia. With shipments of nard, ivory, and textiles it is clear from the archaeological evidence, that Roman trade with the East peaked in the first and second centuries CE. This time period also witnessed a material shift among Roman craftsmanship, which rapidly began to favor imported ivory over traditional bone for use in furniture, musical instruments, accessories, and more. The insatiable desire for artisan ivory work even led to the creation of a politically powerful guild of Roman ivory workers: the Eborarii.

== Origin ==
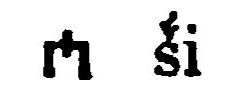
The Kharosthi letter śi was inscribed on the base of the statuette.

It was initially assumed that the statuette had been produced at Mathura, but according to Dhavalikar and others it is now thought that its place of production was Bhokardan since an almost identical figurine was discovered there. (unfortunately only the upper half). Bhokardan was a part of the Satavahana territory and cultural sphere, although it might have been held for a few decades by the Western Satraps, who may have been the ones who provided an export route to the Roman world.

There is also an inscriptive mark in Kharosthi at the base of the Pompeii statuette (the letter śi, as the śi in Shiva). This suggests the statue might have originated from the northwestern regions of India, Pakistan, or Afghanistan, or at least passed through these areas. Since the Pompeii statuette was necessarily made sometime before 79 CE, if it was indeed manufactured in Gandhara, it would suggest that the Begram ivories are also of this early date, in the 1st century CE. That said there is an argument that the script on the base may actually be Brahmi, more common in the south.

=== Iconography ===
The statuette is represented in the round, and the center of two other female figures. The legs are turned to its side and the left arm bent to hold what was perhaps earrings. The right arm is stretched over the head and touching te left scapula. She is presumed to only be looked at from the front because the details from the back are flatter than the front, but so intricately carved that we cannot discount she was meant to be seen in the round. As stated by D’Ancona, the iconography falls into the broad category of female deities in India.

Bhokardan, India, where similar statuettes were found, and from where the Pompeii statuette may have originated.

In a case of cross-cultural pollination, the theme of the goddess attended by two youthful attendants, which can be seen in the case of the Pompeii Lakshmi, is an uncommon depiction of Lakshmi or Yakshis in Indian art. Though we do see river goddesses depicted with attendants. The statuette is not sitting or standing on a lotus flower as is the norm in Lakshmi iconography. According to D'Ancona, the iconography represented in this statuette may have been imported from the Classical world, possibly derived from the iconography of Venus attended by cherubs holding cosmetics containers, which are well known in Greco-Roman art. She may be one of the several representations of Venus-Sri-Lakshmi that appeared in the 1st century CE, states D'Ancona. Another example of this common Roman representation of Venus attended by cupids can be seen in the Los Angeles Getty Villa's "Imitation of a Statuette of a Female Reclining on a Couch with Erotes." The extreme ornamentation of this statuette and the semi-nudity of the female figure are both reminiscent of the Pompeii Lakshmi. Syncretism between Roman and foreign deities was not uncommon, especially with Egyptian deities like Isis and Osiris. In Pompeii, the Romanization of deities (Interpretatio Romana) could absolutely explain the seeming mixture of Indian and Classical art present in the Pompeii Lakshmi.

An early relief from Sanchi Stupa No.2 with a broadly similar scene of Lakshmi with two child attendants may have served as the initial inspiration for the Pompeii Lakshmi, especially knowing that the Satavahanas were in control of Sanchi from 50 BCE onward. But the yakshi on the torana at Sanchi are much more similar to the statuette, and it seems odd Maiuri (or de Lorenzo) overlooked them. It is thought that these early reliefs at Sanchi Stupa No.2 were made by craftsmen from the northwest, specifically from the Indo-Greek region of Gandhara, as the reliefs bear mason's marks in Kharoshthi, as opposed to the local Brahmi script. The craftsmen were probably responsible for the foreign-looking motifs and figures that can be found on the railings of the stupa.

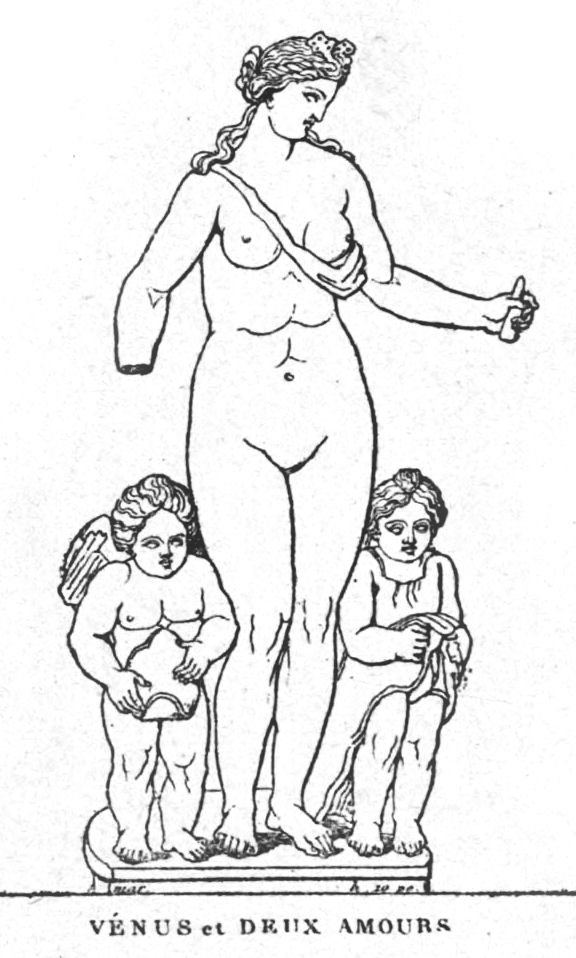
Venus with cupid attendants.

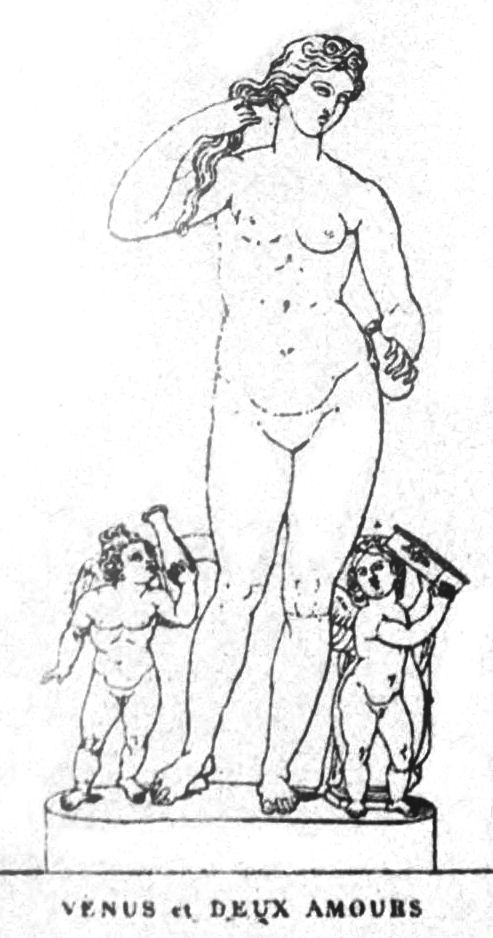
Venus with cupid attendants.

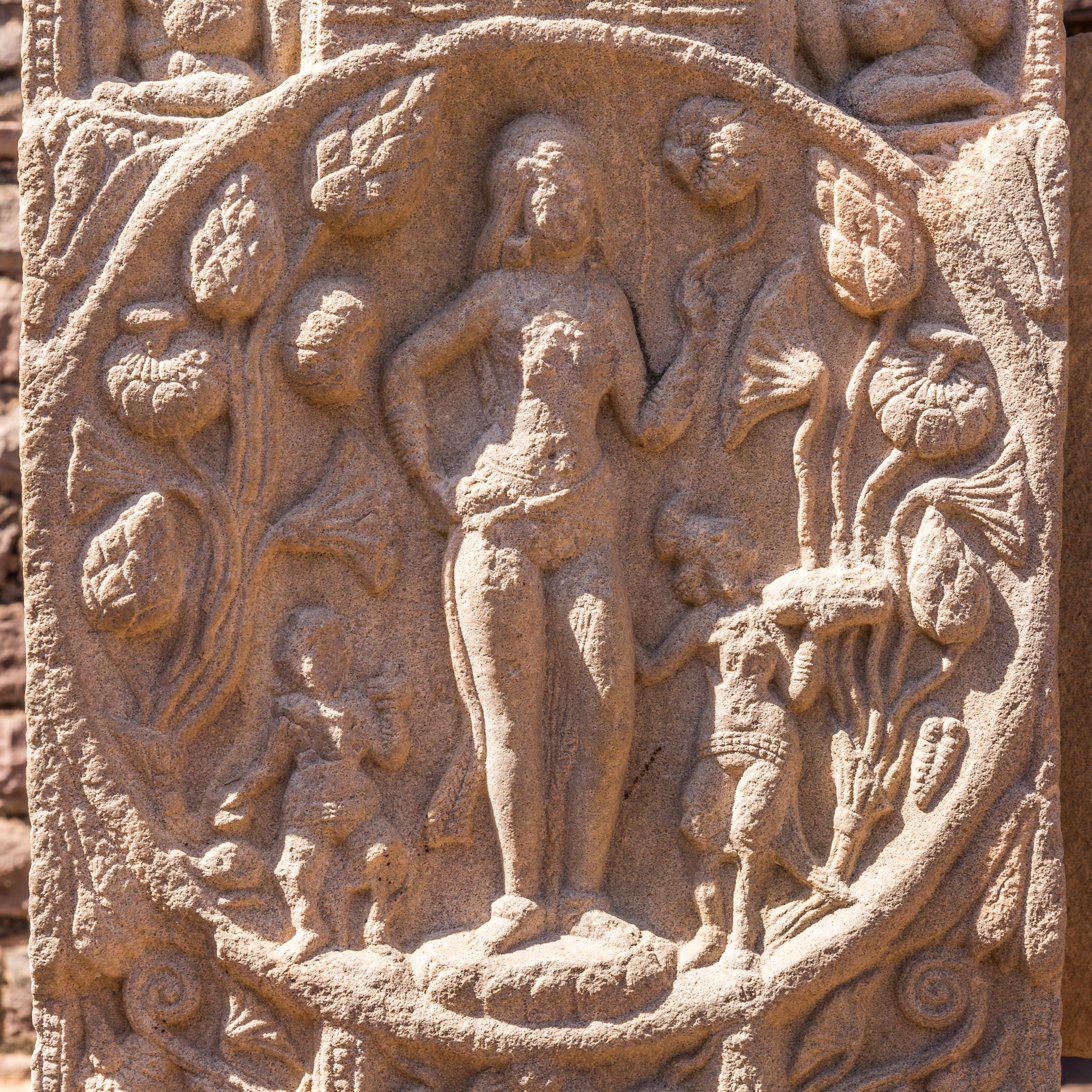
Lakshmi with lotus and child attendants, Sanchi Stupa No.2, 115 BCE.

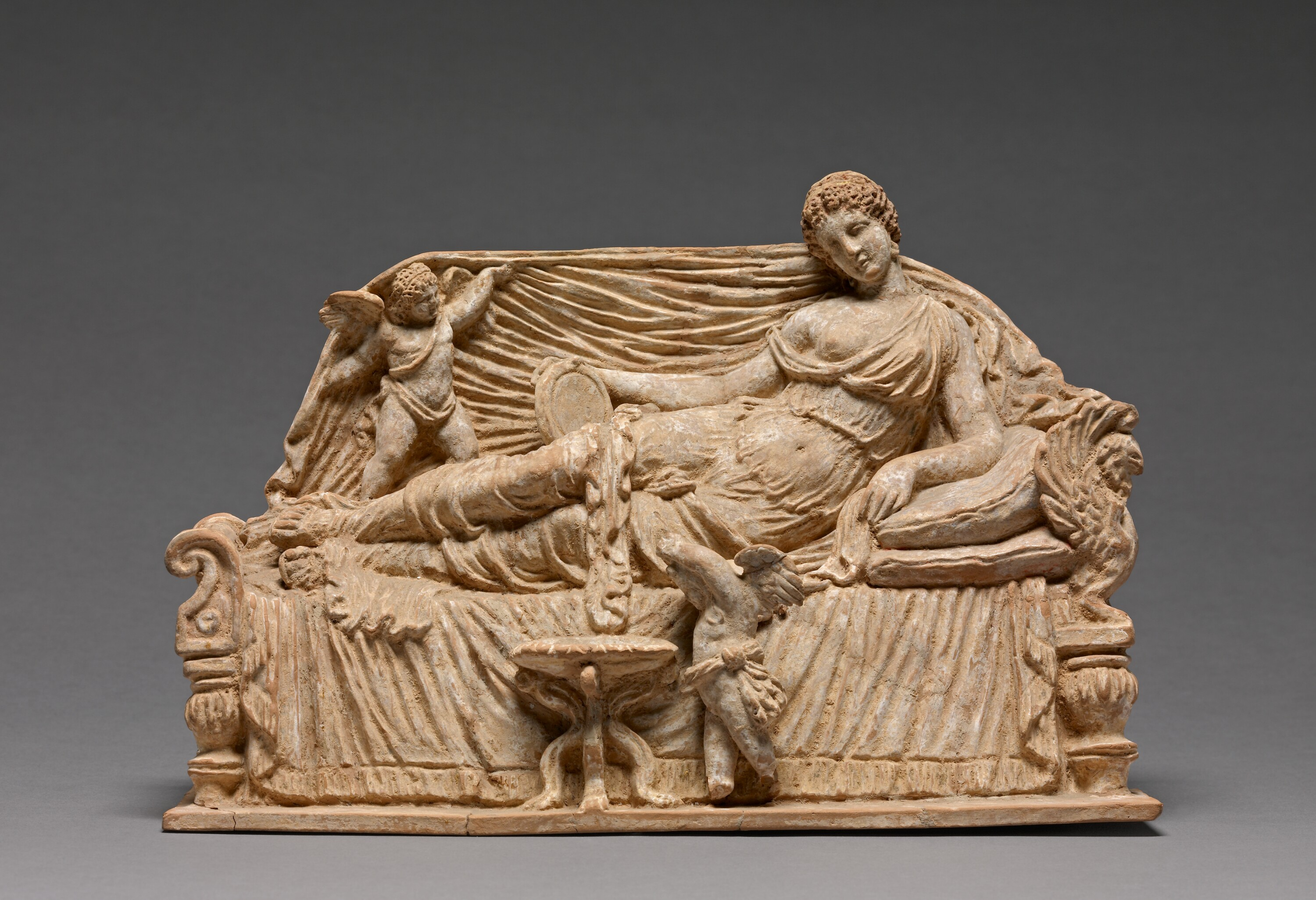
A woman, almost certainly Venus, reclines on a couch accompanied by two cupid attendants (reproduction)

== See also ==
- Sator Square, discovered at Pompeii
