= Berenike Buddha =

Buddha statue discovered in 2018 and 2022

- Photograph of the Berenike Buddha, front and side views
- Material: Parian marble
- Size: 71 centimetres (28 in)
- Created: c. 2nd century CE, possibly in Alexandria
- Present location: Egypt

Location
- Location of Berenike, where the Buddha was excavated

The Berenike Buddha is a statue of the Buddha, parts of which were discovered in January 2018 and January 2022 in an archaeological excavation in the ancient harbour of Berenike, Egypt, by an American-Polish archaeological mission. The statue was discovered in the forecourt of an early Roman period temple dedicated to the Goddess Isis.

The statue, dated around the second century CE, is the earliest statue of the Buddha to ever be found west of Afghanistan. This statue attests to the extent of Indo-Roman relations in the early centuries of the Common Era.

== Origin ==
The Buddha statue was excavated in Berenike, an Egyptian port city on the western shore of the Red Sea. Based on stylistic details and the context of the excavation, researchers thought that the statue was made in Alexandria around the second century CE. According to Steven Sidebotham, a history professor at the University of Delaware who is co-director of the Berenike Project, the statue could date between 90 and 140 CE. It was made from marble that was quarried from the Greek island of Paros and may also have been carved in Berenike itself. The statue has a halo around the head of the Buddha, decorated with the rays of the sun, and has a lotus flower by his side. It is 71 cm (28 in) tall.

The excavations at Berenike also yielded other artifacts related to ancient India: an inscription in Sanskrit dated to the Roman Emperor, Philip the Arab (244 to 249 CE), as well as Satavahana coins dated to the 2nd century CE. They also discovered inscriptions in Greek, including one below the Sanskrit inscription, something Rodney Ast, the researcher from Heidelberg University who discovered the Buddha figure, says is "unique in Egypt."

"It’s probable that the statues were carved in Berenice and, without a doubt, the inscription too. So the place had artisans capable of making those objects and people interested in ordering them," explains Ast, who also points out that the discovery raises new questions. "What does it mean to make an offering of a Buddha statue in a Roman temple to Isis in Egypt? It is a topic that will keep anthropologists, historians and others busy for a while," he says.

The inscription carved in stele found along with the artifact was carved in Greek and Brahmi script. The text contains a Greek rendering of Buddhist greeting, then continues in Sanskrit with the date of the donation pointing to the sixth year of ruling of Philip the Arab, names the founder as kṣatriya Vāsula and includes a merit granting formula "for the benefit and pleasure of all beings". The inscription closes off in Greek with repeated attribution of funding the statue to Vazulas (Greek rendering of the name).

Various fragmentary parts of Buddha statues (torsos, heads) had already been discovered at Berenike in 2019, some made of local gypsum.

== Discovery and archaeological context ==
=== The Berenike project ===
The coordination for the research of this excavation expedition began in 1959 with the University of Warsaw's Polish Centre of Mediterranean Archaeology. Hence, this centre oversees the archaeological investigations at the port of Berenike.

The Berenike port site, which connects the Red Sea to the Mediterranean world, was an important trade nexus for almost 800 years from the 3rd century BCE to the 6th century CE. The excavations at this seaport began in 1994. Archaeologists discovered and noted thousands of artifacts and ecofacts throughout these excavations. These discoveries, eventually including the Berenike Buddha, contribute to the understanding that the port held international commercial and cultural relevance.

Excavations at the Temple of Isis (where the Buddha head was found), in particular, started in 2018. Scholars Rodney Ast and Olaf Kaper were awarded a research grant through the Thyssen Foundation which supported this phase of the project, and archaeologist Steven Sidebotham led the expedition, making it an American and Polish effort.

The fieldwork was constructed in stages. In the winter of 2022, the fieldwork was "concentrated in the Hellenistic hydraulic-bath area (one trench and extensions) and in and around the Roman-era Isis temple (six trenches/areas and extensions)." In 2023, the Buddha statue, which was approximately 71 cm (28 in) in length, was found.

=== Findspot: The Temple of Isis ===
The site where archaeologists discovered the Buddha statue included a temple from the period when Egypt was a province of the Roman Empire. Although the statue was not recovered from the temple, it was still within the complex. Scholar Roger Anis draws attentions to the notability of finding evidence of Buddhist influence or presence (through the statue) in a temple where Isis and Serapis were worshipped.

== Historical context ==
=== Berenice Troglodytica ===
Berenice Troglodytica was an ancient seaport near the coast of the Red Sea.

== See also ==
- Buddhist art
- Buddhism and the Roman world
- Greco-Buddhism
- Greco-Buddhist art
- Indo-Roman relations
- Helgö Buddha
