= Ancient Greece–Ancient India relations =

Relations between ancient Greece and India

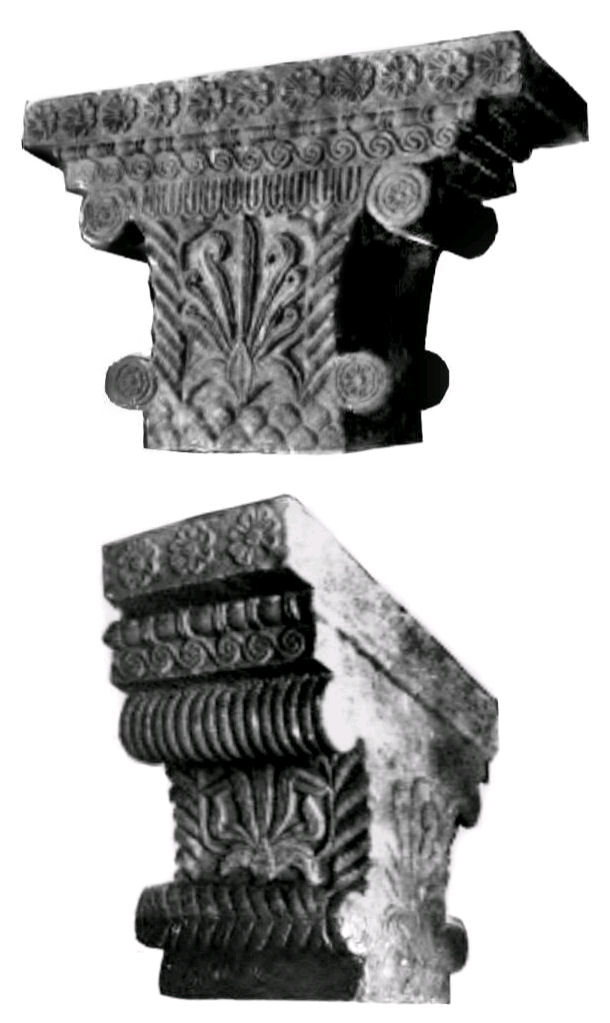
Pataliputra Palace capital, showing Greek and Persian influence, early Mauryan Empire period, 3rd century BC.

For the ancient Greeks, India (Greek: Ἰνδία) referred to the geographical region located east of Persia and south of the Himalayas, excluding Serica. At later points in history, the term also came to refer either to the more extensive Indian subcontinent or to the less extensive Indus Plain.

== Names ==
The Greeks referred to the Indo-Aryans as Indoi (Greek: Ἰνδοί), lit. 'people of the Indus River'. The Vedic Aryans referred to the Greeks as Yavanas, Yona or Yonaka, terms derived from the Ionians. Yawan is a Hebrew term that referred to the ancient Greeks. Inscriptions and Pali texts trace the Prakrit equivalent of the Sanskrit word Yavana as Yona. It has been suggested that the Indians adopted the term either from the Persians—who called the Greeks Yaunas—or from a Semitic language.

Traditional Indian grammarians believed that the word Yavanas was derived from the Sanskrit root Yu ('to mix, to mingle'). The earliest written record of the term Yavana appears in the Astadhyayi, a work on grammar by Pāṇini. When demonstrating the use of the suffix -anuk, he cites Yavanani as one of his examples. In addition, Katyayana explains that when the suffix is added to the word Yavana, it indicates handwriting. Yavanani and Yavanallipyam are examples of scripts used by the Yavana people.

Although originally the word Yavana meant 'Greek', in later centuries it was also applied to Romans, Arabs, and Westerners in general.

== Mythology and legends ==
=== Dionysus ===
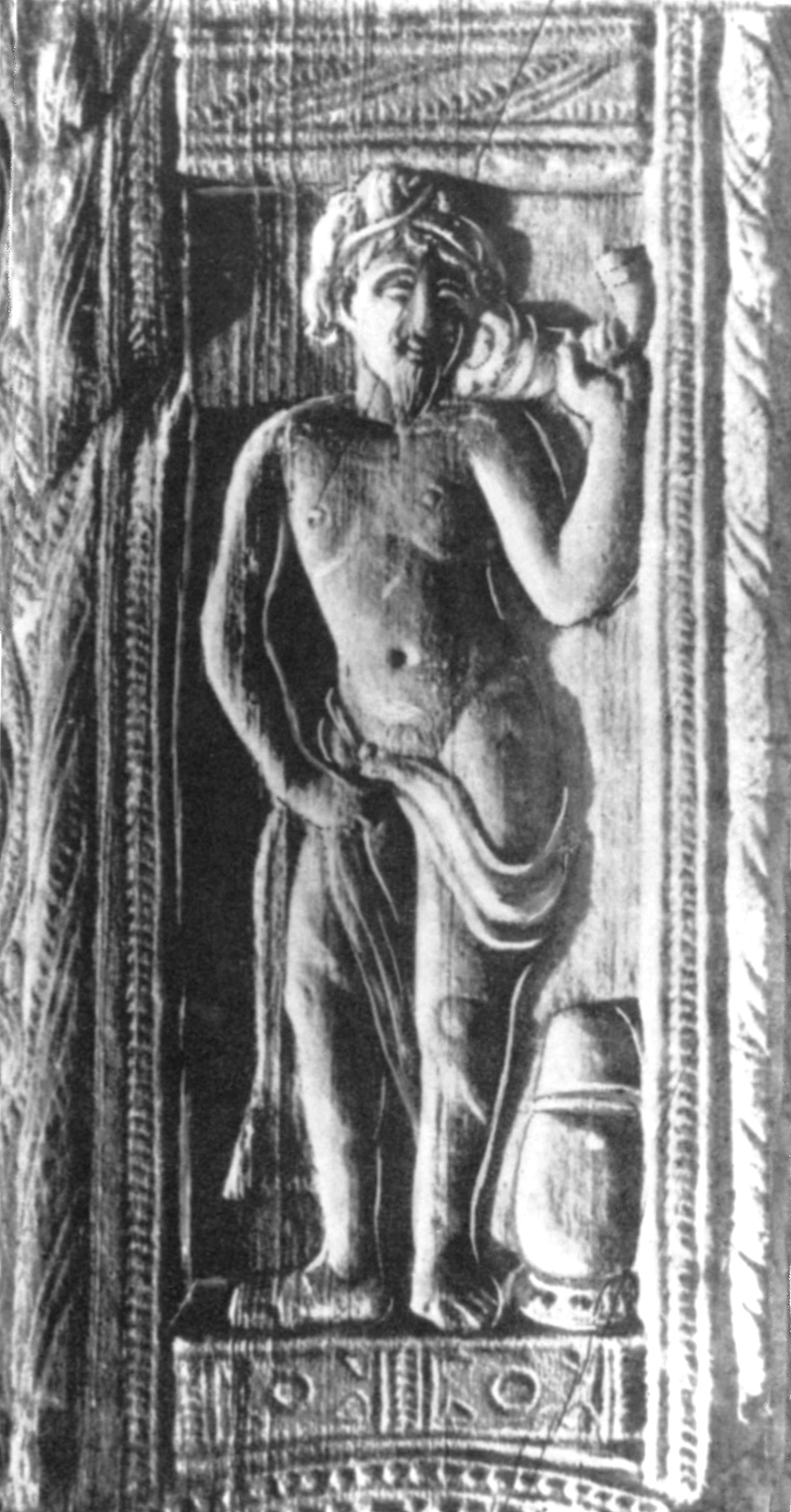
Relief of Dionysus, Nagarjunakonda, Southern India, 3rd century CE.

Megasthenes wrote about the prehistoric arrival of the god Dionysus in India, as did Apollodorus in Bibliotheca. Polyaenus wrote that, after fighting King Deriades, Dionysus subdued the Indians, allied with them and the Amazons, and took them into his service. He later employed them in his campaign against Bactria.

The epic poem Dionysiaca by Nonnus recounts Dionysus' expedition to India. Nonnus also wrote about Colletes (Ancient Greek: 'Κολλήτης'), a huge, formidable figure, whose ancestor was said to be the founder of the Indian race. In addition, in Book 14, Hera assumes the likeness of an Indian in order to speak with and persuade the Indian chief to fight Dionysus' army.

A hymn to Dionysus in the Greek Anthology is titled Dionysus Indoletes ('Ἰνδολέτης'), which means 'slayer' or 'killer of Indians'. Other poems in the Greek Anthology also mention Dionysus' campaign against the Indians. Alphesiboea ('Ἀλφεσιβοῖα') was an Indian nymph who was loved by Dionysus.

Philostratus reports that Dionysus was called Nysian or Nysean (Ancient Greek: 'Νύσιος') by the Indians. According to legend, he founded the city of Nysa, sometimes identified with Nagara. When Alexander the Great arrived in Nysa, representatives of the city met him and asked him not to capture the city or its land, explaining that Dionysus had founded it and named it after his nurse. He had also named the mountain near the city Meron (Ancient Greek: 'Μηρόν'), meaning 'thigh', because Dionysus grew in the thigh of Zeus. In addition, Philostratus mentions that at Delphi, a silver offering disc bore the inscription 'Dionysus the son of Semele and Zeus, from the men of India to the Apollo of Delphi' (Ancient Greek: 'ΔΙΟΝΥΣΟΣ Ο ΣΕΜΕΛΗΣ ΚΑΙ ΔΙΟΣ ΑΠΟ ΙΝΔΩΝ ΑΠΟΛΛΩΝΙ ΔΕΛΦΩΙ'). Furthermore, he reports that the Indians living in Caucasus and along the river Cophen said that Dionysus was an Assyrian visitor who knew the religious rites of the city of Thebes in Greece (according to Ancient Greek legend, Dionysus was born there).

In Argonautica, Apollonius Rhodius wrote about the Nysean son of Zeus, who left the tribes of the Indians and came to dwell at Thebes. Indians inhabiting the district between the Indus and the Hydraotes and the continental region extending up to the river Ganges declared that Dionysus was the son of the river Indus and that Dionysus of Thebes was his disciple. Phylarchus wrote that Dionysus was the first to bring two bulls, named Apis and Osiris, from India to Egypt; Plutarch found this theory absurd.

=== Heracles ===
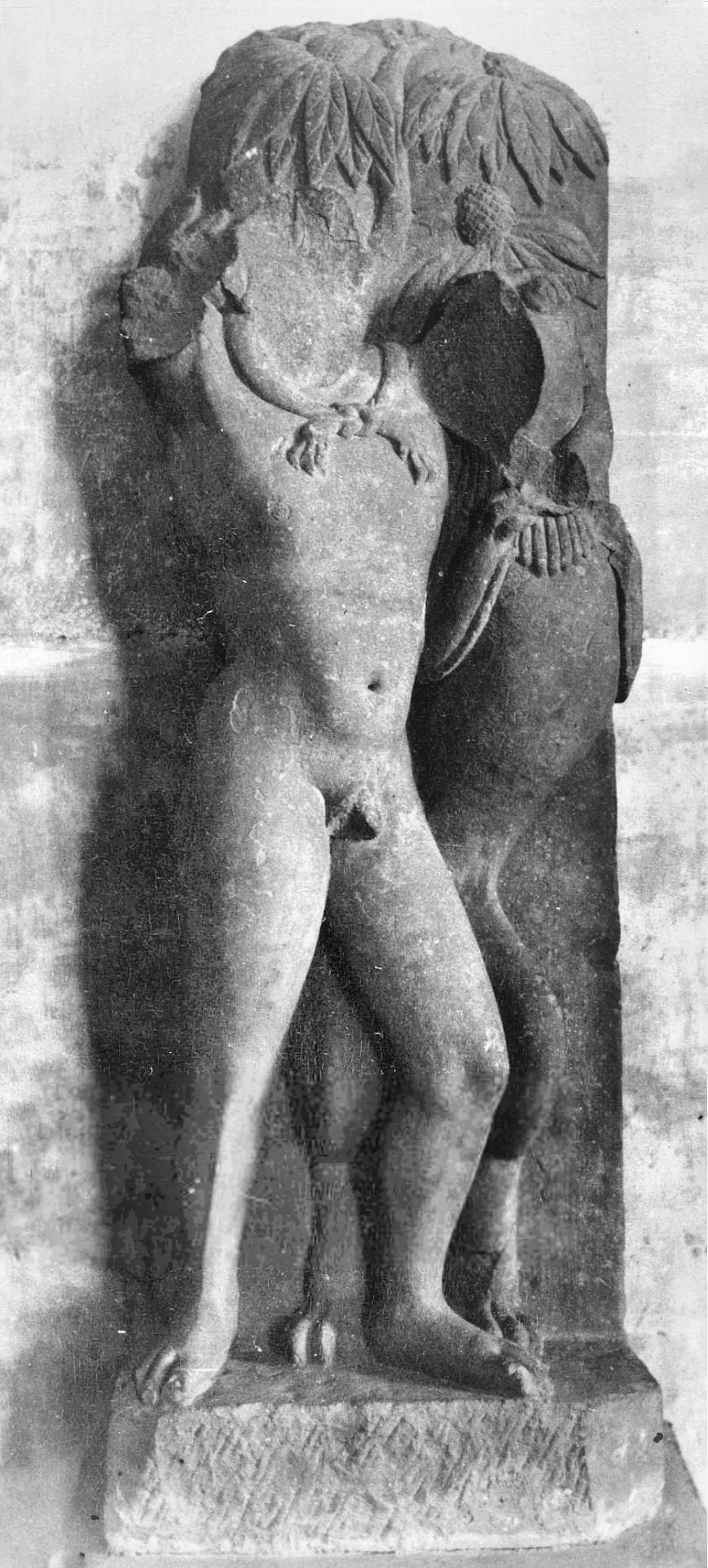
Mathura Herakles strangling the Nemaean lion, Mathura, India.

Megasthenes also wrote about the legendary arrival of Heracles in India. Pandaie (Ancient Greek: 'Πανδαίη') was a daughter of Heracles, whom he fathered in India. He gave her the southern part of India, where she reigned as queen. According to legend, the Indian tribe of Pandae was descended from her, and for this reason, they were the only tribe in India to have the custom of female sovereigns. An Indian tribe called the Sourasenoi worshipped Heracles at the time of Alexander the Great. Quintus Curtius Rufus mentions Indian soldiers carrying a banner with the name 'Herakles' during Alexander's push eastwards.

== Contact, records, and influence between the two civilizations ==
=== Coinage ===
Between about 200 BC and the very beginning of the first millennium AD, the Indo-Greek Kingdom covered an area encompassing modern-day Pakistan, parts of Afghanistan and of north-west India. The city of Kapisi appeared on Indo-Greek coins.

The Kushan Empire, which succeeded the Indo-Greek Kingdom and lasted nearly four hundred years, used the Greek alphabet and Greek legends on their coins. The Kushans also adopted other elements of Greek culture. Art themes derived from Greek mythology were common initially, but later Buddhist imagery dominated. In broadly the same era and south of the Kushan Empire, the Western Kshatrapas established coinage derived from Indo-Greek coinage. The obverse of the coins consists of the profile of the ruler with a legend in Greek, while the reverse represents a thunderbolt and an arrow, with Brahmi and Kharoshthi legends. In the first century CE, Gondophares, king of the Indo-Parthian Kingdom, minted coins with the Greek title of autokrator.

=== Inscriptions ===
Greeks are mentioned in the Yavanarajya inscription in northern India, and on the Rukhuna reliquary. In a Kharoshthi inscription found in the Swat area of Gandhara, which dates to the 1st century BC, there is a dedication from the Greek meridarch Theodorus. The Rabatak inscription uses Greek script to write a language described as Arya. The inscription relates to the rule of the Kushan emperor Kanishka.

=== Art and literature ===
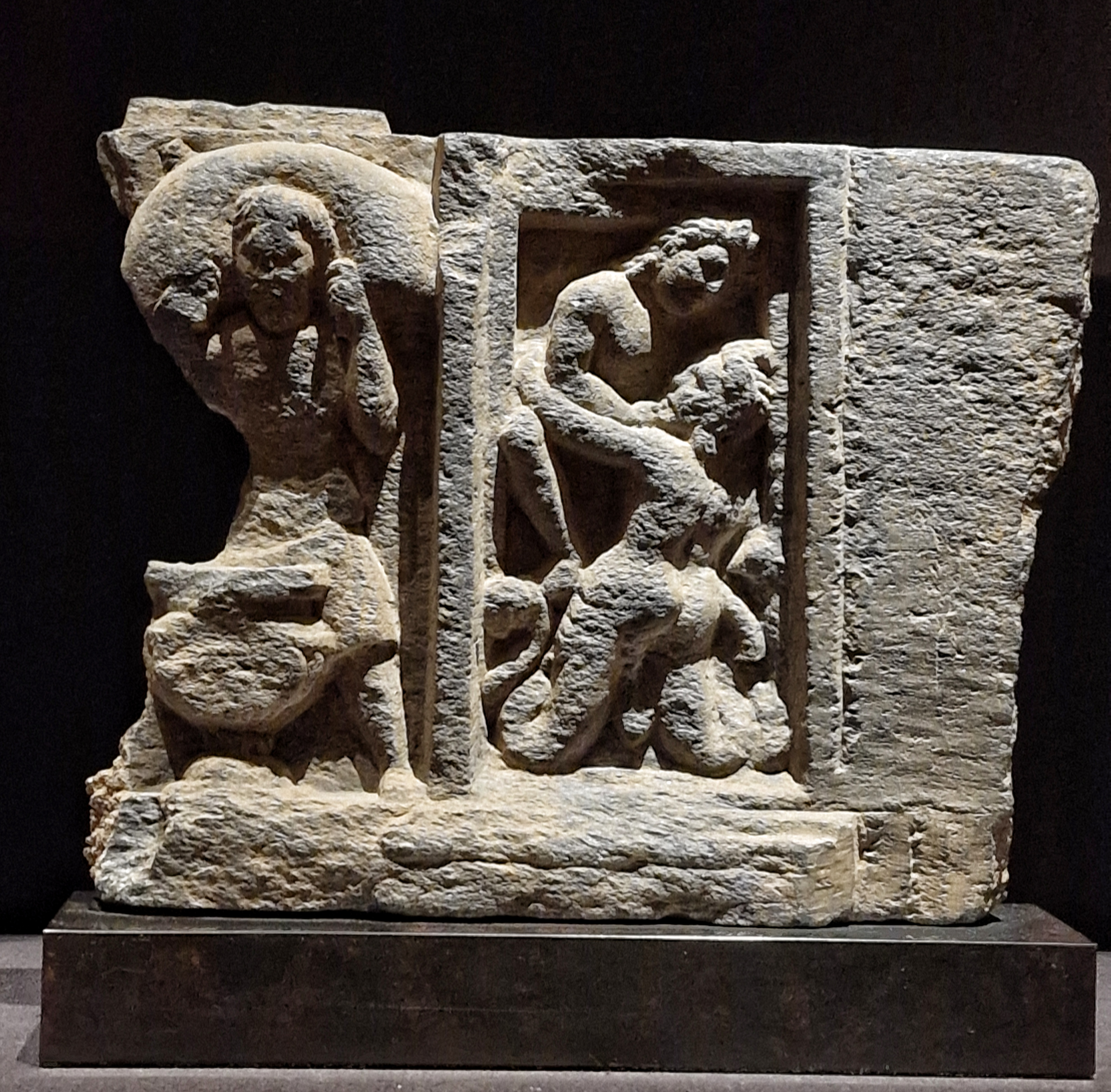
Some of the iconography and motifs of Gandharan art reveal its influences from the Greek art. The Greek god Triton; the Dionysian motif of youth holding a leather pouch filled with wine; or cupids bearing garlands of flowers. From 2nd-3rd century, now in National Museum of Korea.

In the Greek Anthology, India and Indians are mentioned on many occasions. In Sophocles' play Antigone, Creon mentions the gold of India. The satirist Lucian wrote that Indians get drunk with wine very easily and worse than any Greek or Roman would be.

Kalidasa mentions the Yayanis (Greek maidens) in his work and the Yavana Ganika (Greek Ganika) was a common sight in India (Gaṇikā in India was similar to a Hetaira in the Greek world). These girls were also trained in the theatrical arts. The Indian theater had adopted some elements of Greek comedy.

Hellenistic influence on Indian art is well documented. Gandhara art was heavily influenced by the Greek style. The art of Mathura is a blend of Indian and Greek art. The Pompeii Yakshii, an Indian sculpture of a Yakshii, was found in the ruins of Roman Pompeii. Bharhut Yavana is a relief, discovered among the reliefs of the railings around the Bharhut Stupa, representing a Greek warrior.

At the Nasik Caves, some of the caves were built by people with Greek heritage. The murals in the Ajanta Caves are painted in a way which suggests a Greek influence.

=== Philosophy and religion ===
==== Pyrrhonism ====
The philosopher Pyrrho accompanied Alexander the Great on his Indian campaign. According to Diogenes Laërtius, Pyrrho developed his philosophy, now known as Pyrrhonism, in India. Diogenes Laërtius wrote that Anaxarchus, Pyrrho's teacher, met and spoke with Indian gymnosophists and magi. In the view of Christopher I. Beckwith, Pyrrho's philosophy was strikingly similar to the Buddhist three marks of existence, suggesting that his teaching was influenced by contact with Buddhism.

Because of the high degree of similarity between Nāgārjuna's philosophy and Pyrrhonism, particularly the surviving works of Sextus Empiricus, Nāgārjuna was likely influenced by Greek Pyrrhonist texts imported to India.

==== Buddhism ====
Buddhism flourished under the Indo-Greeks, leading to the Greco-Buddhist cultural syncretism. The iconography of Vajrapani is clearly that of the hero Heracles, with varying degrees of hybridization. Menander I was one of the patrons of Buddhism; he was also the subject of the Milinda Panha and is mentioned on the Shinkot casket. It has been claimed (by G. R. Sharma) that Menander is mentioned in the Reh Inscription, but other scholars disagree. Many Greek rulers after Menander had the description "Maharajasa dhramikasa" (follower of the Dharma) next to their name on their coinage; this does not necessarily imply that they were Buddhists or that Buddhism was dominant in their kingdom, as symbols of the Greek religion were also on the same coins, but it does indicate that Buddhism played a significant role.

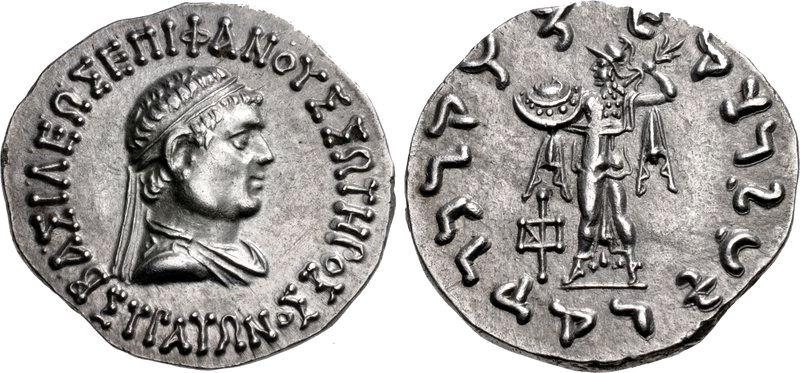
Coin of Strato I. Obv. Bust of Strato. Greek legend: ΒΑΣΙΛΕΩΣ ΣΩΤΗΡΟΣ ΚΑΙ ΔΙΚΑΙΟΥ ΣΤΡΑΤΩΝΟΣ "of king saviour and just/ righteous Strato". Rev. Athena throwing thunderbolt. Pali legend: Maharajasa tratarasa Dhramikasa Stratasa "Great saviour king Strato, follower of the Dharma".

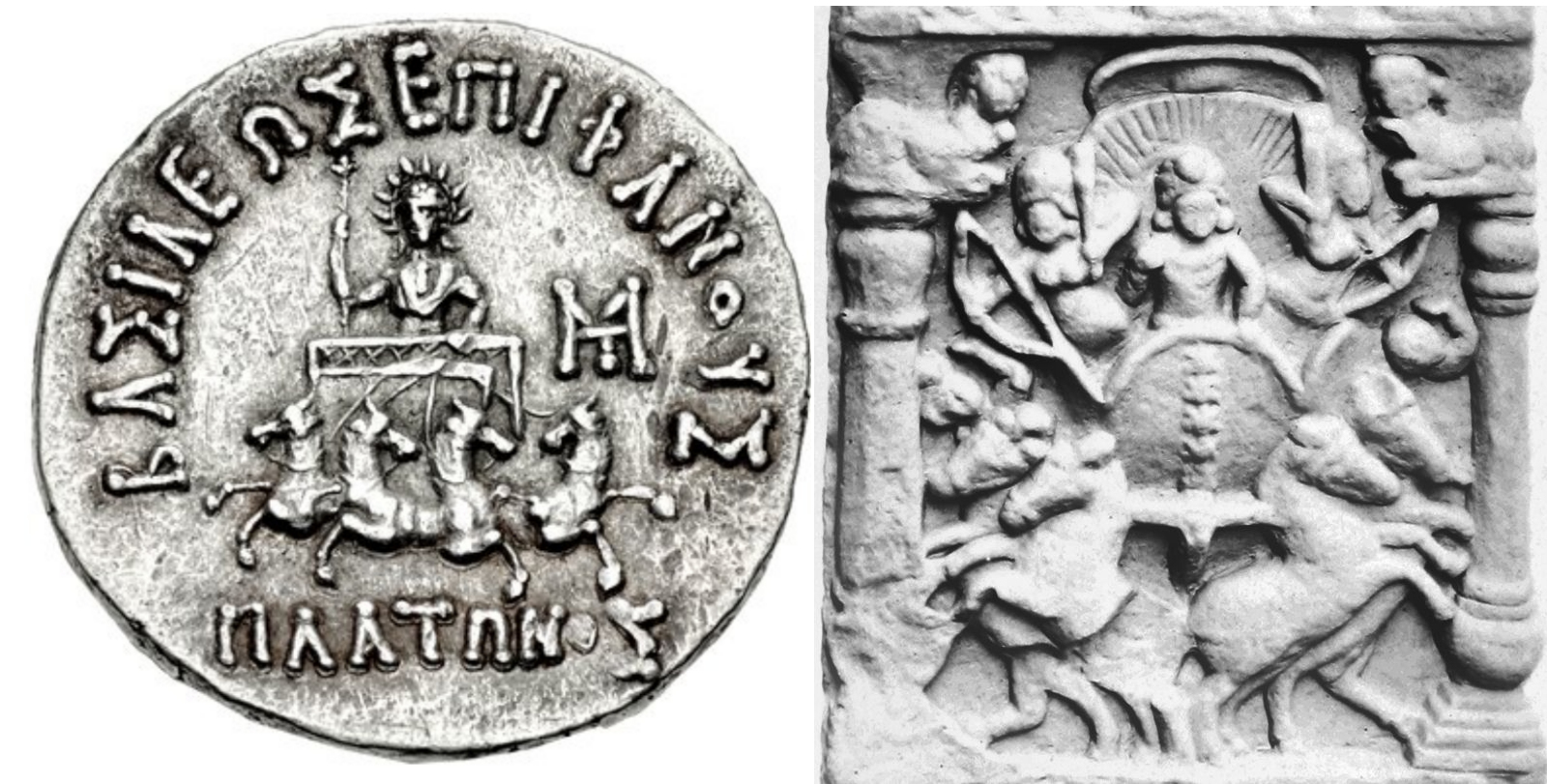
Coin of Plato of Bactria with the god Helios (left) and sculpture of Surya at Bodh Gaya (right).

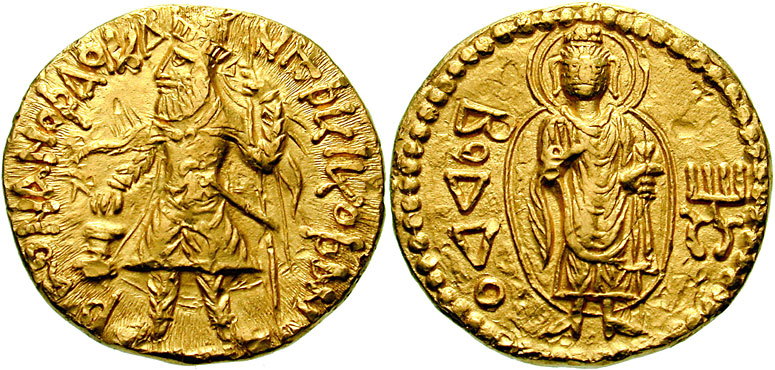
Kanishka coin with Greek lettering "ΒΟΔΔΟ" (i.e. Buddha), Kushan Empire, 2nd century CE.

Dharmaraksita was a Greek who converted to Buddhism. He was one of the missionaries sent by the Mauryan emperor Ashoka to proselytize Buddhism. Mahadharmaraksita was a Greek Buddhist master who, according to Mahāvaṃsa traveled to Anuradhapura in Sri Lanka together with 30,000 Greek Buddhist monks from Alexandria of the Caucasus. Mahāvaṃsa also mentions how early Buddhists from Sri Lanka went to Alexandria of the Caucasus to learn Buddhism.

The Kandahar Greek Edicts of Ashoka, which are among Ashoka's Major Rock Edicts, were written in the Greek and Prakrit languages. In addition, the Kandahar Bilingual Rock Inscription was written in Greek and Aramaic. The emperor Ashoka used the word "eusebeia" (piety) as a Greek translation for the central Buddhist and Hindu concept of "dharma" in the Kandahar Bilingual Rock Inscription.

Buddhist gravestones from Ptolemaic Egypt have been found in Alexandria decorated with depictions of the dharma wheel, showing the presence of Buddhists in Hellenistic Egypt. Ptolemy II Philadelphus is mentioned in the Edicts of Ashoka as a recipient of the Buddhist proselytism of Ashoka:

Now it is conquest by Dhamma that Beloved-Servant-of-the-Gods considers to be the best conquest. And it [conquest by Dhamma] has been won here, on the borders, even six hundred yojanas away, where the Greek king Antiochos rules, beyond there where the four kings named Ptolemy, Antigonos, Magas and Alexander rule, likewise in the south among the Cholas, the Pandyas, and as far as Tamraparni. Rock Edict Nb13 (S. Dhammika)

==== Peripateticism ====
Aristotle's knowledge of India came essentially from Scylax and Ctesias. He quoted Scylax to refer to Indian politics and mentions seven Indian animals, by clearly drawing on Ctesias.

The Peripatetic philosopher Clearchus of Soli traveled to the east to study Indian religions.

Another Peripatetic philosopher, Theophrastus, in his book on the history of plants, wrote an excursus on Indian species. Also, in his work "On Stones," he describes rocks, stones and gems produced in India.

Peripatetic philosopher Aristocles of Messene (cited by the Christian polemicist Eusebius) said an Indian conversed with Socrates in Athens.

And Aristoxenus the musician said that this argument comes from the Indians. For a man of that people met Socrates in Athens and asked him what his philosophy was about; and when he said that he was investigating human life, the Indian laughed at him, saying that no one could understand human affairs if he ignored the divine. Whether this is true, no one can say for sure.

==== Christian ====
Clement of Alexandria wrote about India, Gymnosophists, Brahmans, Buddha, etc. in the Stromata.

The Greek theologian Pantaenus was said to have traveled to India.

==== Sophism ====
The Greek Sophist Philostratus, in his work Life of Apollonius of Tyana (Greek: Βίος Απολλωνίου του Τυανέως) and the Suda, mentioned that the Greek philosopher Apollonius had traveled to India.

The Sophist Dio Chrysostom mentioned India in his work Discourses and wrote that Homer's poetry is sung in India. He also mentioned that Bactrians and Indians were to be found in his audience in Alexandria (circa 100 CE).

=== Political and military ===
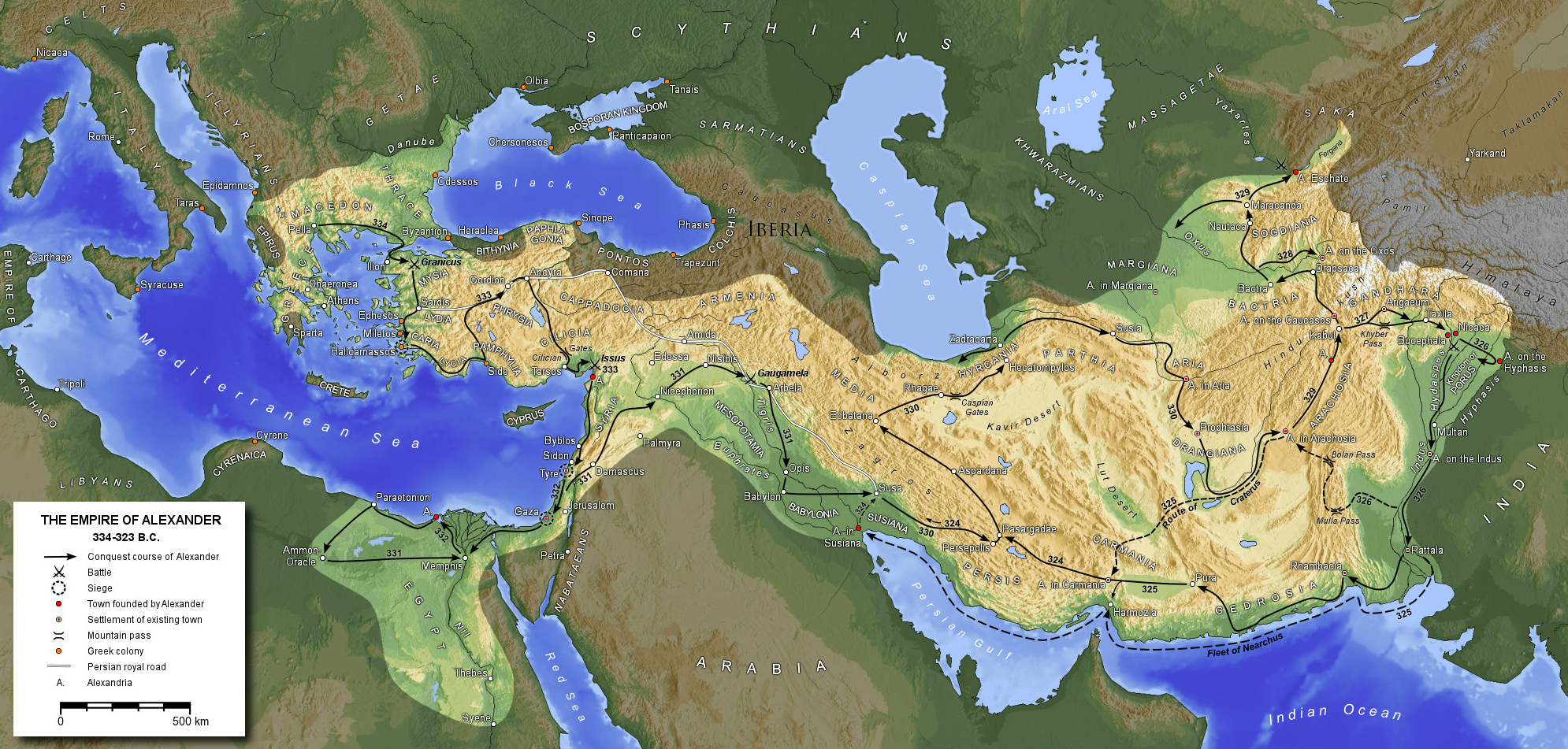
Map of Alexander the Great's empire and the route he, Pyrrho, Anaxarchus, and Onesicritus took to India.

During the second Persian invasion of Greece, the Persian army had Indian troops, both infantry and cavalry.

At the Battle of Gaugamela, Darius used Indian troops against Alexander the Great. Later, during the Indian campaign of Alexander the Great, Alexander's army fought many battles against Indian tribes and kingdoms, including against the army of Porus the Elder. Plutarch wrote about the battle in his work Parallel Lives, "The Life of Alexander." The Indian King Ambhi (the Greeks called him Taxiles) supported Alexander with his forces. Philostratus the Elder in the Life of Apollonius of Tyana wrote that in the army of Porus there was an elephant who fought bravely against Alexander's army, and Alexander dedicated it to the Helios (Sun) and named it "Ajax" because he thought that such a so great animal deserved a great name. The elephant had gold rings around its tusks and an inscription was on them written in Greek: "Alexander the son of Zeus dedicates Ajax to the Helios" (ΑΛΕΞΑΝΔΡΟΣ Ο ΔΙΟΣ ΤΟΝ ΑΙΑΝΤΑ ΤΩΙ ΗΛΙΩΙ). Alexander also met and talked with Indian gymnosophists, including Dandamis and Kalanos.

Alexander let Taxiles and Porus keep their kingdoms and added Paropamisadae to the kingdom of Oxyartes. In addition, he gave Peithon and Philip Indian satrapies. The Indian king Abisares who sent embassies of submission to Alexander was allowed to retain his kingdom with considerable additions.

Alexander also conquered the kingdom of the Indian king Phegeus. The inhabitants welcomed Alexander's army and the king met Alexander and gave him many gifts. He also conquered the city of Sagala.

Alexander asked Phegeus and Porus what was after the Hyphasis River and after their response he decided to continue. He was preparing to march against the Indian King Xandrames, before his army mutinied. After the mutiny of his army, he conducted the Mallian campaign.

After he conquered the Oritians and Arabitians, Alexander made Apollophanes the Satrap in the area.

According to ancient writers, the Queen Cleophis of Massaga had a son with Alexander the Great. Modern historians deny this.

After the Battle of Gabiene, Antigonus I Monophthalmus sent the Argyraspides to Sibyrtius at Arachosia.

Indo-Greek kingdoms and Greco-Bactrian Kingdoms were founded by the successors of Alexander the Great (Greek conquests in India). Yavana era describes the period with Greek presence in India.

According to Indian sources, Greek troops seem to have assisted Chandragupta Maurya in toppling the Nanda Dynasty and founding the Mauryan Empire. Later, Seleucus I's army encountered Chandragupta's army. Chandragupta and Seleucus eventually concluded an alliance. Seleucus gave him his daughter in marriage, ceded the territories of Arachosia, Herat, Kabul and Makran, and received 500 war elephants.

Megasthenes had traveled to India and had several interviews with Chandragupta Maurya, known as Sandracottus to the Greeks.

Bindusara, the second Mauryan emperor of India, had diplomatic relations with and very friendly feelings towards the Greeks. He even asked Antiochus I Soter to send him a Greek sophist for his court.

Ptolemy II Philadelphus is recorded by Pliny the Elder as having sent an ambassador named Dionysius to the Mauryan court at Pataliputra in India, probably to Emperor Ashoka:

"But [India] has been treated of by several other Greek writers who resided at the courts of Indian kings, such, for instance, as Megasthenes, and by Dionysius, who was sent thither by Philadelphus expressly for the purpose: all of whom have enlarged upon the power and vast resources of these nations." Pliny the Elder, "The Natural History", Chap. 21

Asoka also appointed some Greeks to high offices of state (Yavanaraja, meaning Greek King or Governor), for example, the Tushaspha. In addition, his edicts mention a Yona (Greek) province on the north-west border of India, most probably Arachosia.

Polybius wrote about the use of Indian elephants in battles and about the alliance between the Indian king Sophagasenus and Antiochus III the Great.

Diodorus, quoting Iambulus, mentioned that the king of Pataliputra had a "great love for the Greeks".

The Greek historian Apollodorus and the Roman historian Justin affirmed that the Bactrian Greeks conquered India. Justin also described Demetrius I as "King of the Indians". Greek and Indian sources indicate the Greeks campaigned as far as Pataliputra until they were forced to retreat following a coup in Bactria in 170 BC.

The Heliodorus pillar is a stone column erected around 110 BCE in present-day central India in Vidisha, by Heliodorus (Greek: Ἡλιόδωρος), a Greek ambassador of the Indo-Greek king Antialcidas to the court of the Shunga king Bhagabhadra. The site is located about 5 miles from the Buddhist stupa of Sanchi.

The King Phraotes received a Greek education at the court of his father and spoke Greek fluently.

Stephanus of Byzantium called the city Daedala in India an Indo-Cretan city, most probably because it was a settlement of Cretan mercenaries.

Tamil poems describe the Greek soldiers who served as mercenaries for Indian kings as "the valiant-eyed Yavanas, whose bodies were strong and of terrible aspect".

Alfred Charles Auguste Foucher has posited that some of the troops of Mara in the Gandhara sculptures may represent Greek mercenaries.

The Cilappatikaram mentions Yavana soldiers, which, according to scholars, including Professor Dikshitar, is a reference to the Greek mercenaries employed by the Tamil kings.

Patanjali, the commentator of Pāṇini, describes two sieges the Greeks made: the siege of Saketa and the siege of Madhyamika.

Eratosthenes believed that humanity should not be divided into Greeks and Barbarians. Instead, people should be judged according to their virtues and vices, regardless of their origins. He points out that many Greeks were morally worthless, while numerous Barbarians, such as the Indians and Ariani, were highly civilized.

=== Trade ===
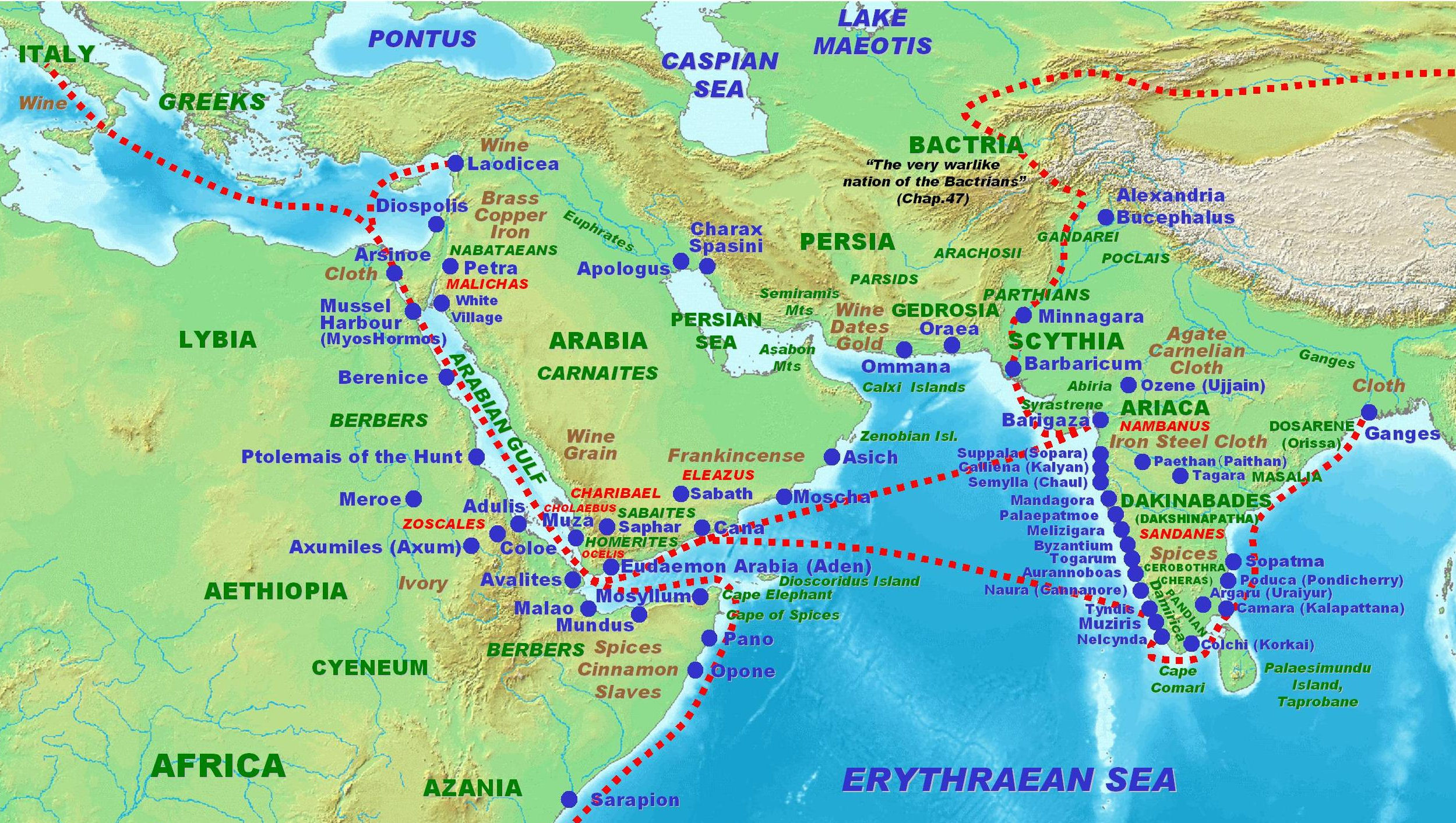
Roman trade in the subcontinent according to the Periplus Maris Erythraei 1st century CE.

Ptolemy II Philadelphus founded the Myos Hormos and selected it as the principal harbour of the trade with India, in preference to Arsinoe, since Arsinoe was at the head of the Red Sea and navigation down the Heroopolite Gulf was tedious and difficult. Vessels from Myos Hormos traded with Africa, Arabia, and India.

During the Roman and Byzantine period there were trade relations between India and the Roman Empire.

Isidore of Charax in his work The Parthian Stations (Ancient Greek: Σταθμοί Παρθικοί) described the trade route between the Levant and India in the 1st century BC.

The so-called Muziris papyrus, written in Greek, contains crucial information regarding the cargo of a ship named the Hermapollon that sailed back to Egypt from Muziris in India. Muziris is also mentioned in the Periplus of the Erythraean Sea as one of the Indian ports Greek ships were sailing to. Other Indian ports Greek merchants visited were Barygaza, Barbarikon, Minnagara, Ujjain and Ariaca.

Tacola (Τάκωλα) was a place on the west coast of the Aurea Chersonesus, in India extra Gangem, which Ptolemy calls an emporium.

The Periplus of the Erythraean Sea was a manual written in Greek for navigators who carried trade between the Roman Empire and other regions, including ancient India. It gives detailed information about the ports, routes and commodities.

Ancient Greek and Roman writers also describe the ports of the Arabia Felix, which were used for the Indian trade.

Procopius writes that, when the Byzantines didn't want to purchase their silk from the Persians any longer due to their conflicts, some monks coming from India, who had also spent a long time in a country called Serinda (Ancient Greek: Σηρίνδα) which was beyond India, talked with the Emperor Justinian and promised to settle the silk question. Thus, the Byzantines would not need to buy silk from the Persians.

Chanakya mentioned Greeks and their polities in his Arthashastra.

Athenaeus in the Deipnosophistae wrote that Euthydemus the Athenian in his book on Vegetables calls a species of gourd the Indian gourd (σικύαν Ἰνδικὴν) because the seed of that gourd was originally introduced from India.

After Alexander's time, there were trade relations between the Greek world and Sri Lanka. Ancient writers describe in details what was traded. Cosmas Indicopleustes wrote about a specific Greek merchant named ‘Sopatrus’ who had a trade relationship with Sri Lanka. At the Jaffna Peninsula, archaeologists discovered gold coins with Greek inscriptions, most probably belonging to the Byzantine period.

=== Travelers and explorers ===
Pompeii Yakshii (Lakshmi)
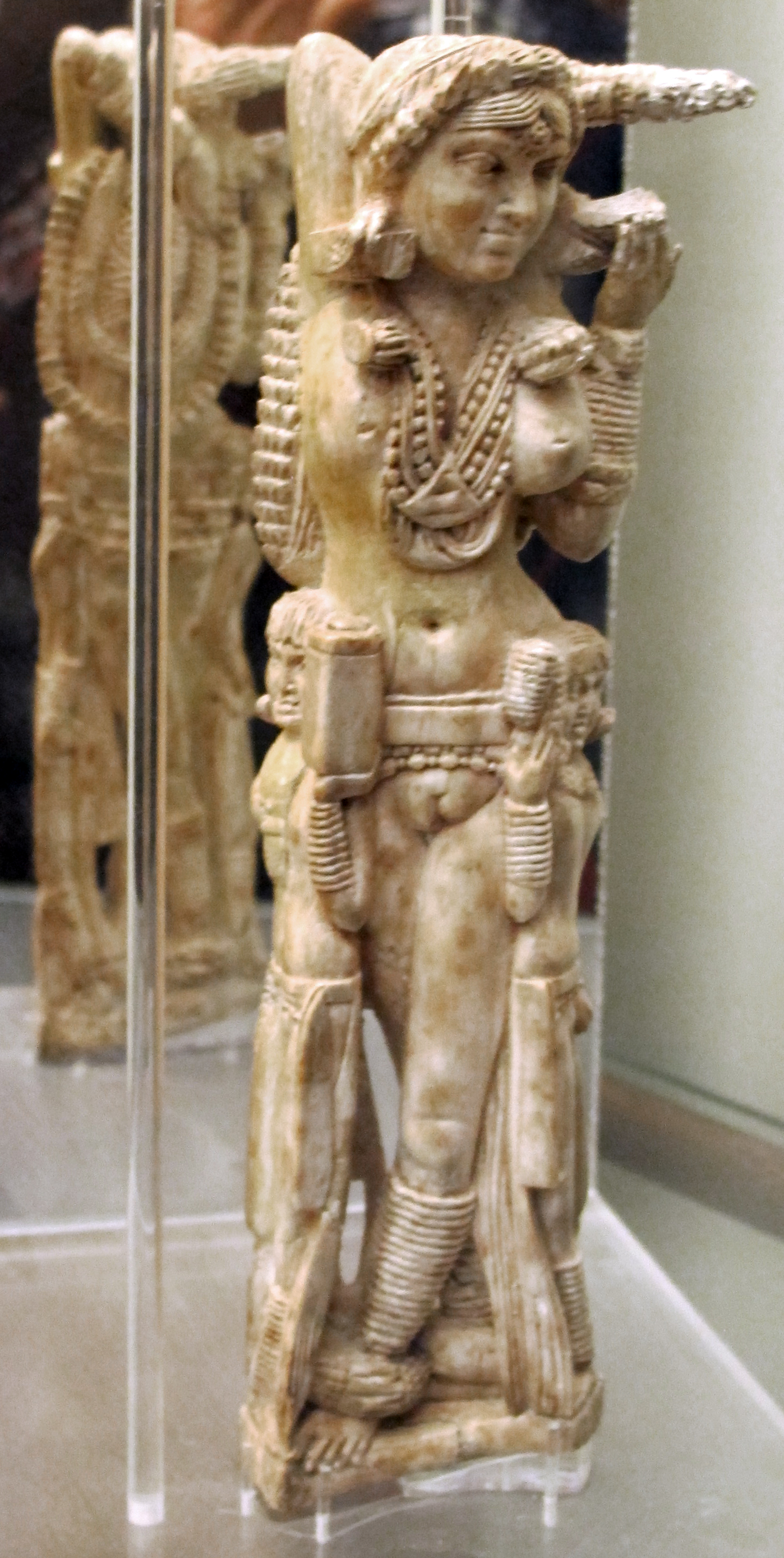
- An ivory statuette of a Yakshii (1st century CE), found in the ruins of Pompeii (destroyed in an eruption of Mount Vesuvius in 79 CE).
- Material: Ivory
- Height: 24.5 cm (9 1/2 in)
- Discovered: c. 1930–1938; Pompeii
- Present location: Secret Museum, Naples, Italy
- Identification: 149425

The Greek historian Herodotus in the fifth century BCE was aware of dark-skinned people who lived far to the east, whom the Greeks named Aethiopes, although Greek beliefs seem to have been confused by conflating African and Indian characteristics and peoples. Ancient Greek knowledge of and interest in India hugely increased following the conquests of Alexander the Great and his campaign in northern India between 327–25 BCE.

==== Classical period ====
Fragments of the writings of Hecataeus of Miletus (549–486 BCE) convey a knowledge of nations living on the banks of the river Indus, using names for them including Indi, Indus, Argante and the people of Opia. Herodotus records that the Greek explorer Scylax, in about 515 BCE, was sent by King Darius I of Persia to follow the course of the Indus River and discover where it led. Writings attributed to Scylax, however, have been shown to have been written much later, in the fourth century BCE. No mention of India can be found in any of the works of Homer, Pinder or the Athenian playwrights.

==== Hellenistic period ====
Things changed dramatically near the end of the fourth century BCE, after the conquests of Alexander the Great. Nearchus, an officer in the army of Alexander who probably wrote his memoirs near the very end of the fourth century BCE, described India and the people living there. Onecicritus of Astypaleia, who was a captain of Alexander's navy, wrote about Sri Lanka.

The Greek ethnographer and explorer of the Hellenistic period, Megasthenes was a Macedonian ambassador sent by Seleucus I to the courts of Sandrocottus (Chandragupta) who ruled an area in northern India that lay north of the river Ganges. In his work, Indika (Greek: Ινδικά), he wrote about the history of Indians and their culture. Megasthenes also mentioned the prehistoric arrival of the god Dionysus and Herakles (Megasthenes' Herakles) in India. Some years later, Deimachus, who was an ambassador to the court of Bindusara, also wrote about India.

Patrocles was an admiral of Seleucus who sailed into the Indian Ocean and left an account of his travels, confirming Megasthenes' estimate of the breadth of India. His knowledge of the eastern seaboard of India was in error, however, believing that sea encircled the Indian subcontinent, linking the Indian Ocean with the Caspian Sea. We know all this from the surviving works of the Greek historian Strabo, who was active in the first century BCE. He did not trust previous writings about India because he believed they included a lot of fables in their writings, especially the recountings of Deimachus and Megasthenes, while Onesicritus and Nearchus together with some others wrote "a few words of truth," in his view. On the other hand, he trusted the works of Patrocles and Eratosthenes.

Eudoxus of Cyzicus, near the end of the second century BCE, and Hippalus, who was possibly associated with Eudoxus, traveled to India with their ships. Hippalus is credited by the writer of the 1st-century CE Periplus of the Erythraean Sea with establishing currents, winds and a route to use for trade with stopping points along the coast of India between the Red Sea and the very south of India.

Caemaron (Καιμάρων) was a Greek author, probably of the Hellenistic period, who composed a multi-book work entitled Indika. The work is now lost and survives only in fragments preserved by later writers.

==== Roman period ====
In the first century BCE, the naked Indian philosopher and monk Zarmanochegas (possibly, but not necessarily, a Buddhist) met Nicholas of Damascus in Antioch and later he also traveled to Athens, where he burned himself to death in 19 BCE. According to Plutarch, writing near the end of the first century CE or the beginning of the second, his tomb could still be seen in Athens.

Claudius Ptolemy, in the second century CE, mentions in his work a Greek captain named Diogenes, who was returning from his trip to India when the winds blew him off course and he had to stop below the Horn of Africa. Since the winds were not favorable to travel north, he traveled south and explored the east coast of Africa where he found the city of Rhapta. According to Ptolemy, this happened during the second trip of Diogenes to India.

==== Christian period ====
The Suda, a 10th-century Byzantine encyclopedia, mentioned that when Theophilos the Indian returned from India, he spent time in Antioch and the Emperor Constantius II treated him with all honor and respect.

Sozomen wrote that Meropius (Μερόπιός), a philosopher of Tyre, traveled together with two of his relatives, Frumentius (Φρουμέντιός) and Edesius (Ἐδέσιος) to India.

The Christian Topography by Cosmas Indicopleustes was an essay in scientific geography written in Greek with illustrations and maps. The work mentioned India, and the writer Cosmas Indicopleustes had actually made the journey, and he described and sketched some of what he saw in his topography. Cosmas Indicopleustes means "Cosmas who sailed to India".

Palladius of Galatia wrote a work on India entitled On the Nations of India and the Brahmans (περὶ τῶν τῆς Ἰνδίας ἐθνῶν καὶ τῶν Βραγμάνων). In it, Palladius states that he reached only the promontories of India during a journey he undertook with Moses, the bishop of Adulis. He explains that they did not reach the distant region where the Brahmans lived, which he describes as lying far.

=== Cities and places ===
Around 510 BCE, Persians, under the rule of Darius the Great moved the inhabitants of the Greek colony of Barca in Libya into Bactria. Later, Xerxes I also settled there with the "Branchidae," who were the descendants of Greek priests who had once lived at Didyma. Herodotus also records Persian generals threatening to enslave daughters of the revolting Ionians and send them to Bactria if they didn't stop fighting.

According to legend the god Dionysus founded the city of Nysa and named it Nysa and the land Nysaea (Νυσαία) after his nurse and he named the mountain near the city, Meron (Μηρὸν) (i.e. thigh), because he grew in the thigh of Zeus. When Alexander arrived at the city, he and his Companion cavalry went to the mountain, where they made ivy garlands and crowned themselves with them, singing hymns in honor of Dionysus. Alexander also offered sacrifices to Dionysus, and feasted in company with his companions.

Alexander the Great founded the cities of Nicaea and Alexandria Bucephalous. He also founded a city and named it after his dog, Peritas. In addition, he ordered Philip to build Alexandria on the Indus. He also founded other cities in India. Quintus Curtius Rufus wrote that Alexander founded a number of cities in the Indus Delta, but most probably he meant some garrisons. Claudius Aelianus wrote that there were Macedonians who settled in India in the cities founded by Alexander.

Pliny the Elder wrote that Nearchus founded the town of Arbis during his voyage to India.

The ancient Greeks called the modern Bay of Bengal Gangeticus Sinus (Ancient Greek: Κόλπος Γαγγητικός), meaning "Gulf of the Ganges".

According to Ptolemy, many Greek cities were founded by the Greco-Bactrians in northern India. The cities of Sirkap and Demetriapolis were founded by Demetrius I of Bactria.

Eucratideia was founded by Eucratides I.

Panchaia was an island paradise located in the Indian Ocean mentioned by Greek writers.

Contacossyla (Κοντακόσσυλα) and Allosygna were emporia in the district of Maesolia (Μαισωλία or Μασαλία) (modern Masulipatam).

Maliarpha (Μαλιάρφα,) was a place of considerable commerce in the territory of the Arvarni.

Stephanus of Byzantium wrote about a city called Daedala or Daidala (Ancient Greek: Δαίδαλα) in India, which he called an Indo-Cretan city, most probably because it was a settlement of Cretan mercenaries.Stephanus also described many other Indian cities and places.

The Greeks called the Punjab region Pentapotamía (Greek: Πενταποταμία), meaning five rivers.

Caspeiria (Κασπειρία) was a district of India intra Gangem with Ptolemy naming 18 cities there, including the Caspeira (Κάσπειρα) and the Rarassa (Ῥαράσσα or Ἠράρασα).

Caspatyrus (Κασπάτυρος) or Caspapyrus (Κασπάπυρος) was a city in the district of Pactyice.

Calinipaxa was a city in India made known to the Greeks by the expedition of Seleucus I Nicator.

Gange (Γάγγη), according to Ptolemy, was the capital of the Gangaridae, at the mouth of the Ganges river. While Strabo speaks of a town with a similar name but places it far up the river, in the vicinity of Palibothra or Patna. Periplus of the Erythraean Sea mention a city called Ganges (Γάγγης).

The Greeks called the Eastern Himalayas in the district of India intra Gangem Damassi Montes/Mountains (τὰ Δάμασσα ὄρη).

The Saurashtra (region) was called by the Greeks Syrastrene (Συραστρηνή). Ptolemy mentions Syrastra, which may have once been its capital. Larica (Λαρική) was a rich commercial district between Syrastrene and Ariaca.

Dyrta (τὰ Δύρτα) was a small town in the country of the Assacani.

Peperine (Πεπερίνη) was an island off the south-west coast of India, undoubtedly derived its name from producing pepper.

Pactyice (Πακτϋική) was a district of North-Western India.

Triglyphon was the metropolis and royal residence of Cirrhadia (the modern Tipperah).

Palimbothra (Παλιμβόθρα) was one of the most important cities in India.

Chryse and Argyre were a pair of legendary islands, located in the Indian Ocean mentioned by ancient writers.

Bessyga (Βήσσυγα) was, according to Stephanus of Byzantium, an emporium in India.

Tagara (Τάγαρα), modern Ter, Maharashtra is described as an emporium in the Periplus of the Erythraean Sea.

Talmen (Ταλμήν), was a harbor in Gedrosia where Nearchus fleet found safe anchorage.

==== Taprobana/Taprobane-Palaesimundu-Salice ====
At the Anuradhapura Kingdom in Sri Lanka, there was a Greek settlement. Professor Merlin Peris, former professor of classics at the University of Peradeniya, wrote that “the Greeks whom King Pandukabhaya settled in the West Gate of Anuradhapura were not the second or third generation of Greeks who arrived in northwest India but were men who, just two decades ago at the most, left Greek homelands as Alexander's camp followers and came to Sri Lanka with or in the wake of Alexander's troops. When their fellow Greeks showed reluctance to push further south, these Greeks apparently had done so.” The Greeks called Sri Lanka Taprobana, some Greek authors also used Palaisimoundou, Salike and Sieladiba.

Palaesimundum (Παλαισιμούνδου) was a town in Taprobane, but in the Periplus of the Erythraean Sea the writer inform us that at his time the whole island was called like this (Ptolemy and Stephanus state that the island was called Simundum (Σιμούνδου), but it is very probable that they made a mistake and the correct name was Palaesimundum). Later the island was also called Salice (Σαλική).

Stephanus of Byzantium writes that a metropolis of the Taprobana was called Argyra (Ancient Greek: Ἀργυρᾶ) and that there was also a river called Phasis (Ancient Greek: Φᾶσις). Ptolemy called one of a group of islands which surrounded Sri Lanka Nagadiba (Greek: Ναγάδιβα) (see Jaffna Peninsula). Talacory (Ταλάκωρυ) or Aacote (Ἀακότη) was a port emporium on the north-western side of Taprobana.

Tarachi (Τάραχοι) was a tribe in Taprobane who had a port called Ἡλίου λίμην.

Galiba (Γάλιβα ἄκρα) was a promontory on the northern coast of Taprobane, close to the Cory island. Certain mountains in the immediate neighbourhood of it had the same name Γάλιβα ὄρη and the inhabitants of which were called Galibi (Γάλιβοι). Cape of Zeus (Δίος ἄκρα) was a promontory on the south of Taprobane. Its exact position cannot be identified, but it must have been close to present Galle, if not the same.

=== Tribes ===
Greek writers mention many tribes. For example, the:

- Abastanes or Abastani or Sambastae (Σαμβασταί) or Sabarcae, probably the Ambashtha.
- Arvarni (Ἀρούαρνοι), a tribe of India intra Gangem.
- Assakenoi or Assacani (Ἀσσακηνοί) or Astakenoi (Ἀστακηνοί).
- Calingae, people of India, live Gangem, close to the sea.
- Casiri, who according to Pliny the Elder were located near the Scythian world, were said to be cannibals.
- Caspeiraei (Κασπειραῖοι), a tribe of India intra Gangem.
- Gangaridae (Γαγγαρίδαι), people near the mouths of the Ganges. Ptolemy assigns them a capital, called Ganga Regia, on the western side of the Ganges.
- Guraeans (Γουραίοι).
- Harmatotrophi, a small tribe mentioned by Pliny as living at the foot of the Hindu Kush.
- Hippasii (Ἱππάσιοι), most probably the same tribe as the Aspasii (Ἀσπάσιοι) or Aspii (Ἄσπιοι).
- Kirradae (Κιρρᾶδαι).
- Maesoli (Μαισώλοι), people of the Maesolia.
- Mallian people.
- Mandalae (Μανδάλαι).
- Padaei (Παδαῖοι), an Indian tribe.
- Pandae, an Indian tribe with the habit of having female sovereigns.
- Parapiotae (Παραπιῶται), an Indian tribe along the banks of the Namadus river.
- Pargyetae (Παργυῆται), a tribe who occupied part of the Hindu Kush.
- Passalae (Πασσάλαι) a tribe in India extra Gangem.
- Zamirae or Zamirai (Ζαμῖραι) and Gamerae or Gamerai (Γαμῆραι) was a tribe in India extra Gangem roughly in modern Myanmar.
- Oritae (Ὠρεῖται), a tribe of the sea-coast of Gedrosia.
- Xathri (Ξάθροι), a tribe Indians dwelling along the banks of the Hydraotes. They may have derived their name from the caste of the Kshatriyas.
- Tacaraei (Τακαραῖοι), a mountain tribe of India extra Gangem. They must have occupied part of modern Assam.
- Taluctae, a tribe of India extra Gangem, mentioned by Pliny.
- Tabassi (Τάβασσοι), a tribe of Indians who occupied the interior of the southern part of Hindustan, in the neighbourhood of the present province of Mysore. It seems that they derived their name from the Sanskrit Tapasja, “woods.”

=== Other ===
Pāṇini, an ancient Sanskrit grammarian, was acquainted with the word yavana (Greek) in his composition.

Kātyāyana was a Sanskrit grammarian, mathematician and Vedic priest who lived in ancient India. He explained the term yavanānī as the script of the Yavanas. He took the same line as Pāṇini that the Old Persian term yauna became Sanskritised to name all Greeks.

Theodectes thought the dark color of some Indians was because of the sun.

Athenaeus in his Deipnosophistae mentions a Basilis (Βάσιλις) who wrote a series of books about the History of India.

Claudius Aelianus wrote about the animals in India. He also mentioned that there were Macedonians who settled in India in the cities founded by Alexander.

The Unani System of Medicine, a traditional system of medicine practiced in India, refers to Graeco-Arabic medicine, which is based on the teachings of Greek physicians Hippocrates and Galen. The ancient Greek medical system was enriched with local elements and received positively by the Indian people and physicians.

India and Indians are mentioned in some of Martial's Epigrams.

A lot of entries in the Suda, the Byzantine encyclopedia, are about India.

Clitophon of Rhodes wrote a now lost, multi-book work called Indika.

Chrysermus was the author of a now lost work History of India.

Pseudo-Plutarch's Names of Rivers and Mountains, cites Archelaus, author of the now-lost Treatise of Rivers, for his account of the Hydaspes River and related Indian traditions, and Dercyllus, author of the now-lost work On Mountains, for the story of Mount Elephas near the Hydaspes River in India. The name Elephas originated from a legendary event involving King Porus and Alexander the Great. Near the Hydaspes River, Porus's elephant was said to have been suddenly stung by a gadfly and fled to the top of the mountain of the sun, where it miraculously spoke in human language and warned Porus not to oppose Alexander because he was the son of Zeus. The elephant then died. Afterward, Porus made peace with Alexander, and the mountain was named Elephas (meaning "Elephant" in Greek).

== Modern archaeological evidence from Bronze Age ==
A wall-painting from the Minoan town of Akrotiri has been identified as depicting a grey langur, a species of monkey native to the Indus Valley. Bronze-age contact between the Minoan world and the Indian subcontinent was likely mediated by the civilisations of Mesopotamia.

The historian Peter Frankopan said that “long-distance trade, and connections between the Mediterranean, Asia and the Indian Ocean are well attested, even in this period [the Bronze Age], for high value, expensive objects.” (See Indo-Mediterranean).

The area of modern Hala Sultan Tekke in Cyprus was an important trade hub during the Late Bronze Age, with large quantities of imported goods from neighbouring regions but also faraway regions like Afghanistan and India.

== See also ==
- India (Herodotus)
- Indo-Greek Kingdom
- Greco-Bactrian Kingdom
- Indo-Scythians
- Greek campaigns in India
- The Shape of Ancient Thought

=== Greco-Buddhism ===
- Greco-Buddhism
- Greco-Buddhist monasticism
- Greco-Buddhist art
- Gandharan Buddhism
- Buddhism and the Roman world
- Indo-Greek religions
- Buddhas of Bamiyan
- Third Buddhist council

=== Trade and relations ===
- Buddhism and the Roman world
- Economic history of India
- Historic GDP of India (1-1947 CE)
- Indus–Mesopotamia relations
- Indo-Mediterranean
- Indo-Roman relations
- Indian Ocean trade
- Sino-Roman relations
- Indian maritime history
- Meluhha trade with Sumer

=== Other ===
- Romani people in Greece

== Bibliography ==
- Gazerani, Saghi (2015). The Sistani Cycle of Epics and Iran's National History: On the Margins of Historiography. BRILL. pp. 1–250. ISBN 9789004282964.
- D.C. Sircar (2008). Studies in Indian Coins. Motilal Banarsidass Publishers. ISBN 978-8120829732.
- Dictionary of Greek and Roman Geography (1854), William Smith, LLD, Ed., India
- Dictionary of Greek and Roman Geography (1854), William Smith, LLD, Ed., Taprobane
