= Indo-Greek Wars =

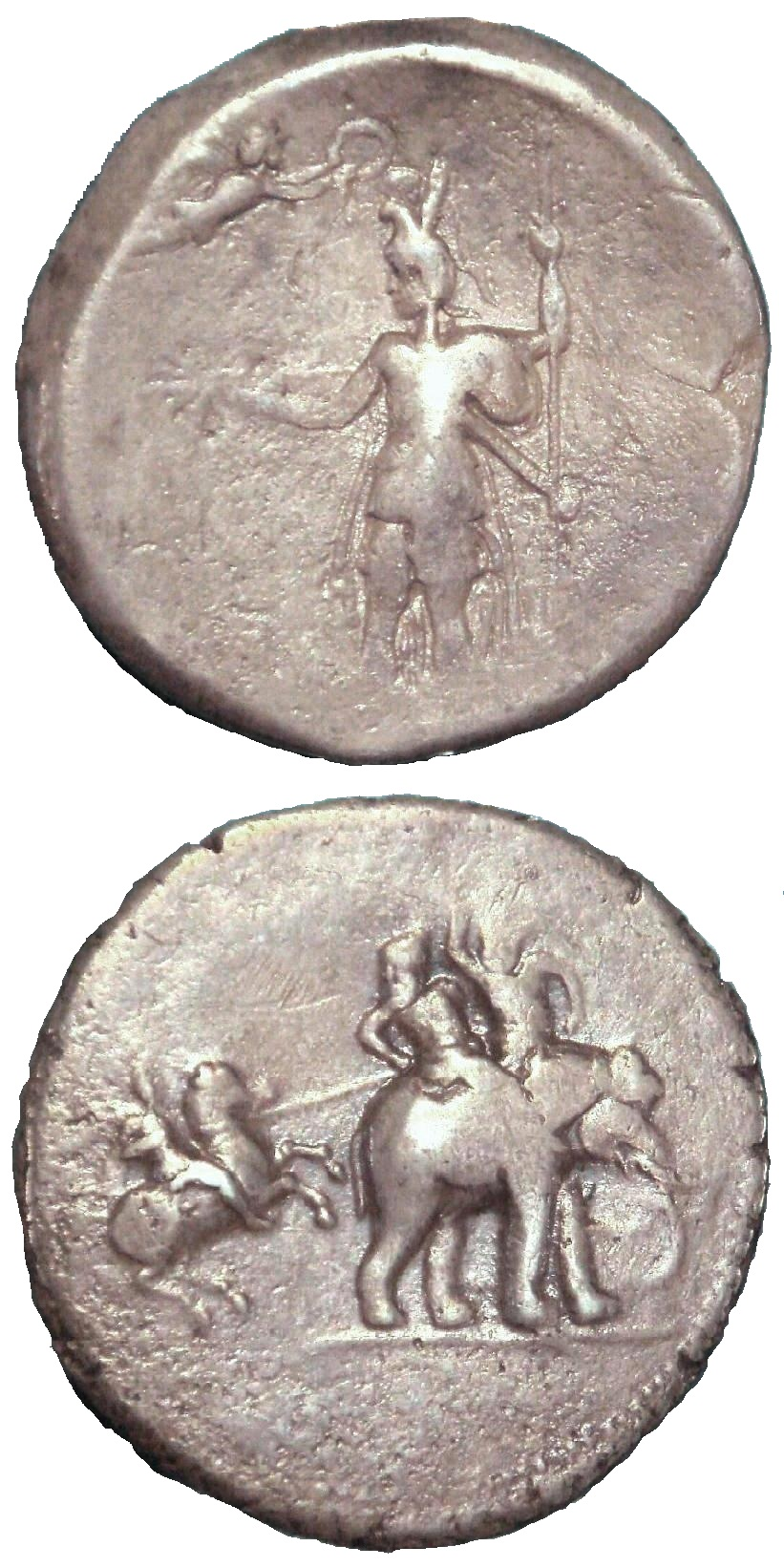
Victory coin of Alexander the Great, minted in Babylon c. 322 BCE, following his campaigns in the subcontinent. Obv: Alexander being crowned by Nike. Rev: Alexander attacking king Porus on his elephant. Silver. British Museum

The Indo-Greek Wars refers to the various conflicts fought between Hellenistic Greek polities and Indian polities, spanning roughly from the early 2nd century BCE to the 1st century BCE.

== Legend of the God Bacchus in Ancient India ==
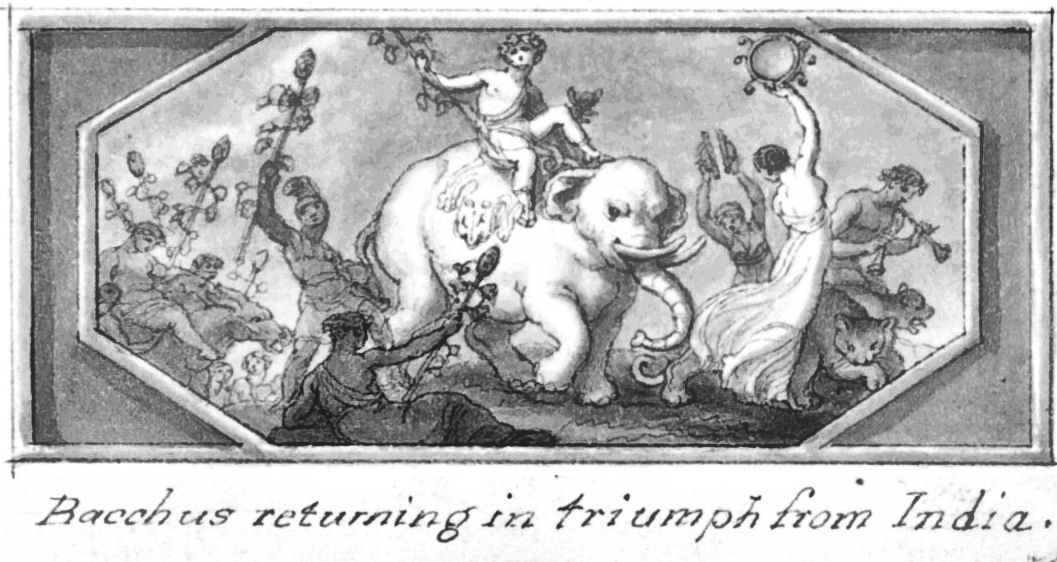
Bacchus/ Dionysus returning from ancient India

A legendary account states that when the Greek God Bacchus/Dionysus grew up, he discovered the culture of the vine and the mode of extracting its precious juice, being the first to do so; but Hera struck him with madness, and drove him forth a wanderer through various parts of the earth. In Phrygia the goddess Cybele, better known to the Greeks as Rhea, cured him and taught him her religious rites, and he set out on a progress through Asia teaching the people the cultivation of the vine. The most famous part of his wanderings is his expedition to the Indian subcontinent, which is said to have lasted several years fighting a king known as Deriades. According to a legend, when Alexander the Great reached a city called Nysa near the Indus River, the locals said that their city was founded by Dionysus in the distant past and their city was dedicated to the god Dionysus. These travels took something of the form of military conquests; according to Diodorus Siculus he conquered the whole world except for Britain and Ethiopia. Returning in triumph (he was considered the founder of the triumphal procession) he undertook to introduce his worship into Greece, but was opposed by some princes who dreaded its introduction on account of the disorders and madness it brought with it (e.g. Pentheus or Lycurgus).

== Campaign of Alexander the Great (327–326 BC) ==
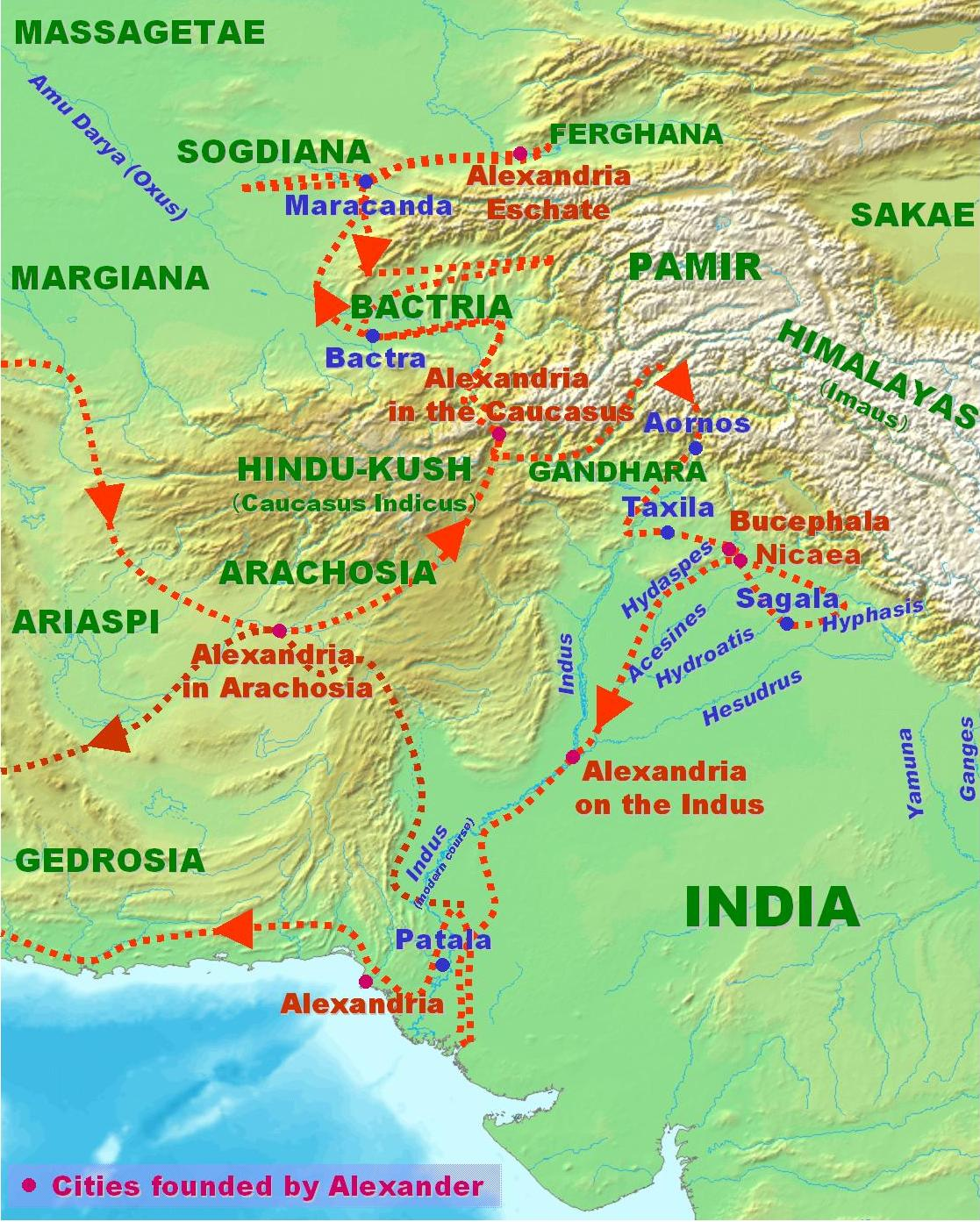
Campaigns and landmarks of Alexander's invasion of the Indian subcontinent

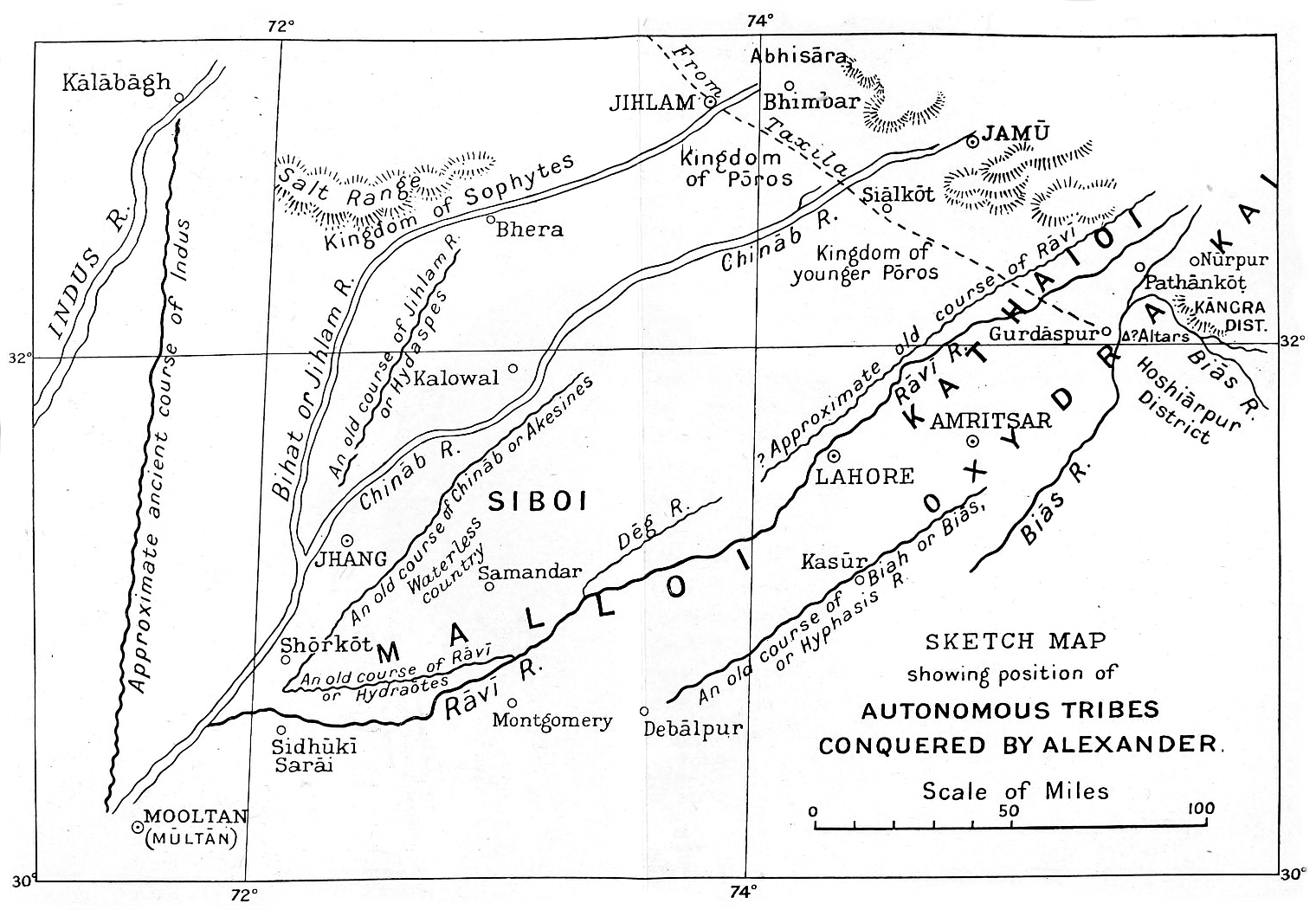
Autonomous ancient Indian tribes conquered by Alexander the Great

In 327 BC Alexander the Great began his foray into Punjab. King Ambhi, ruler of Taxila, surrendered the city to Alexander. Many people had fled to a high fortress/rock called Aornos. Alexander took Aornos by storm after a successful siege. Alexander fought an epic battle against the ancient Indian monarch Porus in the Battle of Hydaspes (326).

East of Porus' kingdom, near the Ganges River, was the powerful kingdom of Magadha, under the Nanda Dynasty.

According to Plutarch, at the time of Alexander's Battle of the Hydaspes River, Magadha's army further east numbered 200,000 infantry, 80,000 cavalry, 8,000 chariots, and 6,000 war elephants, which was discouraging for Alexander's men and stayed their further progress into the Indian subcontinent:

As for the Macedonians, however, their struggle with Porus blunted their courage and stayed their further advance into India. For having had all they could do to repulse an enemy who mustered only twenty thousand infantry and two thousand horse, they violently opposed Alexander when he insisted on crossing the river Ganges also, the width of which, as they learned, was •thirty-two furlongs, its depth •a hundred fathoms, while its banks on the further side were covered with multitudes of men-at‑arms and horsemen and elephants. For they were told that the kings of the Ganderites and Praesii were awaiting them with eighty thousand horsemen, two hundred thousand footmen, eight thousand chariots, and six thousand fighting elephants. And there was no boasting in these reports. For Androcottus, who reigned there not long afterwards, made a present to Seleucus of five hundred elephants, and with an army of six hundred thousand men overran and subdued all India.
--Plutarch, Parallel Lives, "Life of Alexander"

Exhausted and frightened by the prospect of facing another giant Indian army at the Ganges River, his army mutinied at the Hyphasis (modern Beas), refusing to march further east. Alexander, after meeting his officer Coenus, was convinced that it was better to return.

Alexander was forced to turn south, conquering his way down the Indus to the Arabian Sea. He sent much of his army to Carmania (modern southern Iran) with his general Craterus, and commissioned a fleet to explore the Persian Gulf shore under his admiral Nearchus, while he led the rest of his forces back to Persia by the southern route through Gedrosia (modern Makran in southern Pakistan).

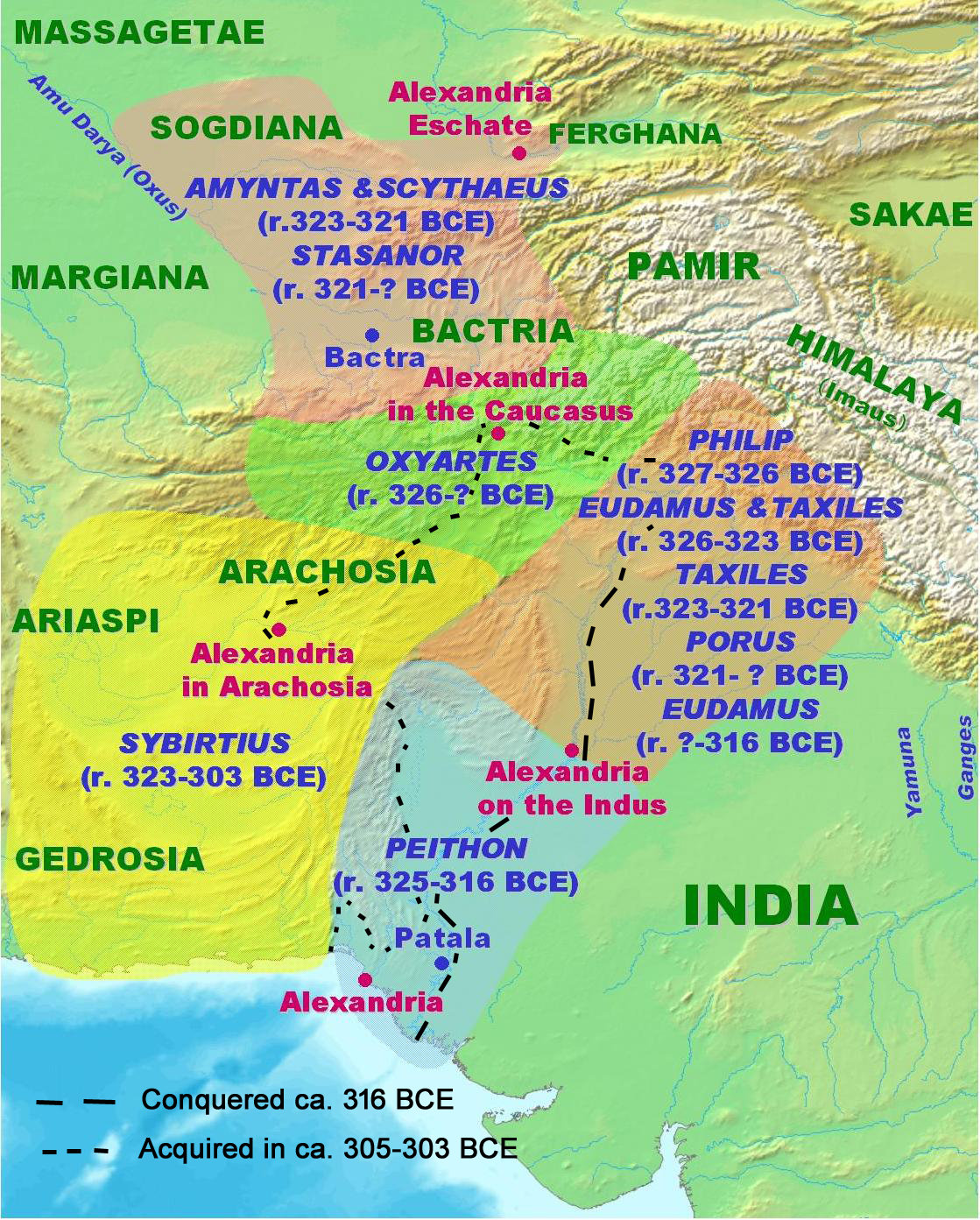
Hellenistic satrapies in ancient India after Alexander

Alexander left behind Greek forces which established themselves in the city of Taxila, now in Pakistan. Several generals, such as Eudemus and Peithon governed the newly established province until around 316 BC. One of them, Sophytes (305–294 BC), was an independent Indian prince in the Punjab.

== Seleucid–Mauryan War (305 BC) ==
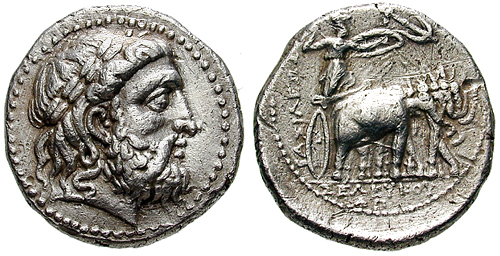
Tetradrachm of Seleucus from Seleucia. Obverse: the head of Zeus, Reverse: Athena with elephants

Alexander's army mutinied along the Hyphasis, as Alexander died before he could make a conquest in fighting the Nanda Empire, making the Beas River the eastern border of the Macedonian Empire.

Following Alexander's death, Seleucus I Nicator, founder of the Seleucid dynasty and former Diadochi, gained control over Mesopotamia and the eastern satraps of the former Macedonian Empire. Seleucus unsuccessfully tried to campaign in India by invading what is now Punjab in northern India and Pakistan in 305 BC.

Meanwhile, in India, Chandragupta Maurya, the founder of the Maurya Empire with the help of Chanakya his mentor and political advisor, rose to power by overthrowing the Nanda Empire in Pataliputra. His next course of action was to lead his armies into the Indus to battle with the Seleucid Empire and annex the satraps. The Seleucid-Mauryan War waged on for over two years, resulting in significant territorial and political change in the region. To resolve the conflict both parties finally settled upon a marriage alliance. Chandragupta annexed the Greek satraps, while also gaining the daughter of Seleucus in marriage. In exchange Basileus Seleucus received 500 prized war elephant from the Indian Emperor, an asset which was used to decisively win the Battle of Ipsus. Seleucus also sent an ambassador named Megasthenes to Chandragupta's court, who repeatedly visited Chandragupta's capital of Pataliputra (modern Patna in Bihar state). Megasthenes wrote detailed descriptions of India and Chandragupta's reign.

Continued diplomatic exchanges and good relations between the Seleucids and the Mauryan emperors are then documented throughout the duration of the Mauryan empire.

== Shunga-Greek War (180s–113 BCE) ==
The Greek king Demetrius is regarded to have tried to invade the subcontinent after his win over the Kabul Valley. The Shungas were able to successfully resist the invasion and expel the Greeks out of Magadha.

== Indo-Greek Kingdom (180 BC – 10 AD) ==
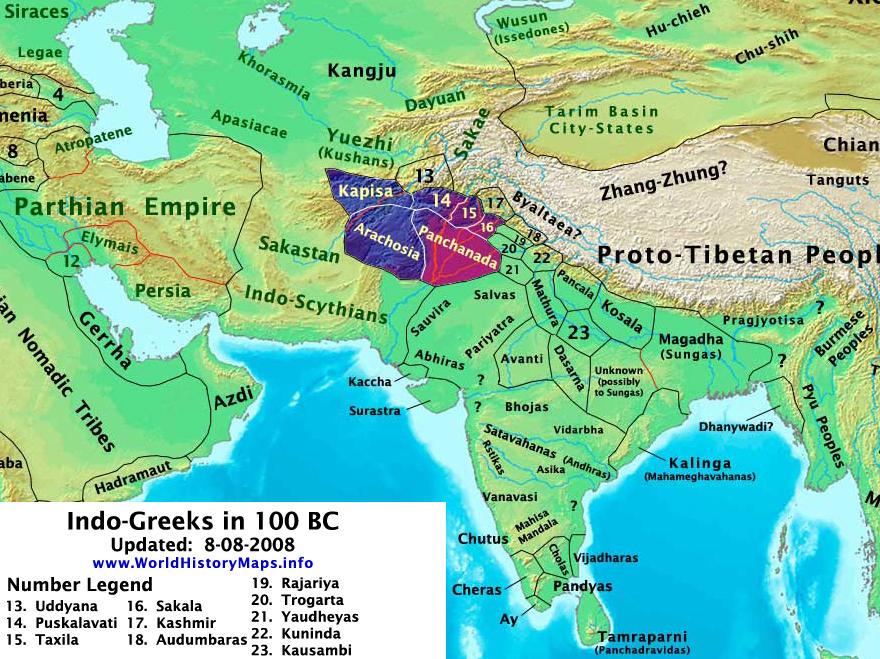
Indo-Greek Kingdoms in 100 BC

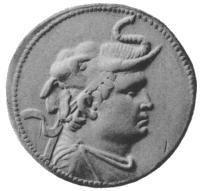
The founder of the Indo-Greek Kingdom Demetrius I (205–171 BC), wearing the scalp of an elephant, symbol of his conquests in the Indus Valley

In 180 BC, the Indo-Greeks, invaded parts of northwest and northern India and ruled in the Punjab region. They are an extension of the Greco-Bactrian dynasty of Greek kings (the Euthydemids) located in neighbouring Bactria.

The invasion of northern India followed the destruction of the Mauryan dynasty by the general Pushyamitra Shunga, who then founded the new Indian Shunga dynasty (185 BC-78 BC). The Indo-Greek king Menander may have campaigned as far as the capital Pataliputra in eastern India (today Patna): "Those who came after Alexander went to the Ganges and Pataliputra" (Strabo, XV.698).

The Indo-Greeks ruled various parts of north-western South Asia until the end of the 1st century BC, when they were conquered by the Scythians and Kushans.

== Legacy ==
Buddhism flourished under the Indo-Greeks, leading to the Greco-Buddhist cultural syncretism. The arts of the Indian sub-continent were also quite affected by Hellenistic art during and after these interactions.

== See also ==
- Ancient Greece–Ancient India relations
- Indo-Mediterranean
- Indo-Roman relations
- Indo-Roman trade relations
- Indian maritime history
- Spice trade

== Sources ==
- Bull, Malcolm, The Mirror of the Gods, How Renaissance Artists Rediscovered the Pagan Gods, Oxford UP, 2005, ISBN 9780195219234
- Dalby, Andrew (2005). The Story of Bacchus. London: British Museum Press. ISBN 0-7141-2255-6.
- Halkias, Georgios. “When the Greeks Converted the Buddha: Asymmetrical Transfers of Knowledge in Indo-Greek Cultures.” In Religions and Trade: Religious Formation, Transformation and Cross-Cultural Exchange between East and West, ed. Volker Rabens. Leiden: Brill, 2013: 65–115.
- ________. “The Self-immolation of Kalanos and other Luminous Encounters among Greeks and Indian Buddhists in the Hellenistic world.” Journal of the Oxford Centre for Buddhist Studies, Vol. VIII, 2015: 163–186.

| Timeline and cultural period | Indus plain (Punjab-Sapta Sindhu-Gujarat) | Gangetic Plain | | | Central India | Southern India |
| Timeline and cultural period | Indus plain (Punjab-Sapta Sindhu-Gujarat) | Upper Gangetic Plain (Ganga-Yamuna doab) | Middle Gangetic Plain | Lower Gangetic Plain | Central India | Southern India |
IRON AGE
| Culture | Late Vedic Period | Late Vedic Period; Painted Grey Ware culture | Late Vedic Period; Northern Black Polished Ware | | Pre-history | |
| 6th century BCE | Gandhara | Kuru-Panchala | Magadha | | Adivasi (tribes) | Assaka |
| Culture | Persian-Greek influences | "Second Urbanisation"; Rise of Shramana movements Jainism - Buddhism - Ājīvika - Yoga | | | Pre-history | |
| 5th century BCE | (Persian conquests) | | Shaishunaga dynasty | | Adivasi (tribes) | Assaka |
| 4th century BCE | (Greek conquests) | Nanda empire | | | | |
HISTORICAL AGE
| Culture | Spread of Buddhism | | | | Pre-history | |
| 3rd century BCE | Maurya Empire | | | | | Satavahana dynasty Sangam period (300 BCE – 200 CE); Early Cholas; Early Pandyan kingdom Cheras |
| Culture | Preclassical Hinduism (Note: Michaels (2004) p.39) - "Hindu Synthesis" (Note: Hiltebeitel (2002)) (ca. 200 BCE - 300 CE) (Note: Michaels (2004) p.39) (Note: Hiltebeitel (2002)); Epics - Puranas - Ramayana - Mahabharata - Bhagavad Gita - Brahma Sutras - Smarta Tradition; Mahayana Buddhism | | | | | |
| 2nd century BCE | Indo-Greek Kingdom | | Shunga Empire; Maha-Meghavahana Dynasty | | | Satavahana dynasty Sangam period (300 BCE – 200 CE); Early Cholas; Early Pandyan kingdom Cheras |
| 1st century BCE | Indo-Greek Kingdom | | Shunga Empire; Maha-Meghavahana Dynasty | | | Satavahana dynasty Sangam period (300 BCE – 200 CE); Early Cholas; Early Pandyan kingdom Cheras |
| 1st century CE | Indo-Scythians; Indo-Parthians | | Kuninda Kingdom | | | Satavahana dynasty Sangam period (300 BCE – 200 CE); Early Cholas; Early Pandyan kingdom Cheras |
| 2nd century | Kushan Empire | | | | | Satavahana dynasty Sangam period (300 BCE – 200 CE); Early Cholas; Early Pandyan kingdom Cheras |
| 3rd century | Kushano-Sasanian Kingdom; Western Satraps | Kushan Empire | | Kamarupa kingdom | Adivasi (tribes) | Satavahana dynasty Sangam period (300 BCE – 200 CE); Early Cholas; Early Pandyan kingdom Cheras |
| Culture | "Golden Age of Hinduism"(ca. CE 320-650) (Note: Michaels (2004) p.40); Puranas - Kural; Co-existence of Hinduism and Buddhism | | | | | |
| 4th century | Kidarites | Gupta Empire; Varman dynasty | | | | Andhra Ikshvakus; Kalabhra dynasty Kadamba Dynasty; Western Ganga Dynasty |
| 5th century | Hephthalite Empire | Alchon Huns | | | | Vishnukundina; Kalabhra dynasty |
| 6th century | Nezak Huns; Kabul Shahi; Maitraka | | | | Adivasi (tribes) | Vishnukundina; Badami Chalukyas; Kalabhra dynasty |
| Culture | Late-Classical Hinduism (ca. CE 650-1100) (Note: Michaels (2004) p.41); Advaita Vedanta - Tantra; Decline of Buddhism in India | | | | | |
| 7th century | Indo-Sassanids | | Vakataka dynasty Empire of Harsha | Mlechchha dynasty | Adivasi (tribes) | Badami Chalukyas; Eastern Chalukyas; Pandyan kingdom (revival); Pallava |
| 7th century | Karkota dynasty | | | | Adivasi (tribes) | |
| 8th century | Kabul Shahi | Pala Empire | | | Adivasi (tribes) | Eastern Chalukyas; Pandyan kingdom Kalachuri |
| 9th century | Gurjara-Pratihara | | | | Adivasi (tribes) | Rashtrakuta Empire; Eastern Chalukyas; Pandyan kingdom Medieval Cholas; Chera Perumals of Makkotai |
| 10th century | Ghaznavids | | | Pala dynasty Kamboja-Pala dynasty | Adivasi (tribes) | Kalyani Chalukyas; Eastern Chalukyas; Medieval Cholas; Chera Perumals of Makkotai; Rashtrakuta |
References and sources for table References Sources: Flood, Gavin D. (1996), An Introduction to Hinduism, Cambridge University Press; Hiltebeitel, Alf (2002), Hinduism. In: Joseph Kitagawa, "The Religious Traditions of Asia: Religion, History, and Culture", Routledge; Michaels, Axel (2004), Hinduism. Past and present, Princeton, New Jersey: Princeton University Press
