= Seleucid–Mauryan War =

c. 305–303 BCE conflict in South Asia

- Part of Conquests of Chandragupta Maurya
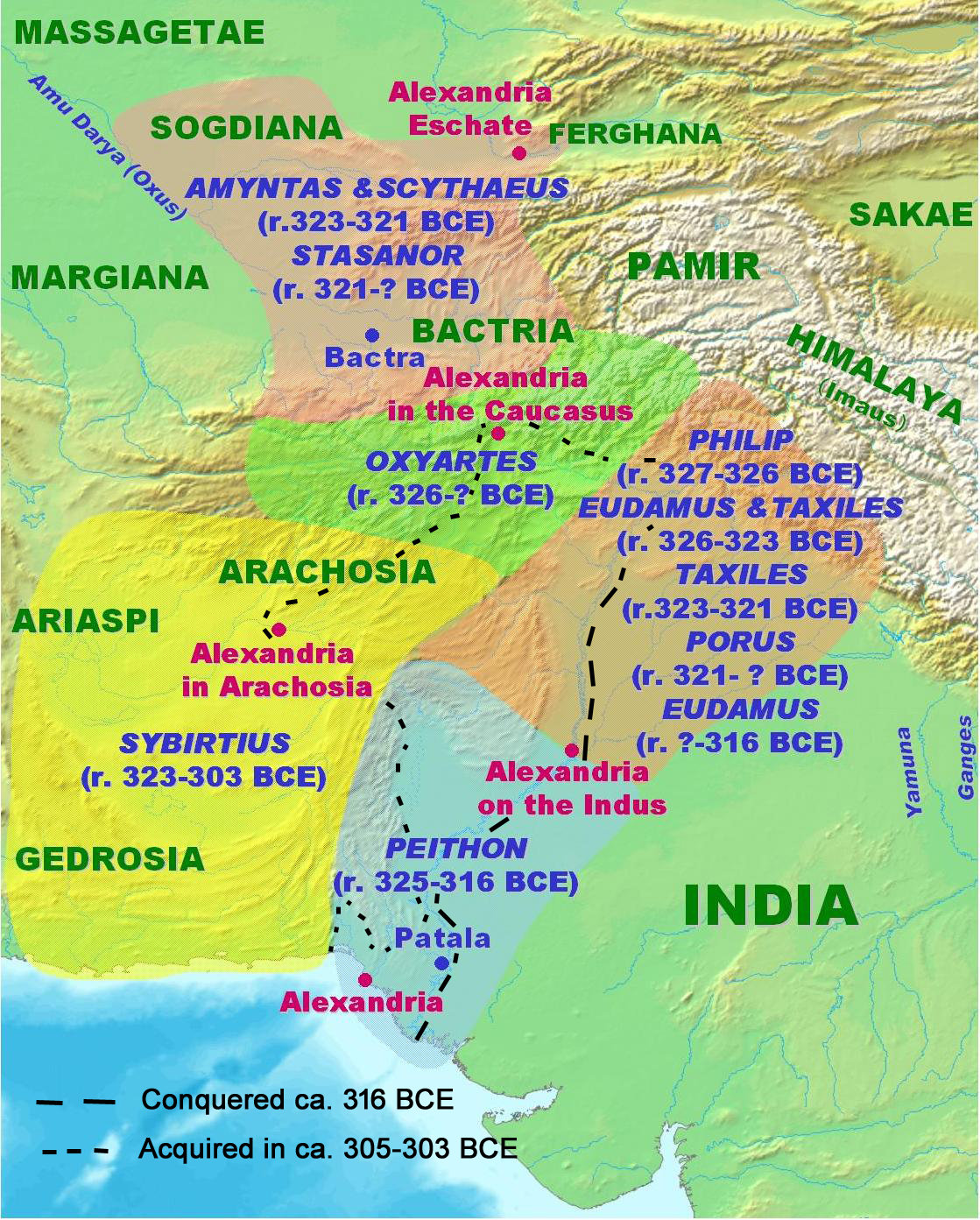
- Alexander the Great's Eastern Satrapies in South Asia
| Date | 305–303 BCE |
| Location | Indus Valley, Northwestern South Asia |
| Result | Strabo: "Seleucus Nicator gave [territories that lie along the Indus] to Sandrocottus [Chandragupta], upon terms of intermarriage and of receiving in exchange five hundred elephants." (Note: Jansari (2023, p. 35): "None of the ancient authors depicted either Seleucus or Chandragupta as the clear victor of this battle.") |
| Territorial changes | Parts of Seleucid Empire's eastern satrapies ceded to the Maurya Empire: Gandhara, Paropamisadae, eastern part of Gedrosia, possibly also Arachosia and Aria up to modern-day Herat (Note: Ceded territories: V.A. Smith and Tarn agree that the Malan mountain range and the Porali river, a tributary of the Hingol river, formed the western limit of the part of Gedrosia (Baluchistan) ceded to Chandragupta.; Thapar (1963, p. 16): "Certain areas in the north-west were acquired through the treaty with Seleucus. There is no absolute certainty as to which these areas were and it has been suggested [Smith (1914), Early History of India, p.159] that the territory ceded consisted of Gedrosia, Arachosia, Aria [modern-day Herat], and the Paropamisadae."; The acquisition of Aria (modern Herat) is disputed. According to Raychaudhuri & Mukherjee (1996), p.594, it "has been wrongly included in the list of ceded satrapies by some scholars [...] on the basis of wrong assessments of the passage of Strabo [...] and a statement by Pliny." According to John D Grainger (2014, p. 109), "Seleucus "must [...] have held Aria", and furthermore, his "son Antiochos was active there fifteen years later".) |

Belligerents
| Maurya Empire | Seleucid Empire |

Commanders and leaders
| Chandragupta Maurya | Seleucus I Nicator |

The Seleucid–Mauryan War was a confrontation between the Seleucid and Mauryan empires that took place sometime between 305 and 303 BCE, when Seleucus I Nicator of the Seleucid Empire crossed the Indus River into the former Indian satrapies of the Macedonian Empire, which had been conquered by Emperor Chandragupta Maurya of the Maurya Empire.

The confrontation resulted in a dynastic marriage-alliance between Seleucus and Chandragupta, the gift of war elephants to Seleucus, and the transferring of control over the Indus Valley region and (possibly) part of Afghanistan to Chandragupta. The alliance freed Seleucus to turn his attention toward his rivals in the west, while Chandragupta secured control over the areas that he had sought, the Maurya Empire emerging as the dominant power of the Indian subcontinent.

== Background ==
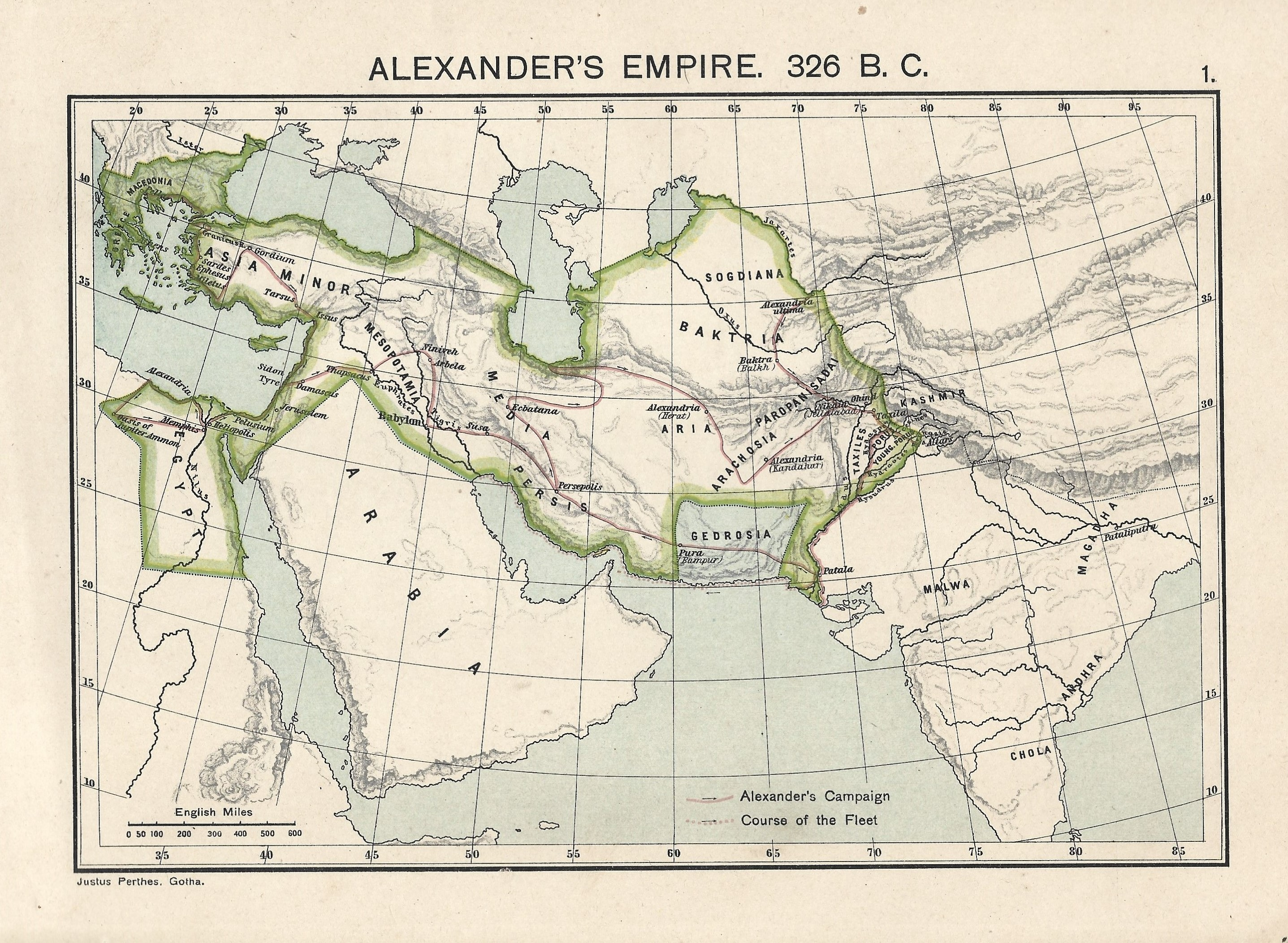
Alexander's empire (from Charles Joppen SJ, Historical Atlas of India: For the use of High Schools, Colleges, and Private Students, London: Longman, Green & Co., 1907

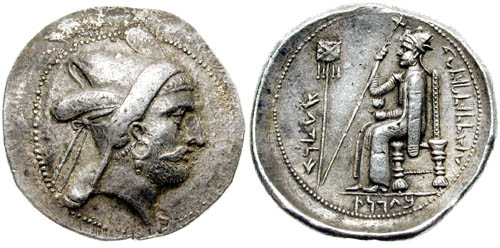
Bagadates I (Minted 290–280 BC), the first indigenous satrap to be appointed by the Seleucid Empire

In the wake of Alexander's Indian campaign, Chandragupta Maurya led a successful revolt from north-western India against the Nanda Dynasty, rulers at the time of the Gangetic Plain, establishing himself as Emperor of Magadha around 321 BC. He fought the empire for eleven years with successful guerrilla campaigns, and captured the Nanda capital of Pataliputra. This led to the fall of the empire and the eventual creation of the Maurya Empire with Chandragupta Maurya as its emperor.

The Persian provinces in what is now modern Afghanistan, together with the wealthy kingdom of Gandhara and the states of the Indus Valley, had all submitted to Alexander the Great and become part of his empire. When Alexander died, the Wars of the Diadochi ("Successors") split his empire apart; as his generals fought for control of Alexander's empire. In the eastern territories one of these generals, Seleucus I Nicator, was taking control and was starting to establish what became known as the Seleucid Empire. According to the Roman historian Appian, History of Rome, Seleucus was

Always lying in wait for the neighboring nations, strong in arms and persuasive in council, he acquired Mesopotamia, Armenia, 'Seleucid' Cappadocia, Persis, Parthia, Bactria, Arabia, Tapouria, Sogdia, Arachosia, Hyrcania, and other adjacent peoples that had been subdued by Alexander, as far as the river Indus, so that the boundaries of his empire were the most extensive in Asia after that of Alexander. The whole region from Phrygia to the Indus was subject to Seleucus.

The Roman historian Justin described how Sandrocottus (Greek version of Chandragupta's name) assassinated Greek governors and established an oppressive regime "after taking the throne":

"India, after the death of Alexander, had assassinated his prefects, as if shaking the burden of servitude. The author of this liberation was Sandracottos [Chandragupta], but he had transformed liberation in servitude after victory, since, after taking the throne, he himself oppressed the very people he has liberated from foreign domination."

— Junianus Justinus, Histoires Philippiques Liber, XV.4.12–13

== Confrontation ==
Details of the conflict are lacking, and the only sources mentioning the confrontation between Seleucus and Chandragupta are a few references by Strabo, Appian, Plutarch, and Justin. According to Appian,

[Seleucus] crossed the Indus and waged war with Sandrocottus [Maurya], king of the Indians, who dwelt on the banks of that stream, until they came to an understanding with each other and contracted a marriage relationship. Some of these exploits were performed before the death of Antigonus and some afterward.

— Appian, History of Rome, The Syrian Wars

While numerous authors interpret the Greek sources as describing a Mauryan victory, others are more cautious, and stay close to what the Greek sources say. (Note: The greek sources have been interpreted somewhat differently, with some concluding or stating that Chandragupta was victorious over Seleucus, but others more cautiously staying close to the primary sources: Keay (2018, p. 84) states that "perhaps he was roundly defeated. The terms of the peace treaty certainly suggest so."; Grainger (2014, pp. 108–109) concludes that Seleucus invaded India, and was defeated, but states that "[b]eyond that, it is not possible to go without further evidence." There is "little or no evidence" for the idea that Chandragupta drove back Seleucus' forces as far back as Bactria. Grainger (2014, pp. 108); Basham (1986, p. 52) states that Seleucus "seems to have suffered the worst of the engagement, for he failed in his attempt to recover Alexander's Indian provinces, and was compelled to yield parts of what is now Afghanistan to Chandragupta, receiving in return only 500 elephants."; Thapar (2004, p. 176) speaks of "a campaign against Seleucus, in which Chandragupta seems to have been successful, judging by the terms of the treaty of 303 BC."; Kulke & Rothermund (2016, p. 39) state that Chandragupta "stopped his march east," and then present the terms of the peace treaty.; Jansari (2023, pp. 1–2): "Richard Billows suggested that Seleucus was ‘reasonably successful’ in the war against Chandragupta [...] Frank Holt wrote that Seleucus accepted a token submission from Chandragupta, while Susan Sherwin-White and Amélie Kuhrt agreed with F. W. Walbank that the elephants Seleucus received constituted a major prize. ") The details of the conflict, and if there was in fact a pitched battle, are unknown, and Jansari warns that "there are very little details about the battle or skirmish they fought, and that none of the ancient authors depicted either Seleucus or Chandragupta as the clear victor of this battle. This lack of information about the encounter and the ensuing treaty means that it is impossible to reconstruct them." Wheatley and Heckel suggest that the degree of friendly Maurya-Seleucid relations established after the war implies that the hostilities were probably "neither prolonged nor grievous".

== Dynastic marriage-alliance ==
The confrontation was followed by a dynastic marriage-alliance, briefly mentioned by, or alluded to, by Greco-Roman authors Strabo (64 or 63 BCE – c. 24 CE) XV 2,9, Plutarch (1st c. CE), Justin (2nd c. CE), and Appian (2nd c. CE) 'Syr. 55. According to Jansari, Strabos and Plutarch may have drawn information from the same source, possibly Megasthenes. No Indian sources record the events, and Jansari warns that "the dependence on a small group of sources from only one literary tradition necessitates a cautious approach to these texts and the events they describe."

Three terms are recorded by these ancient sources. Seleucus Nicator seems to have ceded territories to Chandragupta, and received war elephants from Chandragupta Maurya, which subsequently influenced the Wars of the Diadochi in the west. Seleucus and Chandragupta also agreed to a marriage alliance, probably the marriage of Seleucus' daughter to Chandragupta.

=== Overview of the alliance ===
Strabo mentions the exchange of elephants and territory as part of the dynastic marriage-alliance. In his Geographica, composed about 300 years after Chandragupta's death, he describes a number of tribes living along the Indus, and then states that "The Indians occupy [in part] some of the countries situated along the Indus, which formerly belonged to the Persians":

The geographical position of the tribes is as follows: along the Indus are the Paropamisadae, above whom lies the Paropamisus Mountains: then, towards the south, the Arachoti: then next, towards the south, the Gedroseni, with the other tribes that occupy the seaboard; and the Indus lies, latitudinally, alongside all these places; and of these places, in part, some that lie along the Indus are held by Indians, although they formerly belonged to the Persians. Alexander [III 'the Great' of Macedon] took these away from the Arians and established settlements of his own, but Seleucus Nicator gave them to Sandrocottus [Chandragupta], upon terms of intermarriage and of receiving in exchange five hundred elephants.

Jansari notes that "them" refers to "territories previously held by Alexander, but it is not specified which these were."

V.A. Smith (1914):

...the cession made in 303 b.c. by Seleukos Nikator to Chandragupta Maurya included provinces of the Paropanisadae (Kabul), Aria (Herat), Arachosia (Kandahar), and probably Gedrosia (Makran), or a large part of that satrapy.

Kosmin summarizes those sources as follows, cautiously interpreting which territories may have been transferred:

The ancient historians Justin, Appian, and Strabo preserve the three main terms of what I will call the Treaty of the Indus:
(i) Seleucus transferred to Chandragupta's kingdom the easternmost satrapies of his empire, certainly Gandhara, Parapamisadae, and the eastern parts of Gedrosia, and possibly also Arachosia and Aria as far as Herat.
(ii) Chandragupta gave Seleucus 500 Indian war elephants.
(iii) The two kings were joined by some kind of marriage alliance (ἐπιγαμία οι κῆδος); most likely Chandragupta wed a female relative of Seleucus.

Jansari notes that, in the 20th century, diverging views on Chandragupta have developed between western academics and Indian scholars. While westerners tend to take a reserved view on Chandragupta's accomplishments, Indian authors have portrayed Chandragupta as a very successful king who established the first Indian nation.

=== Transferred territories ===
==== Gedrosia (Baluchistan) ====
===== Malan mountain range (Purali/Hingol river) =====
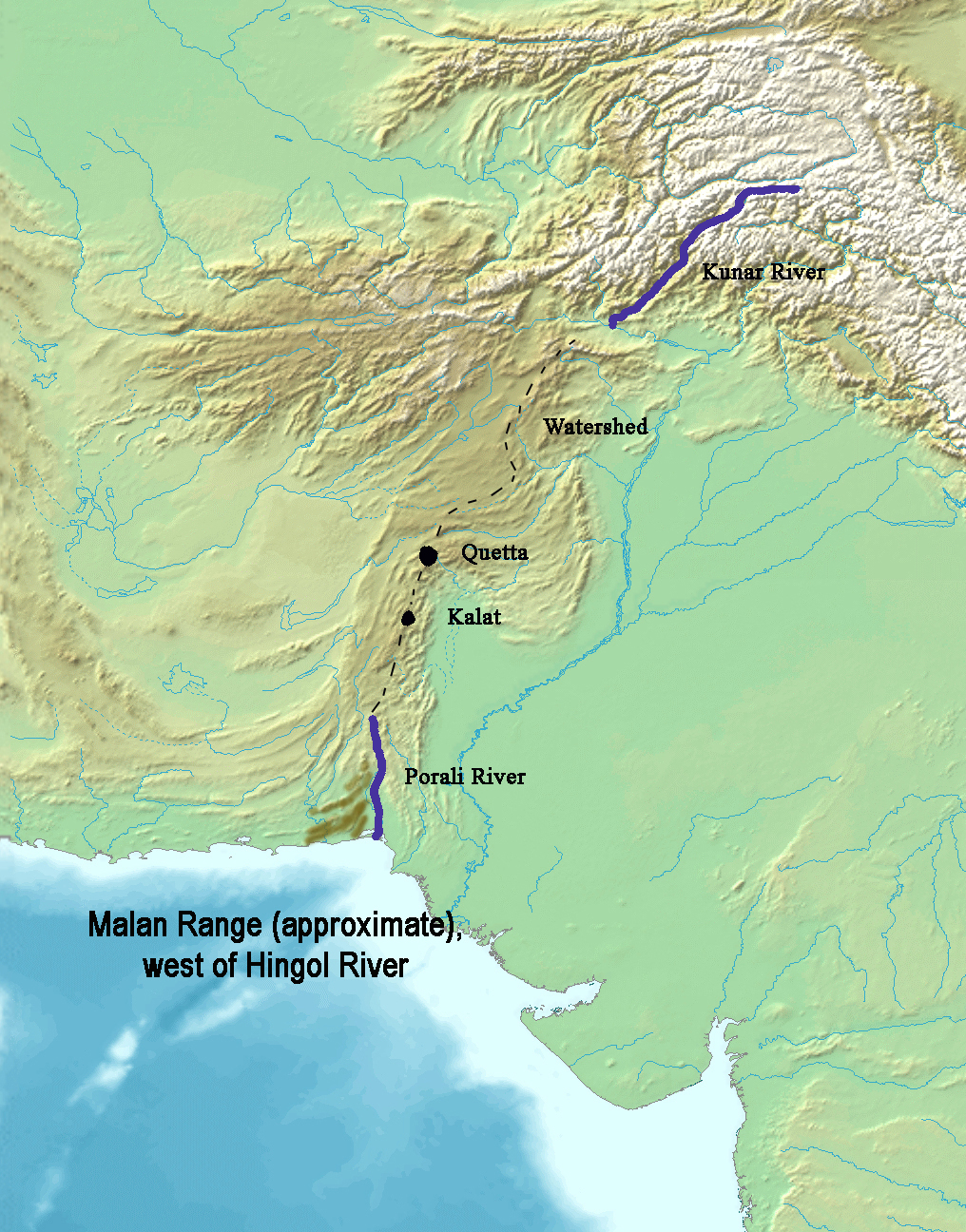
Malan Range and limit of ceded territory according to Tarn (1922). (Note: Tarn (1922, p. 101): "The Paropamisadae was not among the provinces ceded by Seleucus to Chandragupta [...] there is a passage from Eratosthenes, usually neglected, which seems plain enough. It says that, before Alexander, the Paropamisadae, Arachosia, and Gedrosia all stretched to the Indus; the reference is to the Achaemenid satrapies, and it implies that in Persian times the Paropamisadae and Gandhara were one satrapy. Alexander (it continues) took away from Iran the parts of these three satrapies which lay along the Indus and made of them separate [caroikia] (which must here mean governments or provinces); it was these which Seleucus ceded, being districts predominantly Indian in blood [...] Of the satrapy which Eratosthenes calls Paropamisadae Chandragupta got Gandhara, the land between the Kunar River and the Indus River; this is certain, because Eratosthenes says that he did not get the whole, while the thorough evangelisation of Gandhara by Asoka shows that it belonged to the Mauryas. The boundary in Arachosia cannot be precisely defined; but, speaking very roughly, what Chandragupta got lay east of a line starting from the Kunar River and following the watershed to somewhere near Quetta and then going to the sea by Kalat and the Porali River; that will serve as an indication. The Paropamisadae itself was never Chandragupta’s. See this map for Porali River, close to the Hingol River.)

V.A. Smith (1914), Early History of India,:

The satrapy of Gedrosia (or Gadrosia) extended far to the west, and probably only the eastern part of it was annexed by Chandragupta. The Malin range of mountains, (Note: Nothing can be found out about "Malin", but there is a "Malan" mountain range, that is described as "an offshoot of the Makran Coastal Range", and it was a barrier to Alexander's passage; see Pierre Eggermont (1975), Alexander's Campaign in Sind and Baluchistan and the Siege of the Brahmin Town of Harmatelia, p.58. It seems to be a little to the west of Hingol National Park and Hinglaj Mata Temple.) which Alexander experienced such difficulty in crossing, (Note: Alexander not crossing the Malin mountain range: Eggermont (1975, p. 58) describes the area, stating that the Malan range is an offshoot of the Makran Coastal Range, which was explored by Sir Aurel Stein, who found out that "the Buzelak, or "Goat's Pass", leading from the Malan plain across the Malan range into the plain of Ormara proved to be very steep," concluding that it was unlikely that Alexander had passed over the Malan range.; Cummings (2004, pp. 395–396) also gives a description of the struggles of Alexander's army at hteir retreat from India: "They turned west, reaching the mouth of the Tomerus (Hingol) River [...] Alexander, true to his tactical principles, prepared to advance along the coast [...] An unexpected obstacle arose to the continuance of the line of march. On the other side of the river loomed the utterly impossible barrier of the Malan (modern name) mountain range, its seaward end dropping abruptly and precipitately into the ater, and barring passage.") would have furnished a natural boundary.

Tarn limits the ceded part of Gedrosia to the territory east of the Porali Hingol) river, referring to Eratosthenes (c.276 BC – c.195/194 BCE), who states (in Tarn words) that

Alexander [...] took away from Iran the parts of these three satrapies which lay along the Indus and made of them separate [...] governments or province; it was these which Seleucus ceded, being districts predominantly Indian in blood. In Gedrosia the boundary is known: the country ceded was that between the Median Hydaspes (Note: The "Median Hydaspes" river is not the Jhelum here. The Purali/Porali river seems to be this river of the Lasbela District, which is prone to devasting floods in the rainy season but running almost dry at other times of the year. If that is correct, Tarn/Eratosthenes are telling us that the extent of the land ceded by the Seleucids to the Mauryas went barely farther west than Karachi, obviously nowhere near Iran.) (probably the Purali (Note: Porali, a tributary of the Hingol river.)) and the Indus."

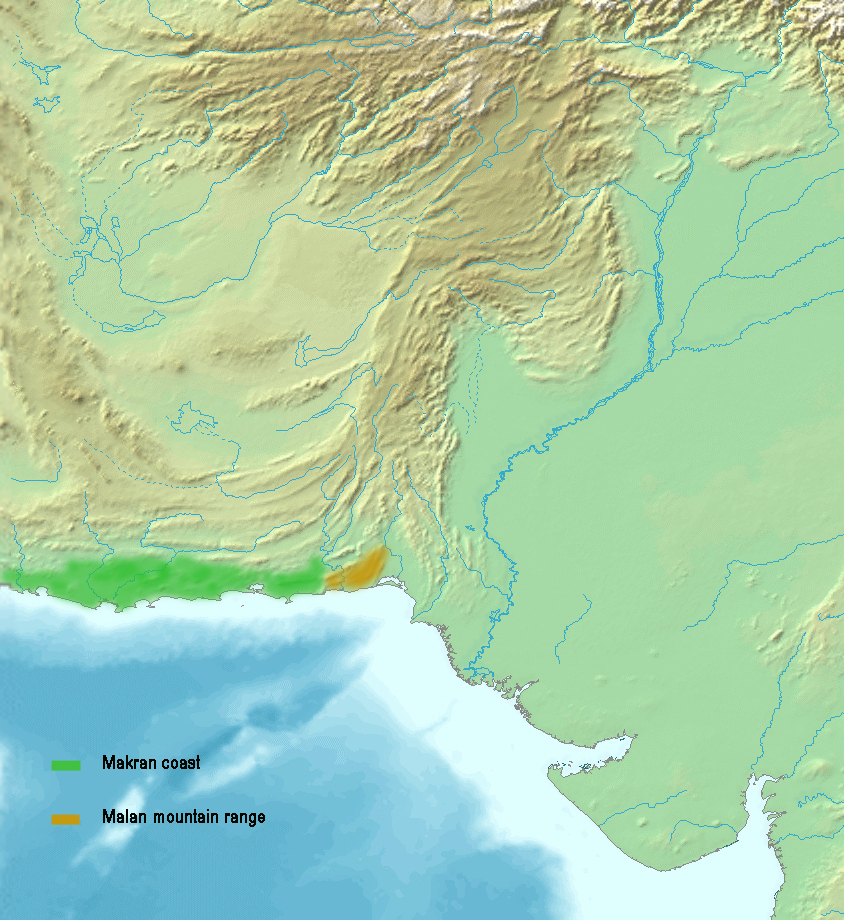
Makran coast, Pakistan, which according to Thomas Trautmann was ceded to Chandragupta, referreing to Smith (1924). Smith actually takes the Malan mountain range, which lies east of the Makran coast, as the western limit. (Note: Trautmann (2015, p. 235): "Seleucus ceded a vast territory, comprising most of what is now Afghanistan, plus southern Pakistan; the region of present-day Kabul (Paropamisadae), Kandahar (Arachosia) and Herat (Aria); and the Makran coast of Pakistan in the province of Baluchistan (Gedrosia )." Trautman refers to Smith (1924, pp. 158–160), "The extent of the cession of Ariana by Seleukos Nikator to Chandragupta Maurya," in Which Smith actually writes: "The satrapy of Gedrosia (or Gadrosia) extended far to the west, and probably only the eastern part of it was annexed by Chandragupta. The Malin range of mountains, which Alexander experienced such difficulty in crossing, would have furnished a natural boundary.")

With regard to Gedrosia, more recent authors mention either "Gedrosia," which gives the impression that Baluchistan as far as Iran was hand over, or '[the eastern] part of Gedrosia'. According to Thapar (1963), referring to Smith (1914), History of India,

"Certain areas in the north-west were acquired through the treaty with Seleucus. There is no absolute certainty as to which these areas were and it has been suggested (Note: Smith (1914), early History of India Third Edition, p.149: Appendix F, The Extent of the Cession of Ariana hy Seleukos Nikator to Chandragupta Maurya; Smith notes that he was criticised by a Mr.Bevan.) that the territory ceded consisted of Gedrosia, Arachosia, Aria [modern-day Herat], and the Paropamisadae."

In History of Early India, also from 1963, Thapar writes that "Some Seleucid territories that today would cover eastern Afghanistan, Baluchistan and Makran were ceded to the Maurya."

According to Kosmin, Seleucus "certainly" transferred "the eastern parts of Gedrosia." Thomas Trautmann includes the Makran Coast, referring to Smith (1924), and taking the Ashokan Edict of Kandahar as a validation for a maximum interpretation of Strabo. Smith actually takes the Malin range, east of the Makran coast, as the western limit, The validation by the Ashokan edicts is questioned by Coningham & Young and "a growing number of researchers," as the Ashokan edicts may rather point to the maximum extent of contact, and not of institutionalized control.

===== Lower Indus Valley =====
Coningham & Young also question the extent of control over the lower Indus Valley, following Thapar, noting that this may have been an area of peripheral control. Raymond Allchin also notes the absence of major cities in the lower Indus Valley. (Note: Haig (1894, p. 24): "...the general rising of the northern peoples headed by Chandragupta, the founder of the Maurya dynasty of Pataliputra, followed in rapid succession. The Lower Indus Valley now became free from foreign rule, and the local chiefs were no doubt left to their own devices. Nominally the territory may have been a dependency of the Mauryan kingdom, but, separated from the main body of that kingdom by a wide expanse of desert, and at a vast distance from the capital on the Ganges, its tie of allegiance must have been of the slightest. This independence, or semi-independence, lasted under no doubt varying degrees of definiteness […] till […] Demetrius, in the second century B.C., invaded Patalene in force and completely subjected it to Bactria.")

==== Paropamisadae (Gandhara and Kabul) and Arachosia (Kandahar) ====
According to Tarn, "the Paropamisadae itself was never Chandragupta's." Tarn, writing in 1922 before the discovery of the edicts of Ashoka in Kandahar and Laghman Province in the 1930s-60s, limits the exchanged territory to the Indus Valley. According to Tarn, the limit followed the Kunar river, east of Kabul and ending in Jalalabad, (Note: See this map) further south along the watershed, and ending at the Hingol river.

Kosmin writes that Seleucud "certainly" ceded Gandhara and Parapamisadae (this includes Gandhara), but "possibly" also Arachosia. Trautmann includes most of Afghanistan, including Herat, and Pakistan, noting that this extent has been doubted. He refers to Smith, stating that Smith "convincingly supported the veracity of the territorial cession," and arguing that the Ashokan inscription in Gandhara "confirmed the accuracy of the ancient testimony."

Coningham & Young question the extent of control over eastern Afghanistan, noting that "a growing number of researchers would now agree that the Ashokan edicts may have represented 'an area of maximum contact rather than streamlined bureaucratic control'."

==== Aria (Herat) ====
Interactive Map

The acquisition of Aria (modern Herat) is disputed. Smith included a large part of Aria, referring to Strabo and Pliny. Strabo XV, 1, 10:

the Indus River was the boundary between India and Ariana, which latter was situated next to India on the west and was in the possession of the Persians at that time; for later the Indians also held much of Ariana, having received it from the Macedonians.

Pliny the Elder (23/24–79 CE):

Most geographers, in fact, do not look upon India as bounded by the river Indus, but add to it the four satrapies of the Gedrosia, the Arachotë, the Aria, and the Paropamisadë, the River Cophes [Kabul River], thus forming the extreme boundary of India. According to other writers, however, all these territories, are reckoned as belonging to the country of the Aria.

Smith reads Strabo XV 1,10 as implying that "Strabo informs us that the cession included a large part of Ariane." He further argues that Pliny, in his treatment of the borders of India, when referring to various authors who "include in India the four satrapies of Gedrosia, Arachosia, Aria, and the Paropanisadae," this

...must have been based on the fact that at some period previous to A.D. 77, when his book was published, these four provinces were actually reckoned as part of India. At what time other than the period of the Mauryan dynasty is it possible that these provinces should have formed part of India?

According to Tarn, explicitly criticising Smith for his interpretation of the extent of Aria, (Note: Tarn (1922, p. 100, and note 1): "Extravagant ideas have been put forard as to what Seleucus did cede [...] The worst has been that of V. A. Smith, who gave Chandragupta the satrapies of Gedrosia, Arachosia, Paropamisadae, and Aria on the strength of Pliny VI, 69, a historical absurdity of unknown origin.") the idea that Seleucus handed over more than what is now eastern Afghanistan is an exaggeration originating in a statement by Pliny the Elder in his Geographia VI, 69, referring not specifically to the lands received by Chandragupta, but rather to the various opinions of geographers regarding the definition of the word "India."

According to Kosmin, Seleucid "possibly" gave away "Aria as far as Herat." According to Raychaudhuri & Mukherjee, Aria "has been wrongly included in the list of ceded satrapies by some scholars [...] on the basis of wrong assessments of the passage of Strabo [...] and a statement by Pliny." According to John D. Grainger, "Seleucus "must [...] have held Aria", and furthermore, his "son Antiochos was active there fifteen years later." According to Sherwin-White and Kuhrt (1993), "The region of Aria is definitely known to have been Seleucid under Seleucus I and Antiochus I as it definitely was after Antiochus III's great campaign in the east against the Parthians and Bactrians. [...] There is no evidence whatever that it did not remain Seleucid, like Drangiana, with which it is linked by easy routes." (Note: "For more than a century, the Seleucids remained in control of the [Drangiana] region. [...] Drangiana was conquered by the Parthians.")

=== Military consequences ===
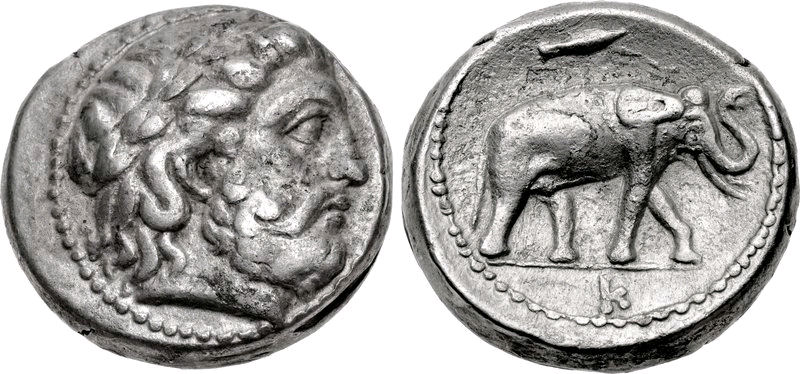
Seleukos I Nikator. 312–281 BC. AR Stater (22 mm, 16.88 g, 12 h). Susa mint. Struck circa 288/7 BC. Head of Zeus right, wearing laurel wreath / Elephant advancing right; above, spearhead right.

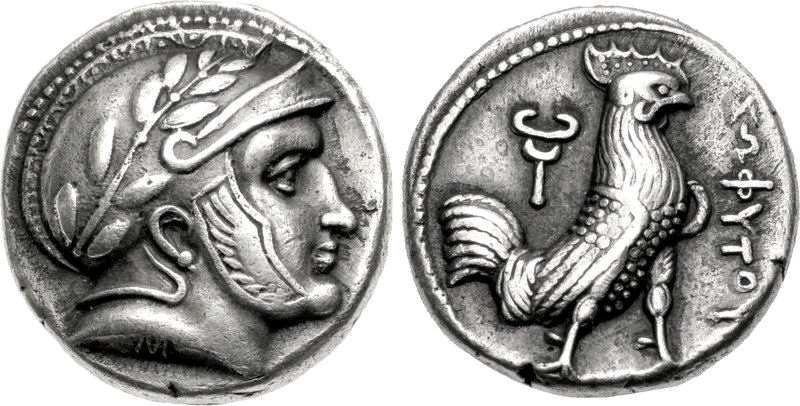
Sophytes may have been the Mauryan satrap of Arachosia, succeeding Sibyrtius, after Seleucus had ceded the Hellenistic territory of Arachosia to Chandragupta Maurya in the Seleucid–Mauryan war (305–303 BC).

The arrangement proved to be mutually beneficial. The border between the Seleucid and Mauryan Empires remained stable in subsequent generations, and friendly diplomatic relations are reflected by the ambassador Megasthenes, and by the envoys sent westward by Chandragupta's grandson Ashoka. Chandragupta's gift of war elephants "may have alleviated the burden of fodder and the return march" and allowed him to appropriately reduce the size and cost of his large army, since the major threats to his power had now all been removed.

With the war elephants acquired from the Mauryas, Seleucus was able to defeat his rival, Antigonus, along with his allies at the Battle of Ipsus. Adding Antigonus's territories to his own, Seleucus would found the Seleucid Empire, which would endure as a great power in the Mediterranean and the Middle East until 64 BC.

Mauryan control of territory in what is now Afghanistan helped guard against invasion of India from the northwest. Chandragupta Maurya went on to expand his rule in India southward into the Deccan.

While Seleucus surrendered territory west of the Indus and in Afghanistan, he was accepted by satraps of the eastern provinces in present-day Iran. His Iranian wife, Apama, may have helped him implement his rule in Bactria and Sogdiana.

== See also ==
- Kalinga War
- Nanda–Mauryan War
- Shunga–Greek War
- Indo-Greek Wars
- List of wars involving India
- Military history of India

== Sources ==
- Allchin, F. R. (1995), "The Mauryan State and Empire", in Allchin, F. R.; Erdosy, George (eds.), The Archaeology of Early Historic South Asia: The Emergence of Cities and States, Cambridge University Press, ISBN 978-0-521-37695-2
- Basham, A. L. (1986) [1954]. The Wonder That Was India. Rupa & Co.
- Coningham, Robin; Young, Ruth (2015). The Archaeology of South Asia: From the Indus to Asoka, c.6500 BCE–200 CE. Cambridge University Press. ISBN 978-1-316-41898-7.
- Cummings, Lewis Vance (2004). Alexander the Great. Grove Press.
- Eggermont, Pierre (1975). Alexander's Campaigns in Sind and Baluchistan and the Siege of the Brahman Town of Harmatelia. Peeters Publishers. ISBN 978-90-6186-037-2.
- Grainger, John D. (2014), Seleukos Nikator: Constructing a Hellenistic Kingdom, Routledge, ISBN 978-1-317-80099-6
- Grant, R. G. (2010). Commanders: History's Greatest Military Leaders. DK Publishing. ISBN 978-0-7566-7341-3.
- Haig, Malcolm Robert (1894). The Indus Delta Country: A Memoir, Chiefly on Its Ancient Geography and History. K. Paul, Trench, Trübner & Company, Limited.
- Jansari, Sushma (2023). Chandragupta Maurya: The creation of a national hero in India. UCL Press.
- Keay, John (2018) [2000]. India: A History. Harper Perennial. p. 84. ISBN 978-0006387848.
- Kosmin, Paul J. (2014), The Land of the Elephant Kings: Space, Territory, and Ideology in Seleucid Empire, Harvard University Press, ISBN 978-0-674-72882-0
- Kulke, Hermann; Rothermund, Dietmar (2016). A History of India (6th ed.). Routledge. ISBN 978-1138961159.
- Raychaudhuri, Hem Chandra; Mukherjee, B.N. (1997) [1923]. Political history of ancient India, from the accession of Parikshit to the extinction of the Gupta dynasty (eight ed.). Oxford University Press India.
- Sherwin-White, Susan; Kuhrt, Amelie (1993). From Samarkhand to Sardis: A New Approach to the Seleucid Empire. University of California Press.
- Smith, V.A. (1914). The Early History Of India Third Edition (third ed.). Oxford University Press.
- Smith, V.A. (1924). The Early History Of India Fourth Edition (fourth ed.). Oxford University Press.
- Tarn, W. W. (1922). The Greeks in Bactria and India. Cambridge University Press.
- Thapar, Romila (1963). Asoka and the Decline of the Mauryas. Oxford University Press.
- Thapar, Romila (2004). Early India: From the Origins to AD 1300. University of California Press. ISBN 978-0520242258.
- Trautmann, Thomas (2015). Elephants and Kings: An Environmental History. The University of Chicago Press. ISBN 978-0-226-26436-3.
- Wheatley, Pat; Heckel, Waldemar (2011), ""Commentary (Book 15)"", Justin: Epitome of the Philippic History of Pompeius Trogus: Volume II, Oxford University Press, ISBN 978-0-19-927759-9
