= Elephas (ancient) =

Elephas (Ancient Greek: Ἐλέφας; "Elephant") was the name of a coastal mountain or cape on the Horn of Africa that appears in the geographical works of Strabo, the Periplus of the Erythraean Sea and Ptolemy. A different mountain of the same name also appears in a legendary account set in ancient India in Pseudo-Plutarch.

== Africa ==
According to Strabo, Mount Elephas was a mountain projecting into the sea. It was followed by a creek, the large harbour of Psygmus, the watering place of Cynocephali, and the promontory Notu ceras (Νότου κέρας; "Southern Horn").

In the Periplus of the Erythraean Sea, Cape Elephas is described as lying between the Little Nile River and the Elephant River.

In Ptolemy's Geography, Ptolemy states that the coast from the Persian Gulf to Elephas Mountain was known as Troglodytike, while the coast beyond it as far as Rhapton Promontory was called Azania.

== India ==
A different Mount Elephas appears in Pseudo-Plutarch's Names of Rivers and Mountains in India. According to tradition, the mountain's name originated from a legendary event. During Alexander the Great's campaign in India, King Porus's elephant was stung by a gadfly and ran to the summit of the "Mountain of the Sun". There, it spoke in a human voice, urging Porus not to oppose Alexander because he was descended from Zeus, before dying. After this, Porus made peace with Alexander and named the mountain Elephas (Greek for "elephant") in honor of the animal.
