= Calinipaxa =

Calinipaxa(कलिनिपक्ष) is a city in northern India described in ancient sources, and thought to be the modern Kanouge (Kannauj), on the Ganges. It was first made known to the West through the expeditions of Seleucus Nicator to India in 303 BCE.

"The other parts of the country [beyond the Hydaspes, the farthest extent of Alexander's conquests] were discovered & surveyed by Seleucus Nicator: namely
- from thence (the Hydaspes) to the Hesudrus 168 miles
- to the river Ioames as much: and some copies add 5 miles more therto
- from thence to Ganges 112 miles
- to Rhodapha 119, and some say, that between them two it is no less than 325 miles.
- From it to Calinipaxa, a great town 167 miles & a half, others say 265.
- And to the confluent of the rivers Iomanes and Ganges, where both meet together, 225 miles, and many put thereto 13 miles more
- from thence to the town Palibotta 425 miles
- and so to the mouth of Ganges where he falleth into the sea 638 miles."
Pliny the Elder, Natural history, Chap 21
