= Pandaie =

Daughter of Heracles in Greek mythology

In Greek mythology, Pandaie or Pandae (Ancient Greek: Πανδαίη) was a daughter of Heracles who was born in India, and became the ruler of a kingdom in South India. In the account of the historian Megasthenes, she was a queen of the Pandya dynasty.

== Mythology ==
Pandaie was said to have been assigned a kingdom in India by her father, who established specific laws for it, and to become its eponym. According to Megasthenes, she was also given by Heracles 500 elephants, 4000 horses and infantry of 130 000.

According to Pliny the Elder, Pandaie was the only female child of Heracles (which, however, contradicts the accounts that mention Macaria, Eucleia and Manto as his daughters), and was therefore especially favored by him. For that reason he made her queen of the Pandae, who since then became the only nation throughout India to be ruled by women. Pandaie's descendants, Pliny relates, reigned over three hundred cities and commanded an army of 5,100 plus five hundred elephants.

Polyaenus informs that Heracles allotted to Pandaie the southern part of India which is by the sea, subdividing it into 365 cantons and imposing on each a yearly tax that was to be paid on a certain fixed day of the year. Should a canton refuse to pay, other ones would be obliged to compensate the loss.

== See also ==
Meenakshi
