= Hinduism in Greece =

Modern Hinduism in Greece

Hindus in Greece
- The "Om" symbol in Devanagari

Total population
- 20,000 (2012) ▲

Regions with significant populations
- Athens metropolitan area

Religions
- Hinduism

Related ethnic groups
- Indians

Hinduism is a minority religion in Greece. Pew Research Center estimates the Hindu population in Greece to be approximately 20,000 in 2010. Hindus constituted less than 0.1% of the Greek population in a 2025 Pew study. The Greek state does not record religious affiliation in the census. Migration from South Asia since the 1970s has played an important role in the growth of Hinduism in Greece.

The first ISKCON temple opened in Athens in 1992. The current temple opened in 2019 and received official recognition in 2021. Hindus have benefited from improved India-Greece relations, and with the establishment of the Athens Center for Indian and Indo-Hellenistic Studies in 2016 as a hub for 'interdisciplinary study and critical analysis'.

Earlier, in the ancient era, Hinduism and Buddhism had greater influence due to closer Ancient Greece–Ancient India relations and the Indo-Greek Kingdom around 200 BC. In the medieval period, there appears to be no record of Hinduism in Greece. Modern Greek Indology began around 1786, when Greek scholar Dimitrios Galanos traveled to India and learned Sanskrit; his Greek translations of Hindu texts, including the Bhagavad Gita, were published posthumously around the 1850s.

== History ==
Greek encounters with India and Hinduism date back to the ancient era. Niki Papageorgiou and Angeliki Ziaka, in the Handbook of Hinduism in Europe, trace these encounters to campaigns of Alexander the Great and the Hellenistic kingdoms that subsequently emerged in Bactria and north-western India. The Hindu scriptures, the Mahabharata and Ramayana also contain references to Yavanas, a term associated in this period with Greeks.

In the ancient era, Hinduism likely had greater influence due to closer Ancient Greece–Ancient India relations, including mythological aspects. Megasthenes wrote about the prehistoric arrival of the god Dionysus in India, as did Apollodorus in Bibliotheca.

The Indo-Greek Kingdom consisted of various Hellenistic states around 200 BC, ruling from regional capitals like Taxila, Sagala, Pushkalavati, and Bagram. Other centers are only hinted at; for example Ptolemy's Geographia and the nomenclature of later kings suggest that Theophilus in the south of the Indo-Greek sphere of influence may also have had a royal seat there at one time. The Greeks to the east of the Seleucid Empire were eventually divided into the Graeco-Bactrian Kingdom and the Indo-Greek Kingdoms in the north-western Indian Subcontinent.

During the medieval period, present-day Greece was under the Ottoman Empire from the mid-15th century until the modern First Hellenic Republic was formed in 1822, and almost no record of Hinduism appears during that period.

Modern Greek Indology began, in practice, with the Athenian scholar Dimitrios Galanos (1760–1833). Galanos traveled to Bengal in 1786, where he learned Sanskrit, and later settled in Varanasi. His translations were published posthumously by Georgios Typaldos in seven volumes between 1845 and 1853, including the Bhagavad Gita and Devi Mahatmya.

Indian migration to Greece gradually started in the early 1970s, bringing with it increasing religious diversity. Interest in Indian religion and philosophy revived in Greece from the late 20th century. Papageorgiou and Ziaka distinguish groups focused on modern Hindu practice from those concerned with older Greek–Indian philosophical links. Institutional interest in Indian studies also grew in parallel. ELINEPA was founded in 2003.

== Demographics ==
The Greek state does not collect formal statistics on religious demographics, thus estimates of the Hindu population rely on other sources. Pew Research Center’s 2012 global religious composition report estimated Greece's Hindu population at 20,000 (0.1 per cent of the total population). Pew's updated 2020 estimates, published in 2025, continued to place the total Hindu population of Greece at <0.1 per cent.

== Hindu organisations ==
ISKCON, Satyananda Yoga, Sahaja Yoga, Brahma Kumaris and Sathya Sai Baba organizations are active in Greece.

In 1992, Italian ISKCON devotee Dayanidhi Prabhu brought Srila Prabhupada’s Murti to Athens and had an installation ceremony; in 2019, he opened the current temple in the center of Athens, giving classes every morning and evening and also holding Sunday feasts, subsequently getting all legal permissions from the Greek government in 2021.

=== Sahaja Yoga ===
Sahaja Yoga was founded by Shri Mataji Nirmala Devi in 1970. "Saha" means "with" and "ja" means born, born with you and "yoga" is the union with the all-pervading power of Divine love. Another meaning of Sahaja is spontaneous. So, Sahaja Yoga means spontaneous union with the Divine. It is a method of meditation by which one can achieve mental, emotional, physical, and spiritual wellbeing.

In Sahaja Yoga, self-realization is the key and a person gains self-realization when the kundalini energy within us is awakened.

=== Satyananda Yoga ===
Yoga is gaining popularity in Greece, in particular the Satyananda Yoga and Sahaja Yoga branches. Satyananda Yoga was founded by Swami Satyananda. Swami Satyananda assigned Swami Sivamurti to carry the message of yoga to Greece. Through his inspiration and guidance, in 1978 Swami Sivamurti instituted Satyanandashram Hellas (beginning at Kalamata and then expanding to Athens, Thessaloniki and other parts of the Greek mainland and islands). The present Ashram of Satyanandashram Hellas was established in 1984 outside the town of Paiania and inaugurated by Swami Satyananda the following year. In 1984 and 1985 Swami Satyananda visited Greece and inspired countless aspirants with the ancient message, 'Know Thyself'. During these tours, he expounded the wisdom of yoga and tantra in a series of teachings on spiritual life, and revealed yoga as the priceless heritage of humanity.

The Garuda Hellas publishing house was established in 2007 and is based in Thessaloniki, Greece. Small in size, Garuda Hellas offers educational materials and personalized support through its books for each yoga student. It imports yoga books in English, primarily from the Bihar School of Yoga, India. Garuda Hellas also translates and publishes yoga books in Greek, so that the wisdom of yoga can be objectively and scientifically presented to all Greek-speaking people.

=== ISKCON ===
ISKCON (acronym for the International Society for Krishna Consciousness) has a few devotees in Greece. It has been active since 1970. In 2012, it was recognised by the Ministry of Religion. ISKCON has only one branch in Athens, Greece. ISKCON Greece has the status of a church, a "house of prayer" and is recognized as such by the Greek Ministry of Religion.

== Public life ==
=== Church of Greece and Yoga ===
In June 2015, prior to the inaugural International Day of Yoga, the Holy Synod of the Church of Greece issued a press release. It advised Orthodox believers that yoga was a fundamental part of the Hindu faith, as opposed to merely 'a type of exercise'. The press release also deplored that yoga was incompatible with the Orthodox Christian faith and had no place in the lives of Christians. In June 2020, after the Greek media suggested yoga as a means to relieve stress during the COVID-19 pandemic, the Holy Synod once again restated its 2015 position.

=== Cremation ===
Cremation was prohibited in Greece prior to 2006. In March 2006 the Greek Parliament passed legislation to allow cremation for individuals whose religion or conscience permitted it. The Indian ambassador to Greece welcomed the change on behalf of the Hindu and Sikh residents of Greece. Prior to this change in law Hindu families incurred costs of up to €3,000 to repatriate bodies to India for cremation. Despite cremation being legalised in 2006, Greece’s first crematorium opened in Ritsona, Boeotia on 30 September 2019. The delay had been attribute to opposition from the Greek orthodox church.

== See also ==
- Religion in Greece
- Indo-Greeks
- Dimitrios Galanos
- India–Greece relations
