= Greece–India relations =

- Greece: India

Diplomatic mission
- Embassy of Greece, New Delhi: Embassy of India, Athens

Envoy
- Greek Ambassador to India Aliki Koutsomitopoulou: Indian Ambassador to Greece Rudrendra Tandon

Greece–India relations are the bilateral relations between India and Greece. Greece has an embassy in New Delhi. India has an embassy in Athens. As of 2023, the relation between the two countries is closer than ever and is considered historical and strategic by both parts.

== Historical relations ==
=== Ancient era ===
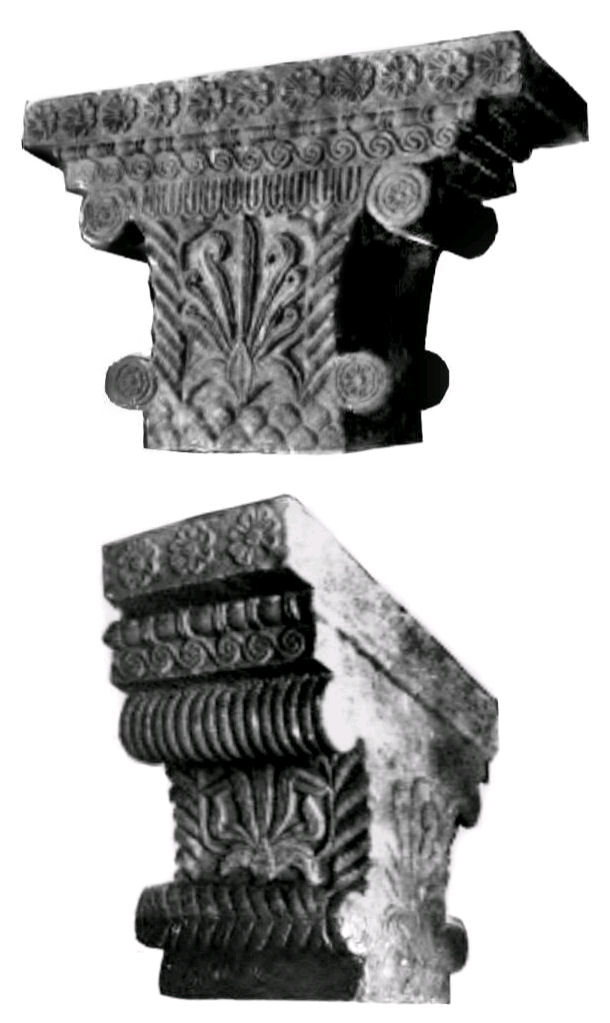
Pataliputra Palace capital, showing Greek influence, early Mauryan Empire period, 3rd century BC.

For the ancient Greeks, "India" (Greek: Ινδία) referred to the polity situated east of Persia and south of the Himalayas (with the exception of Serica). However, during different periods of history, "India" referred to a much wider or much less extensive place. The Greeks referred to the ancient Indians as "Indoi" (Greek: Ἰνδοί, lit. 'people of the Indus River'). The Vedic Aryans referred to the Greeks as "Yavanas", or Yona or Yonaka, in reference to the Ionians. "Yawan" is a Hebrew term that refers to the ancient Greeks. The inscriptions in Pali texts trace the Prakrit equivalent of the Sanskrit word "Yavana" as "Yona." It is suggested that the Indians took the word either from the Persians (who called the Greeks Yaunas) or from some Semitic language.

=== Art and literature ===
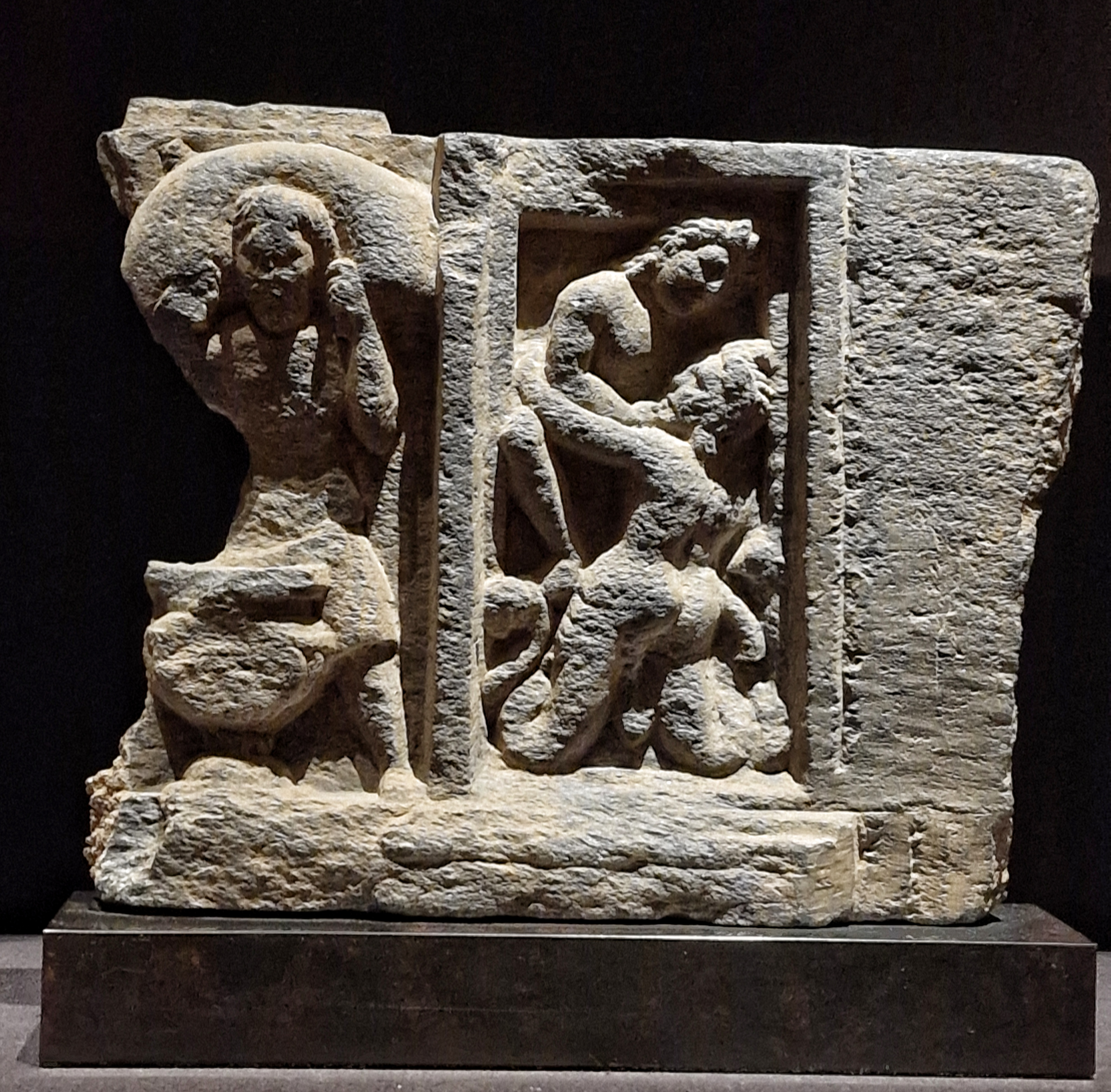
Some of the iconography and motifs of Gandharan art reveal its influences from the Greek art. The Greek god Triton; the Dionysian motif of youth holding a leather pouch filled with wine; or cupids bearing garlands of flowers. From 2nd-3rd century, now in National Museum of Korea.

In Greek Anthology, India and Indians are mentioned on many occasions. In Sophocles' play Antigone, Creon mentions the gold of India. The satirist Lucian wrote that Indians get drunk very easily with wine and they get worse than any Greek or Roman would be.

The Yavana Ganika (Greek Ganika) was a common sight in India (Gaṇikā in India was similar to a Hetaira in the Greek world). These girls were also trained in the theatrical arts. The Indian theater had adopted some elements of Greek comedy. Kalidasa mention the Yayanis (Greek maidens) in his work.

Hellenistic influence on Indian art is well documented. Gandhara art was heavily influenced by the Greek style. The Art of Mathura is a blend of Indian and Greek art. The Pompeii Yakshii, an Indian sculpture of a Yakshii, was found in the ruins of Roman Pompeii. Bharhut Yavana is a relief, discovered among the reliefs of the railings around the Bharhut Stupa, representing a Greek warrior.

At the Nasik Caves, some of the caves were built by people with Greek heritage. The murals in the Ajanta Caves are painted in such a way which suggest a Greek influence.

=== Astronomy and astrology ===
Greek astronomical texts were translated from Jyotisha Shastra Sanskrit pertaining of Surya Siddhanta and other works by different Indian scholars. Similar to most books of philosophy, mathematics from Sanskrit literature made its way into Greece by trade.

=== Philosophy and religion ===
==== Pyrrhonism ====
The philosopher Pyrrho accompanied Alexander the Great on his Indian campaign. According to Diogenes Laërtius, Pyrrho developed his philosophy, now known as Pyrrhonism, in India when he was there. Diogenes Laërtius wrote that Anaxarchus, Pyrrho's teacher, met and spoke with Indian gymnosophists and magi. In the view of Christopher I. Beckwith, Pyrrho's philosophy was strikingly similar to the Buddhist three marks of existence, suggesting that his teaching was influenced by contact with Buddhism.

Because of the high degree of similarity between Nāgārjuna's philosophy and Pyrrhonism, particularly the surviving works of Sextus Empiricus, Nāgārjuna was likely influenced by Greek Pyrrhonist texts imported to India.

==== Buddhism ====
Buddhism flourished under the Indo-Greeks, leading to the Greco-Buddhist cultural syncretism. The iconography of Vajrapani is clearly that of the hero Heracles, with varying degrees of hybridization. Menander I was one of the patrons of Buddhism; he was also the subject of the Milinda Panha and is mentioned on the Shinkot casket. It has been claimed (by G. R. Sharma) that Menander is mentioned in the Reh Inscription, but other scholars disagree. Many Greek rulers after Menander had the description "Maharajasa dhramikasa" (follower of the Dharma) next to their name on their coinage; this does not necessarily imply that they were Buddhists or that Buddhism was dominant in their kingdom, as symbols of the Greek religion were also on the same coins, but it does indicate that Buddhism played a significant role. Buddhist manuscripts in cursive Greek, dated later than the 2nd century AD, have been found in Afghanistan. Some mention the "Lokesvararaja Buddha" (λωγοασφαροραζοβοδδο).

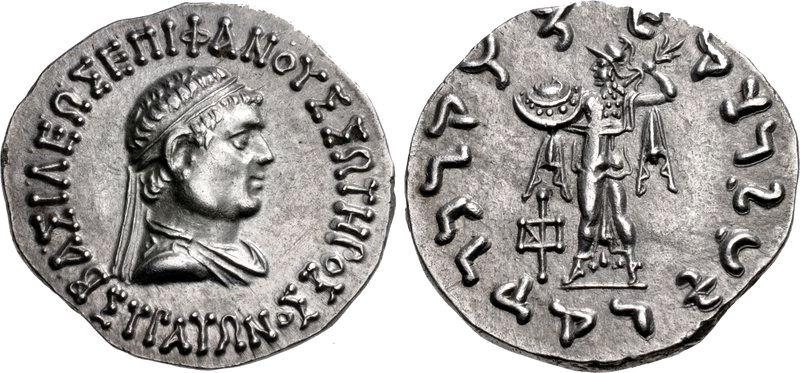
Coin of Strato I. Obv. Bust of Strato. Greek legend: ΒΑΣΙΛΕΩΣ ΣΩΤΗΡΟΣ ΚΑΙ ΔΙΚΑΙΟΥ ΣΤΡΑΤΩΝΟΣ "of king saviour and just/ righteous Strato". Rev. Athena throwing thunderbolt. Pali legend: Maharajasa tratarasa Dhramikasa Stratasa "Great saviour king Strato, follower of the Dharma".

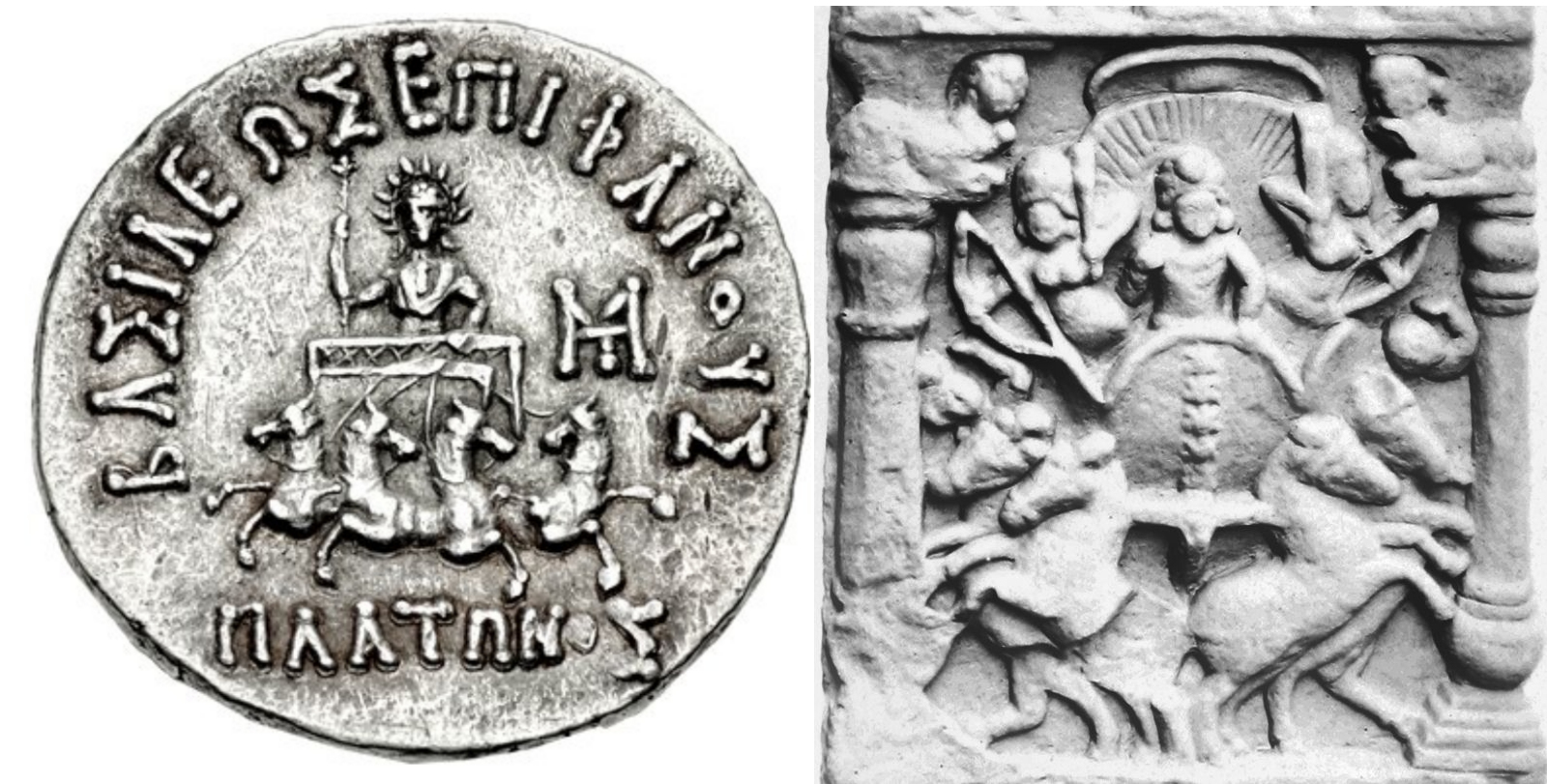
Coin of Plato of Bactria with the god Helios (left) and sculpture of Surya at Bodh Gaya (right).

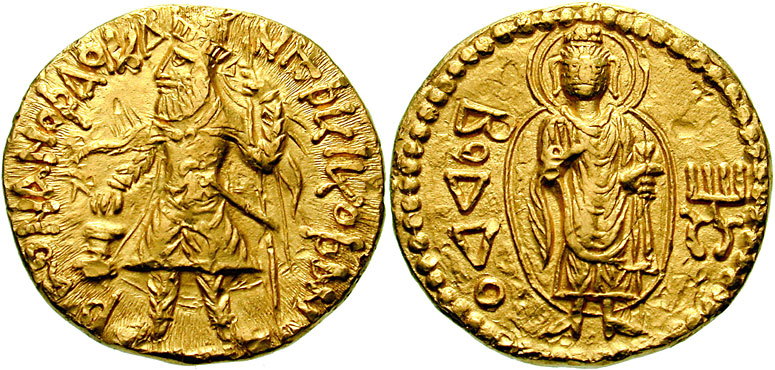
Kanishka coin with Greek lettering "ΒΟΔΔΟ" (i.e. Buddha), Kushan Empire, 2nd century CE.

Dharmaraksita was a Greek who converted to Buddhism. He was one of the missionaries sent by the Mauryan emperor Ashoka to proselytize Buddhism. Mahadharmaraksita was a Greek Buddhist master who, according to Mahāvaṃsa traveled to Anuradhapura in Sri Lanka together with 30,000 Greek Buddhist monks from Alexandria of the Caucasus. Mahāvaṃsa also mentions how early Buddhists from Sri Lanka went to Alexandria of the Caucasus to learn Buddhism.

The Kandahar Greek Edicts of Ashoka, which are among Ashoka's Major Rock Edicts, were written in the Greek language. In addition, the Kandahar Bilingual Rock Inscription was written in Greek and Aramaic. The emperor Ashoka used the word "eusebeia" (piety) as a Greek translation for the central Buddhist and Hindu concept of "dharma" in the Kandahar Bilingual Rock Inscription.

Buddhist gravestones from Ptolemaic Egypt have been found in Alexandria decorated with depictions of the dharma wheel, showing the presence of Buddhists in Hellenistic Egypt. Ptolemy II Philadelphus is mentioned in the Edicts of Ashoka as a recipient of the Buddhist proselytism of Ashoka:

Now it is conquest by Dhamma that Beloved-Servant-of-the-Gods considers to be the best conquest. And it [conquest by Dhamma] has been won here, on the borders, even six hundred yojanas away, where the Greek king Antiochos rules, beyond there where the four kings named Ptolemy, Antigonos, Magas and Alexander rule, likewise in the south among the Cholas, the Pandyas, and as far as Tamraparni. Rock Edict Nb13 (S. Dhammika)

=== Political and military ===
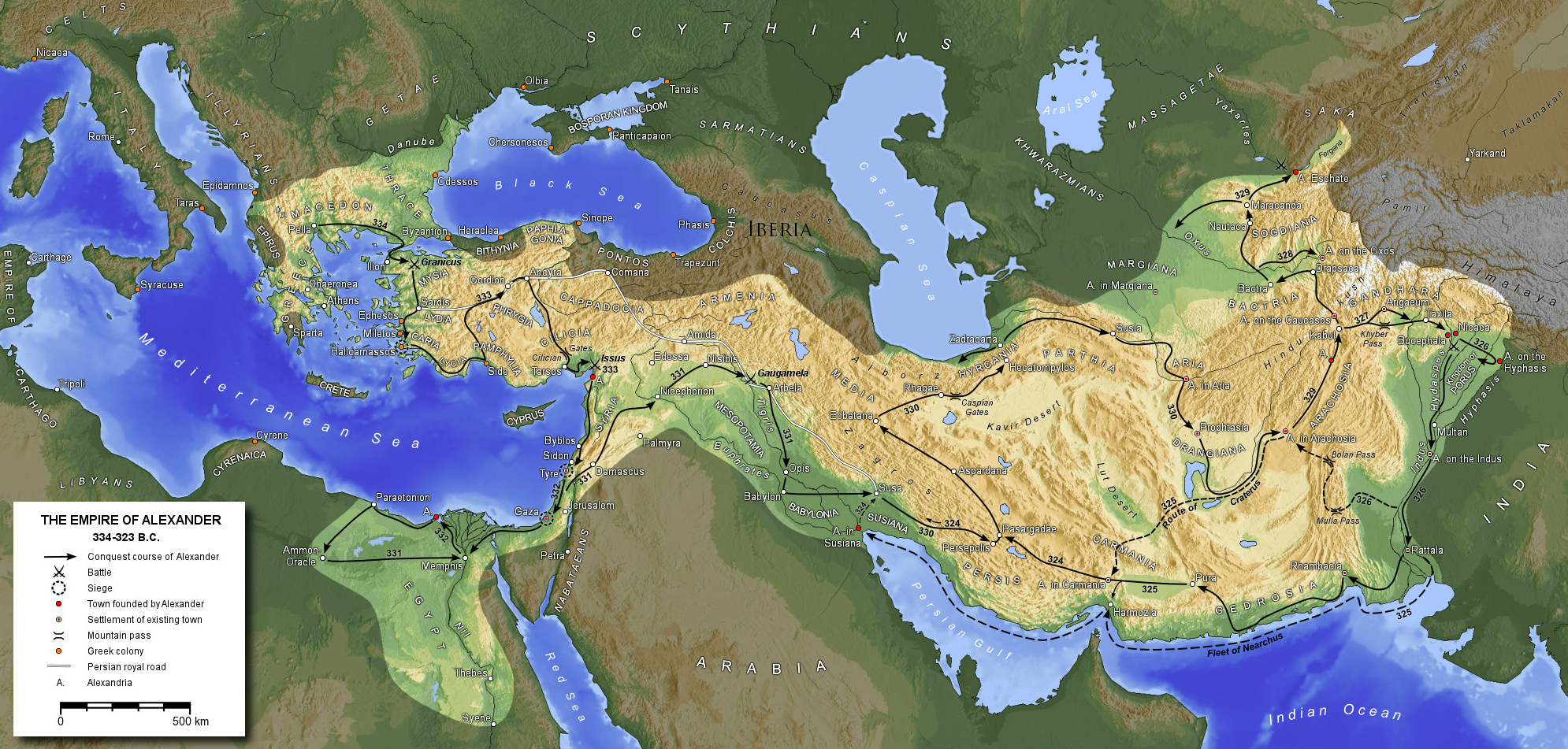
Map of Alexander the Great's empire and the route he, Pyrrho, Anaxarchus, and Onesicritus took to India.

During the Second Persian invasion of Greece, the Persian army had Indian troops, both infantry and cavalry.

Indo-Greek kingdoms and Greco-Bactrian Kingdoms were founded by the successors of Alexander the Great (Greek conquests in India). Yavana era describes the period with Greek presence in India.

According to Indian sources, Greek troops seem to have assisted Chandragupta Maurya in toppling the Nanda Dynasty and founding the Mauryan Empire.

Later, Seleucus I's army encountered Chandragupta's army. Chandragupta and Seleucus finally concluded an alliance. Seleucus gave him his daughter in marriage, ceded the territories of Arachosia, Herat, Kabul and Makran and received 500 war elephants.

Bindusara, the second Mauryan emperor of India, had diplomatic relations with and very friendly feelings towards the Greeks. He even asked Antiochus I Soter to send him a Greek sophist for his court.

Megasthenes had traveled to India and had several interviews with Chandragupta Maurya, known as Sandracottus to the Greeks.

Ptolemy II Philadelphus is recorded by Pliny the Elder as having sent an ambassador named Dionysius to the Mauryan court at Pataliputra in India, probably to Emperor Ashoka:

"But [India] has been treated of by several other Greek writers who resided at the courts of Indian kings, such, for instance, as Megasthenes, and by Dionysius, who was sent thither by Philadelphus expressly for the purpose: all of whom have enlarged upon the power and vast resources of these nations." Pliny the Elder, "The Natural History", Chap. 21

Asoka also appointed some Greeks to high offices of state (Yavanaraja, meaning Greek King or Governor), for example, the Tushaspha. In addition, his edicts mention a Yona (Greek) province on the north-west border of India, most probably the Arachosia.

Polybius wrote about the use of Indian elephants in battles and about the alliance between the Indian king Sophagasenus and Antiochus III the Great.

Diodorus, quoting Iambulus, mentioned that the king of Pataliputra had a "great love for the Greeks".

The Greek historian Apollodorus and the Roman historian Justin, affirmed that the Bactrian Greeks conquered India. Justin also described Demetrius I as "King of the Indians". Greek and Indian sources indicate the Greeks campaigned as far as Pataliputra until they were forced to retreat following a coup in Bactria in 170 BC.

The Heliodorus pillar is a stone column erected around 110 BCE in present-day central India in Vidisha, by Heliodorus (Greek: Ἡλιόδωρος), a Greek ambassador of the Indo-Greek king Antialcidas to the court of the Shunga king Bhagabhadra. The site is located about 5 miles from the Buddhist stupa of Sanchi.

The King Phraotes received a Greek education at the court of his father and spoke Greek fluently.

Stephanus of Byzantium called the city Daedala in India an Indo-Cretan city, most probably because it was a settlement of Cretan mercenaries.

Tamil poems described the Greek soldiers who served as mercenaries for Indian kings as "the valiant-eyed Yavanas, whose bodies were strong and of terrible aspect".

Alfred Charles Auguste Foucher said that some of the troops of Mara in the Gandhara sculptures may represent Greek mercenaries.

The Cilappatikaram mentions Yavana soldiers, who, according to scholars, including Professor Dikshitar, is a reference to the Greek mercenaries employed by the Tamil kings.

=== 18–19th century ===
The settlement of Greek merchants in Bengal began in the early eighteenth century and lasted until the middle of the twentieth century.

The trading house of the Ralli Brothers which operated in Kolkata and Dhaka was the most important Greek business presence in India during the 19th and 20th centuries.

Dimitrios Galanos (Greek: Δημήτριος Γαλανός, 1760–1833) was the first modern Greek Indologist who lived for 40 years in India and translated many Sanskrit texts into Greek making available the knowledge of the philosophical and literary traditions of India in Greece and the rest of the world.

The church, cemetery and property of the Greek community of Bengal are currently managed by the Charitable Foundation of the Greek Orthodox Church in Kolkata.

DNA analysis from the skeletons of the Roopkund Lake, revealed that 14 skeletons (dated ~1800 CE) had a genetic ancestry tied to Greece.

=== Modern ===
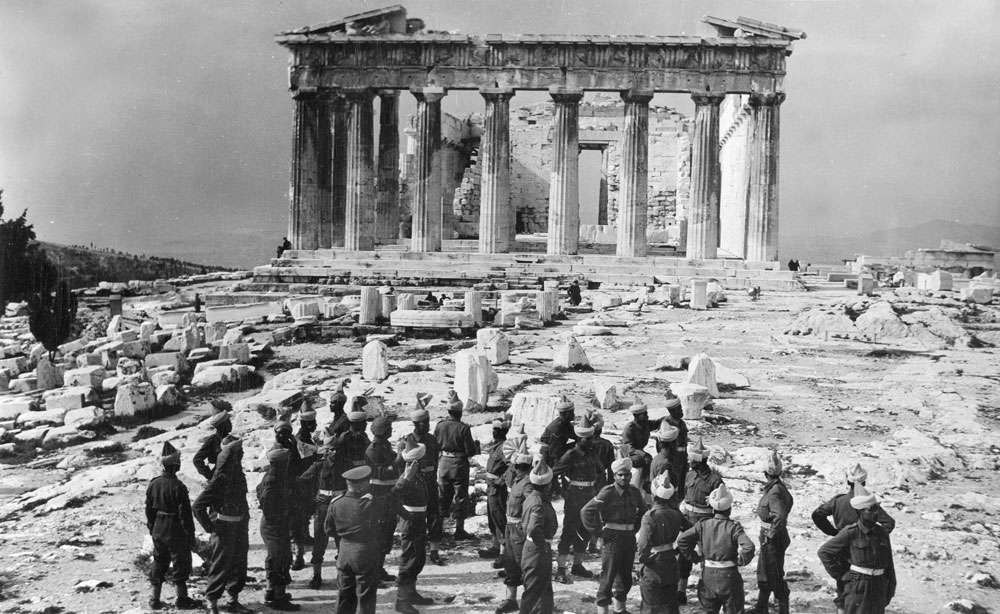
5th Indian Infantry Brigade tour the Acropolis in 1944.

Diplomatic relations between Greece and India started in May 1950. India opened its resident embassy in Athens in March 1978. The new Greek Embassy building in New Delhi was inaugurated on 6 February 2001.

The graves of Indians who died in Greece during the two World Wars are located in the memorial grounds of the cemeteries of the Allied Forces in Athens, Thessaloniki and Lemnos.

Thessaloniki was twinned with Kolkata in January 2005.

India and Greece enjoy close bilateral relations and Greece supports India's candidacy as a permanent member of the United Nations Security Council.

The two nations are closer than ever amidst their shared rivalry with Turkey. Greece is one of the few nations which openly support India on the Kashmir issue. In 2023, India and Greece along with Cyprus and Israel also formed an informal economic partnership for extraction of oil in Western Mediterranean.

=== Cultural relations ===
On 26 November 1926, Nobel Laureate Poet Rabindranath Tagore visited Athens.

The "Dimitrios Galanos" Chair for Greek Studies was established at Jawaharlal Nehru University in New Delhi, India in September 2000.

The official language of India, Hindi, has been taught at the Foreign Language Teaching Center of the National and Kapodistrian University of Athens since 2005.

Sanskrit, Hindi, Indian philosophy and South Asian history and Culture have been taught at the Athens Center for Indian and Indo-Hellenic Studies since 2016.

In March and April 1995, the Indian Council for Cultural Relations (ICCR) and the Hellenic Foundation for Culture co-organized an International Symposium on "India – Greece: 2500 Years of Cultural Exchange" at the India International Center in New Delhi.

In February 2018, Indira Gandhi National Center for the Arts (IGNCA) and Benares Hindu University (BHU) organized an international conference entitled "Dimitrios Galanos and his Legacy: Indo-Greek Studies 1790–2018" held in two phases, one in New Delhi and one in Varanasi, India.

In November 2018, Europe's 1st International Symposium on Jainism was organized by ELINEPA at the Corfu Museum of Asian Art.

In June 2019, the 17th International Hindi Conference was organized by ELINEPA in Athens.

On 26 June 2021, the ministers of external affairs of Greece and India Nikos Dendias and S. Jaishankar and the mayor of Athens Kostas Bakoyannis unveiled the statue of Mahatma Gandhi in Athens.

In November 2021, ELINEPA and the Indian Council for Cultural Relations (ICCR) co-organized a painting exhibition and a series of cultural events in New Delhi and Chandigarh as part of the celebrations for the 200th anniversary of the Greek Revolution.

On 1 March 2022, a conferment ceremony was organized in Athens to present the Padma Shri Award from the president of India Ram Nath Kovind to the Greek Indologist Prof. Nicholas Kazanas for his distinguished service and contribution towards the enrichment of literature and education.

In December 2022, the chair for Greek Studies at Jawaharlal Nehru University and the Hellenic Institute of Byzantine and Post-Byzantine Studies (Venice) co-organized an International Conference on: "The Greek World and India: History, Culture and Trade from Hellenistic Period to Modern Times' at Jawaharlal Nehru University Conference Centre, New Delhi.

In June 2023, the Academy of Athens organized an Event on: "The research work of Indologist Miltiadis Spyrou and the unknown publications of Demetrios Galanos in India".

In April 2024, the chair for Greek Studies at Jawaharlal Nehru University in collaboration with the Aristotle University of Thessaloniki, the International Hellenic University and the National & Kapodistrian University of Athens organized a multi-disciplinary International Conference on “Greece and India: History, Society, Science and Entrepreneurship”

== Economic relations ==
About 35,000 to 36,000 Indian people live and work in Greece.

Annual bilateral trade stands at $0,83 billion. The figures from the Hellenic Statistical Authority (ELSTAT) indicate that the trade balance is consistently in deficit to the detriment of Greece. In 2021, a deficit of €564,8 million was recorded as Greek exports amounted to €134,2 million, recording a significant increase of 74,6% compared to 2020, while imports to €699,1 million, recording an increase of 68,4% compared to 2020.

Some Indian companies, like restaurants, mini markets and tourist agents, have started operating in Athens, Myconos, Santorini and other places in Greece. Greek companies also have partners in India.

An infrastructure consortium made up of India's GMR Airports Limited (GAL) and Greek GEK Terna has won the tender for the construction of the new Kastelli airport in Heraklion, Crete.

India has been an honored country at the 74th (2009) and the 84th (2019) Thessaloniki International Fair.

The first Greek Indian Business Association was established in Athens in June 2019.

Following the concluded 2026 EU-India free trade deal, Greece has an open door to India's huge market. Greek ports and shipping are being positioned as gateways between India and Europe, and cooperation is expanding into sectors like technology, infrastructure and tourism, all highlighted ahead of Prime Minister Kyriakos Mitsotakis’s upcoming visit to India.

== List of recent bilateral visits ==
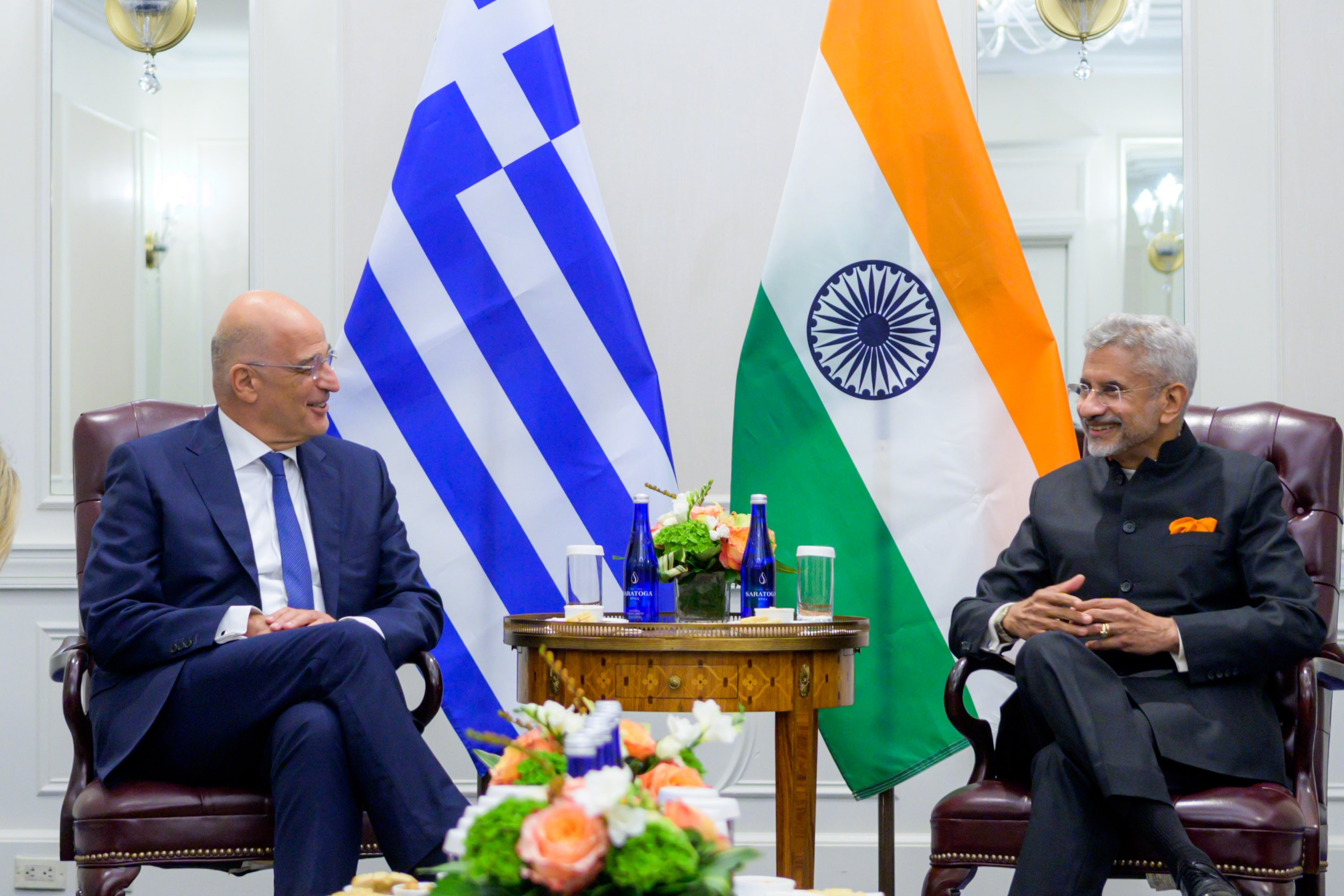
Foreign Minister of Greece Nikos Dendias and Minister of External Affairs of India S. Jaishankar, during a bilateral meeting in 2022.

- In February 1963, the King of Greece Paul and the Queen Friderica paid an official visit to India.
- In March 1982, the president of the Hellenic Republic, Konstantinos Karamanlis, paid an official visit to India.
- In September 1983, the prime minister of India Indira Gandhi visited Athens and Delphi.
- In December 2000, Greek foreign minister George Papandreou visited India.
- In February 2001, Prime Minister of Greece Kostas Simitis visited India.
- In July 2004, the Indian minister of Youth Affairs and Sports Sunil Dutt visited Greece on the occasion of the Athens 2004 Olympic Games.
- In September 2006, Speaker of the Lok Sabha Somnath Chatterjee visited Greece.
- In February 2007, Greek finance minister Georgios Alogoskoufis Visited India
- In April 2007, President of India Avul Pakir Jainulabdeen Abdul Kalam made an official visit to Athens.
- In January 2008, Prime Minister Kostas Karamanlis visited India
- In December 2015, Greek defence minister Panos Kammenos visited India
- In April 2018, India's state minister of agriculture Shri Gajendra Singh Shekhawat visited Greece
- In June 2018, President of India Ram Nath Kovind made an official visit to Athens.
- In September 2019, India's minister of commerce and industry Hardeep Singh Puri visited Greece and Inaugurated the Indian Pavilion in Thessaloniki International Fair
- In June 2021, India's minister of external affairs S. Jaishankar visited Greece
- In March 2022, Greek foreign minister Nikos Dendias visited India
- In January 2023, India's minister of state for external affairs and culture Meenakashi Lekhi visited Greece
- On August 25, 2023, India's prime minister Narendra Modi visited Greece.
- In November 2023, Greece's minister of rural development and food, Eleftherios Avgenakis visited India
- In February 2024, Greece's prime minister Kyriakos Mitsotakis visited India.
- In February 2025, Greece's Foreign Minister George Gerapetritis visited India.
- In February 2026, Greece's Minister of Tourism, Olga Kefalogianni, visited New Delhi.

== List of bilateral treaties ==
- Agreement on Cultural Exchange, 1961
- Agreement on Avoidance of Double Taxation, 1967
- Agreement for Joint Commission for Economic, Scientific and Technical Cooperation, 1983.
- Joint Business Council of FICCI and ASSOCHAM and the Athens Chamber of Commerce, 1996.
- Agreement of Co-operation between Hellenic Foreign Trade Board and India *Trade Promotion Organisation, 1996.
- Agreement on Tourism Cooperation, 1998.
- MoU on Defence Cooperation, 1998.
- MoU for Cooperation in Agriculture, 2001.
- Agreement on Promotion and Reciprocal Protection of Investments (BIPA), 2007.
- Agreement on Co-operation in Science & Technology, 2007.
- MOU between CII and Federation of Greek Industries, 2007.
- MOU for Co-operation between Institute of Science, Bengaluru and *National Technical University of Athens (NTUA), 2007.

== Resident diplomatic missions ==
- Greece has an embassy in New Delhi.
- India has an embassy in Athens.

== See also ==
- Foreign relations of Greece
- Foreign relations of India
- Greeks in India
- Indians in Greece
- Greek Cemetery, Kolkata
