= Manhai pillar capital =

Ancient column capital in Manhai

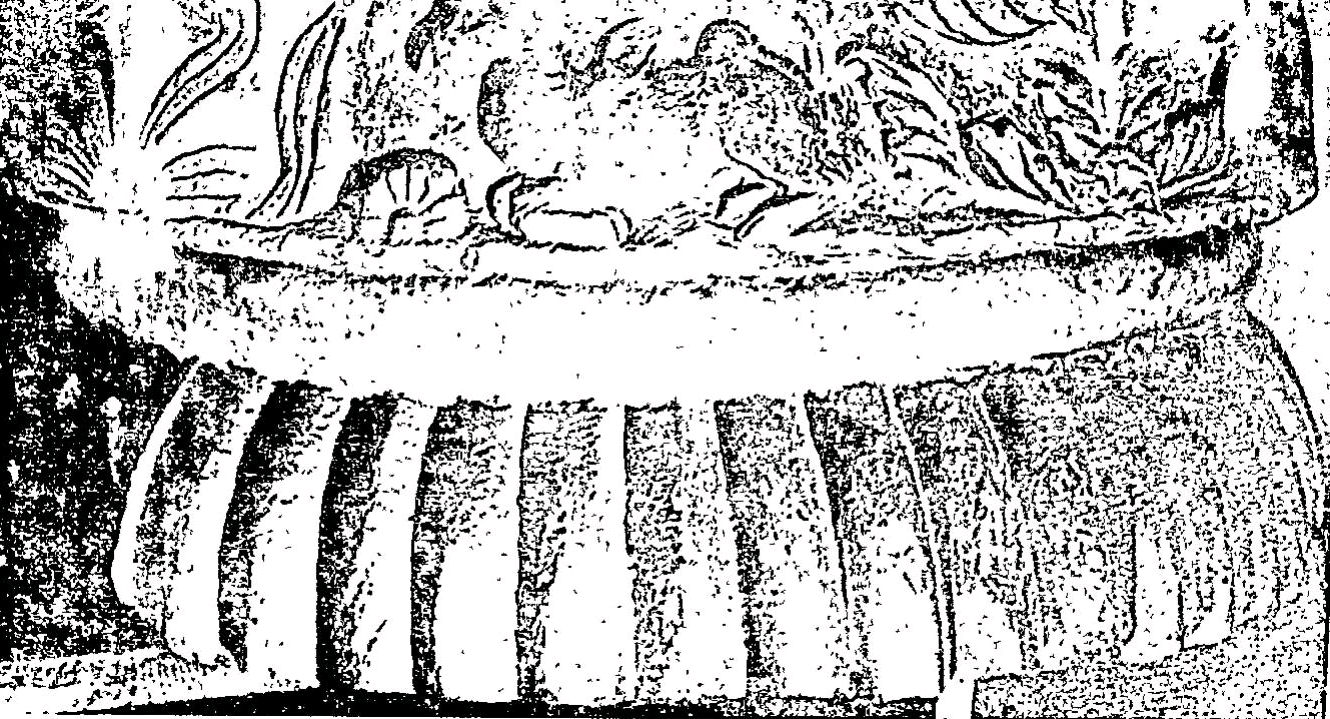
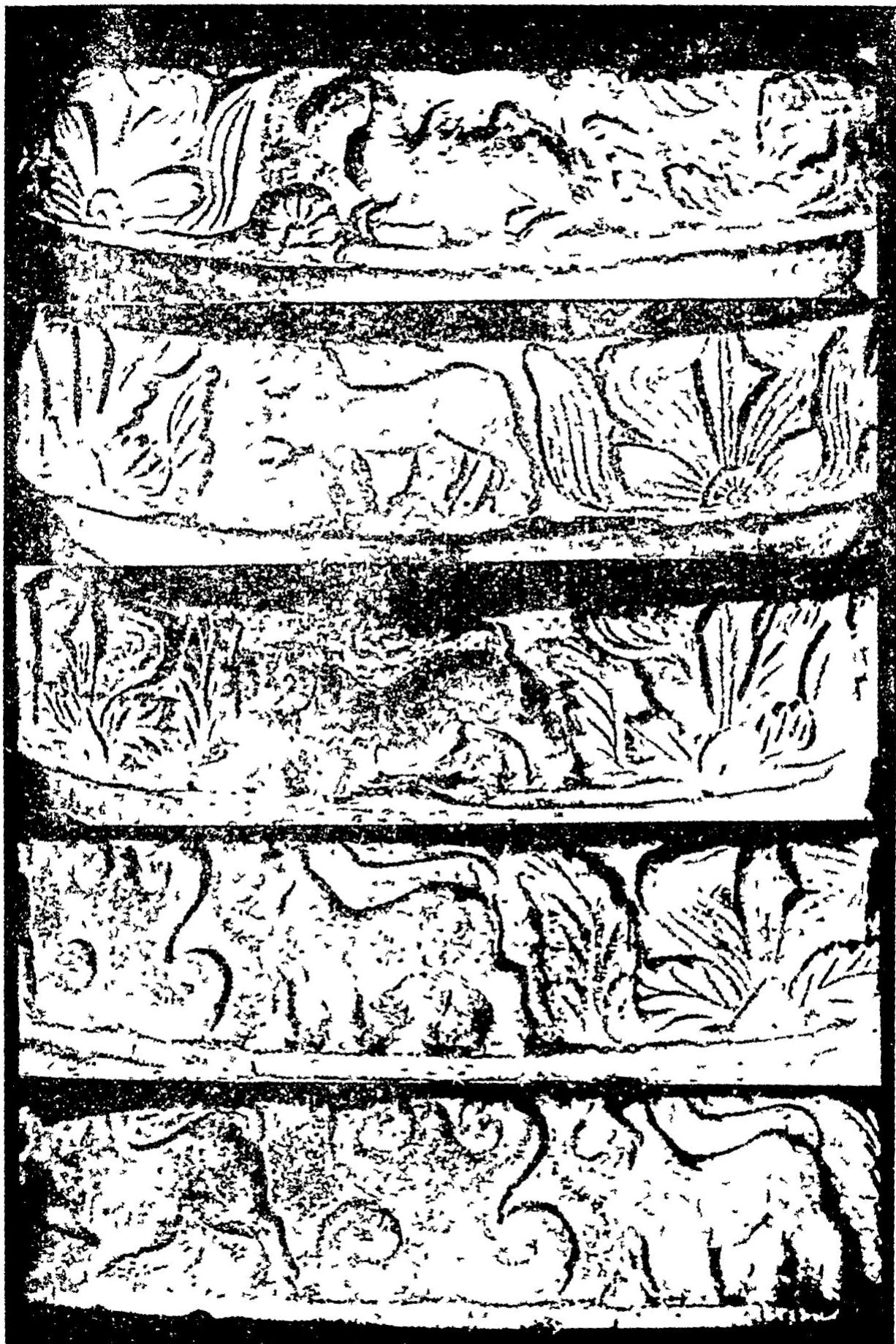
- Reproduction of the Manhai pillar capital (Top: capital base. Bottom: designs of the abacus.
- Period/culture: 2rd Century BCE
- Place: Manhai, Kausambi, Uttar Pradesh, India
- Present location: Museum of the Centre of Advanced Study, Department of Ancient History, Culture and Archaeology, University of Allahabad.

Location
- Location of the Manhai pillar capital.

The Manhai pillar capital is the portion of an ancient capital found in the city of Manhai (also spelled Mainhai), one and half miles to the east of the eastern gateway of Kausambi, Uttar Pradesh in India, and published in 1980 in "Reh Inscription of Menander And The Indo-greek Invasion Of The Ganga Valley" by G. R. Sharma. The fragmentary stone-slab is displayed in the Museum of the Centre of Advanced Study, Department of Ancient History, Culture and Archaeology, University of Allahabad.

== Analysis ==
=== Hellenistic style ===
According to Allahabad University historian G. R. Sharma, the Manhai pillar capital displays realistic depictions of animals and architectural styles, particularly floral designs, which are characteristic of Hellenistic art. He suggests that the capital can only have been made by a Greek artist, working for the Indo-Greek ruler Menander I, whose campaigns brought him to central and eastern India. Shamal suggests that the Manhai pillar capital is one additional element proving the presence of Menander in Kausambi circa 160 BCE.

=== Double-humped camel of Menander ===
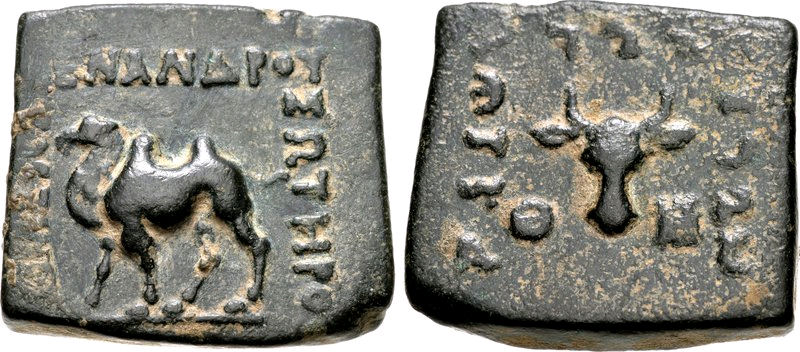
Coin of Menander I coin with double-humped camel, a unique occurrence in Indo-Greek coinage.

The motifs in the abacus incorporate numerous animal, several depictions of lions, a horse, and in particular a double-humped camel, which, Sharma says, is probably characteristic of Menander I, who is also known to have used camels on his coins.

== Architecture at the perimeter ==
The walls in the area where the capital was found are also said to have been the work of Greek craftsmen, due to their construction consisting of large blocks joined with iron clamps and nails, a mode of construction unknown at the time in the Ganges valley. A double-tanged arrowhead of Greek design was also found in conjunction with the fortifications.

== See also ==
- Architecture of India
- Indo-Greeks

== Sources ==
- Reh Inscription of Menander and the Indo Greek Invasion of the Ganga Valley, (Studies in history, culture and archaeology / University of Allahabad, Dept. of Ancient History, Culture and Archaeology) Abinash Prakashan (1980)
