= Reh Inscription =

Ancient fragmentary Prakrit inscription

Reh inscription
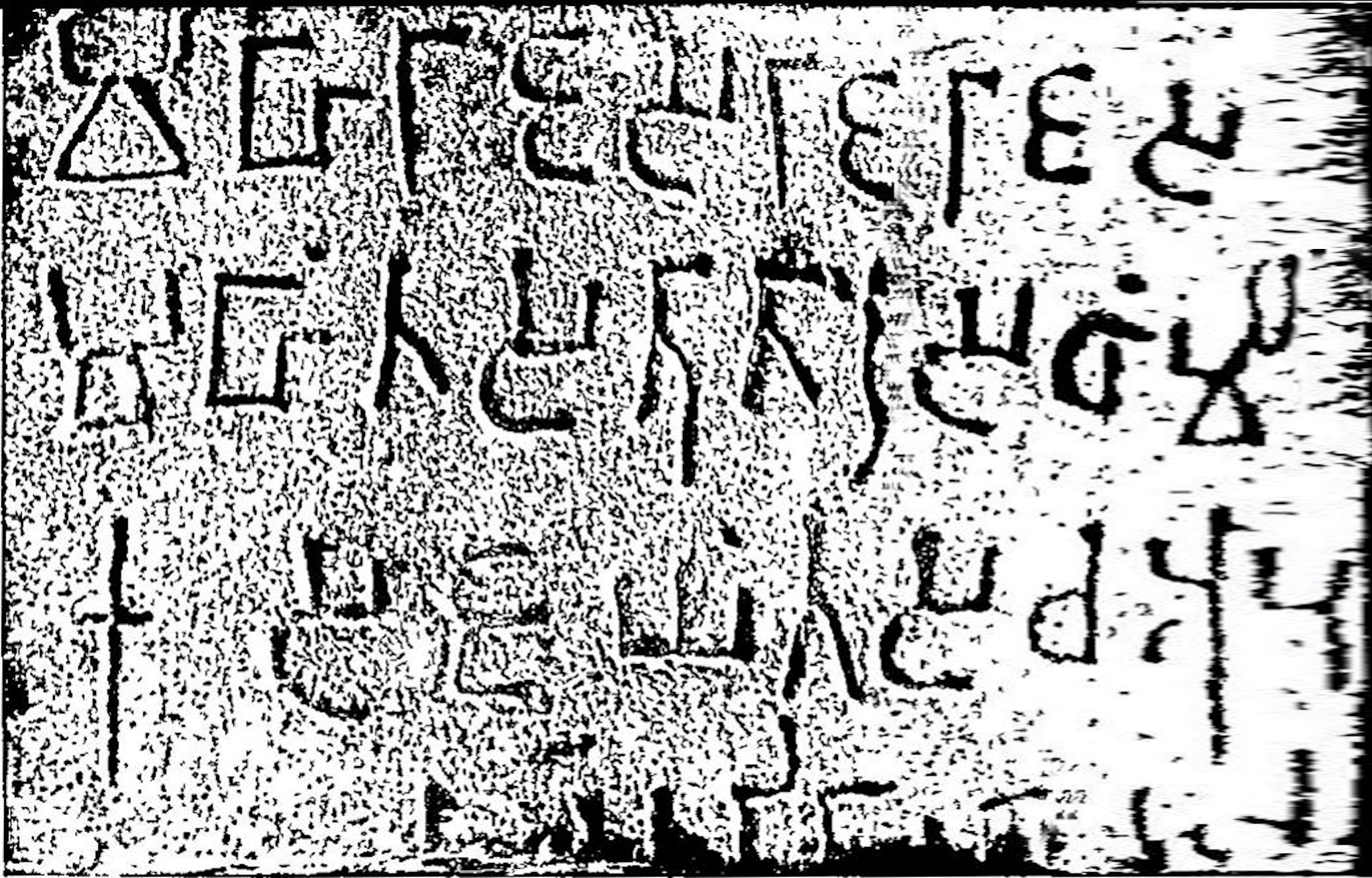
- The Brahmi script Reh inscription
- Writing: Prakrita, Brahmi script
- Created: 2nd Century BCE - 2nd century CE
- Place: Reh, Fatehpur district, India
- Present location: Reh, Fatehpur district, India

Location
- Location of the Reh Linga with inscription

The Reh Inscription was discovered in 1979 near the Reh archaeological site along Yamuna River about 350 kilometres (220 mi) east of Mathura in India. It is a Prakrit inscription in Brahmi script near the bottom of a Shiva linga. The inscription is dated to between the 2nd century BCE and 2nd century CE based on the script style.

The fragmentary inscription was published by the historian G. R. Sharma in 1980, who proposed that it mentions the Indo-Greek king Menander I. This theory has been discredited by other scholars such as B.N. Mukherjee and Richard Salomon, though the Reh inscription is acknowledged as an important new discovery. The Reh inscription is significant in establishing the existence of aniconic representation of Shiva and Shaivism ideas in ancient north India.

== Location ==
The Reh inscription is found on a Shiva linga pillar in a Hindu temple. It was discovered by an Indian research student of Allahabad University named D.P. Sharma who was visiting Reh, Fatehpur district, Uttar Pradesh, in the Ganges valley. The site is about 96 kilometres (60 mi) west of Kausambi and 350 kilometres (220 mi) south-east of Mathura, on the left bank of the Yamuna river.

== Inscription ==
The fragmentary Brahmi script inscription is on the bottom of a polished Shiva linga shaft made from sandstone that was at some point cut out from its original location. Three of its lines are well preserved, the fourth is at the edge of where the linga was cut off and is damaged. Other lines if any below the fourth line are lost. The Shiva linga, at the time of the inscriptions discovery, was consecrated in Hindu temple's sanctum. This, states Bivar, suggests that the local Hindus may have unearthed the Shiva linga with its inscription quite some time ago. The cascade of interest and the antiquity of the Shiva linga led the temple authorities to formally embed and consecrate the linga in its sanctum. The inscription is no longer viewable. Only photographs taken at the time of its discovery are the current source of scholarship on Reh inscription.

The Shiva linga on which the Reh inscription is found is referred in scholarly literature as the "Reh Linga". It is in three parts, states Doris Srinivasan, with a dome of 68 centimetres (27 in), shaft of 77 centimetres (30 in) and rest being the base that was presumably part of the foundation where the linga was installed. (Note: Sharma estimated that the total length of the linga before it was broken may have been about 251 centimetres (99 in).)

=== Dating ===
G.R. Sharma proposed that the Reh inscription is from the 2nd-century BCE and is related to the Indo-Greek king Menander, which if true would make the linga the oldest known Shaivism artifact as well as support Sharma's theory that Greek heritage king and his army "invaded Ganges valley and were responsible for widespread devastation and pillaging of ancient India", a "holocast" [sic], destruction of Buddhist sites and historic change in India's economic, social and religious landscape. Later scholars do not agree with this dating or Sharma's interpretation. According to other scholars, Sharma's identification with Menander is based on interpolation and in flawed synthesis. Setting aside Sharma's interpretation and analysis, the epigraphical evidence confirms that the Reh Linga and inscription was created sometime between the 2nd century BCE and 2nd century CE. Doris Srinivasan states that the evidence suggests this can be further narrowed down to 1st-century BCE and 1st century CE.

=== Text ===
The inscription reads:

mahārājasa rājarājasa
mahāṁtasa trātārasa dhāṁmī
kasa Jayaṁtasa ca Apra

– Reh Inscription, 1st-century BCE to 1st-century CE

=== Sharma's inscription extrapolation and proposal ===
Sharma has extrapolated the badly damaged fourth line of the inscription, to suggest that the Reh inscription may originally have been:

mahārājasa rājarājasa
mahāṁtasa trātārasa dhāṁmī
kasa Jayaṁtasa ca Apra
[jitasa] Minānada[de?]rasa....

– Extrapolated Reh Inscription

Reh inscription (Extrapolation by Sharma)
Translation
(English)

Of the king of kings,

Great Savior, Just,

Victorious, and Invincible,

[Menander].

Transliteration
(original Brahmi script)

𑀫𑀳𑀸𑀭𑀸𑀚𑀲 𑀭𑀸𑀚𑀭𑀸𑀚𑀲
mahārājasa rājarājasa
𑀫𑀳𑀸𑀁𑀢𑀲 𑀢𑀸𑀾𑀢𑀸𑀭𑀲 𑀥𑀸𑀁𑀫𑀻
mahāṁtasa trātārasa dhāṁmī
𑀓𑀲 𑀚𑀬𑀁𑀢𑀲 𑀘 𑀅𑀧𑁆𑀭
kasa Jayaṁtasa ca Apra
(𑀚𑀺𑀢𑀲) 𑀫𑀺𑀦𑀸𑀦𑀤(𑀤𑁂)𑀭𑀲
[jitasa] Minānada[de?]rasa

Inscription
(Prakrit in the Brahmi script)

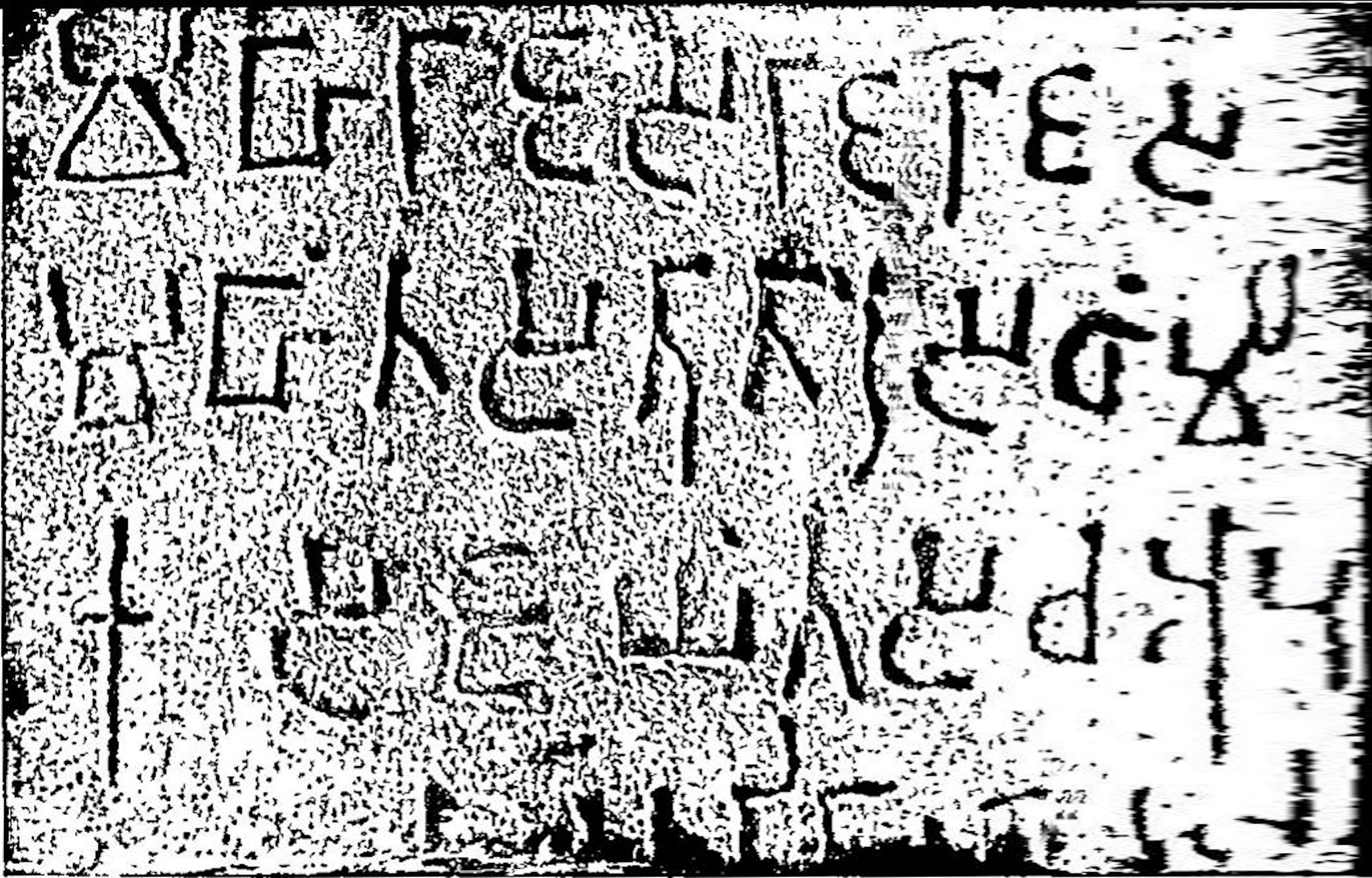
Reh inscription

=== Translation ===
Assuming Sharma's reading of "Menander" is correct, states Frank Holt, the Brahmi script inscription translates to

Of the king of kings, Great Savior, Just, Victorious, and Invincible, [Menander]

Holt states that Sharma's reading of Menander's name is questionable. Bivar agrees.

=== Sharma's analysis ===
According to G.R. Sharma, the inscription is an exact and word-for-word translation of a Greek title:

"BASILEOS BASILEON
MEGALOU SOTEROS
DIKAIOU NIKETOROU KAI ANIKETOU

MENANDROU"

Sharma thereafter combines his interpretation and synthesis into a book that reconstructs the history of Yamuna region and Menander. He cites "invasion layers", "conflagration layers" and "double tanged arrows" to present the theory that the Greeks led by Menander devastated the region. Bivar, in his review of "Reh inscription"-triggered Sharma's book, states that the book's thesis is "[Menander] caused merciless burning of towns, complete destruction of buildings, the consequent exodus of the surviving, wanton slaughter of men, women and children, plundering of towns and villages, destruction of industry, (...)."

=== Counterproposals and revised analysis ===
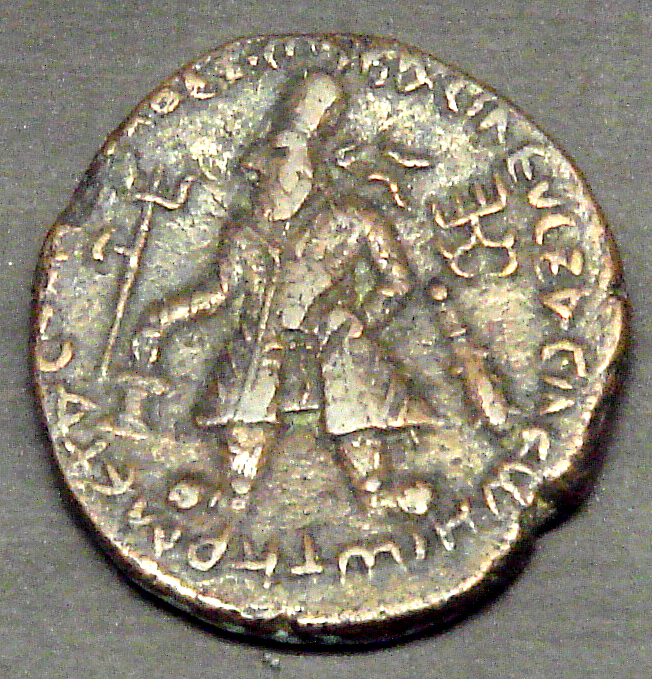
A coin of Vima Kadphises with legend in corrupt Greek script: ΒΑϹΙΛΕΥϹ BACIΛEWN CWTHP MEΓAC ΟΟΗΜΟ ΚΑΔΦΙϹΗϹ ("Basileus Basileuon Soter Megas Ooemo Kadphises"): "King of Kings Vima Kadphises the Great Saviour". British Museum.

Other authors however have pointed that the reading of Menander is questionable and that Sharma did not provide any photo, evidence or justification for interpreting the fourth line to be Menander.

According to Parmeshwari Lal Gupta, the Sharma's discovery is important but his analysis is flawed on many levels. First, the damaged fourth line does not state "[jitasa] Minānada[de?]rasa...." at all, by "any flight of imagination", and it is Sharma's construction to support his hypothesis of "valiantly wicked Yavanas marching along Mathura to Pataliputra". Second, state Gupta and other scholars, Sharma's argument of the inscription being a Prakrit translation of a phrase found in Greek is interesting, but this phrase was never used by Menander or any Indo-Greek king on any coin or any artifact. Actually the Greco-Bactrians or the Indo-Greeks never used the expression "King of Kings" which was characteristic of Parthian rulers; it was first used in India by an Indo-Scythian ruler named Maues (85–60 BCE). The phrase in the Reh inscription is found only in an inscription found in Kamra in Afghanistan for a Kushana ruler. The earliest king that this inscription can be dated with is Wima Kadphises (90–100 CE) and the inscription on a Shiva linga may have nothing to do with any invasion, massacre or destruction. Bivar, in contrast, states that the elaborate title may be more appropriate and expected from Apollodotus II or Hippostratus.

== Shiva linga ==
The Reh Linga attests to a Shiva-related tradition in north India. The stone linga is polished and similar to the two plain lingas found in Mathura archaeological site, one at the Kankali Tila site and the other from Bhutesvara. Both are dated to the 1st-century BCE. Given the distance of 350 kilometres (220 mi) between Mathura and Reh, the discovery suggests that the Shaiva influence was pan-Ganges valley. The Reh linga adds to the extensive Brahmanical imagery that has been discovered and attributed to the ancient Mathura school.
