= G. R. Sharma =

Indian archaeologist

Govardhan Rai Sharma (1919–1986) was a Historian from Allahabad University who led the Kausambi excavations which added to original historical research in the country. The ruins of this ancient city were found on the left bank of the river Yamuna, 70 km south-west from Allahabad. Thus commenced excavations of the site by the late Prof. G.R. Sharma of the Allahabad University in 1949 and again in 1951–1956. Following these excavations numerous remains of the ancient city came to light. His findings and claims have been contested by other scholars. He is among the historians who brought archeology in the mainstream of studying History.

Professor G.R. Sharma, had ventured to document archaeologically the destruction and burning of several settlements in the Ganges valley during the so-called invasion of the Indo-Greek king Menander (considered to be identical with Milinda of the Buddhist tradition) in the 2nd century BC.

Professor G.R.Sharma had also discovered (in 1967) a prehistoric site near Khajuri on the river Belan, a tributary of the river Tons, in the Meja sub-division of Allahabad district of Uttar Pradesh.

== Works ==
- The excavations at Kausambi (1957–59): The defences and the Syenaciti of the Purusamedha, Dept. of Ancient History, Culture & Archaeology, University of Allahabad (1960)
- Excavations at Kausambi, 1949–50, (Memoirs of the Archaeological Survey of India), Manager of Publications (1969)
- Kusana Studies – Papers Presented to the International Conference on the Archaeology, History and Arts of the People of Central Asia in the Kusana Period – Dushambe (Tadjikistan) U.S.S.R. September 25 – October 4, 1968, University of Allahabad (1968)
- Beginnings of Agriculture: from Hunting and Food Gathering to Domestication of Plants and Animals : Epi-Palaeolithic to Neolithic : Excavations at Chopani-Mando, Mahadaha, and Mahagara, Abinash (1980)
- Excavations at Chopani-Mando, Belan Valley, 1977-79: Epipalaeolithic to protoneolothic (Archaeology of the Vindhyas and the Ganga Valley), Dept. of Ancient History, Culture and Archaeology, University of Allahabad (1980)
- Excavations at Mahadaha, 1977-1978: A mesolithic settlement in the Ganga Valley (Archaeology of the Vindhyas and the Ganga Valley), Dept. of Ancient History, Culture and Archaeology, University of Allahabad (1980)
- Excavations at Mahagara, 1977-1978: A neolithic settlement in the Belan Valley (Archaeology of the Vindhyas and the Ganga Valley), Dept. of Ancient History, Culture and Archaeology, University of Allahabad (1980)
- Reh Inscription of Menander and the Indo Greek Invasion of the Ganga Valley, (Studies in history, culture and archaeology / University of Allahabad, Dept. of Ancient History, Culture and Archaeology) Abinash Prakashan (1980)

== Edited works ==
- Clark, J.D. and Sharma, G.R. (Eds.) Palaeoenvironment and Prehistory in the Middle Son Valley, Madhya Pradesh, north central India. Allahabad: Abinash Prakashan.
- Clark, J.D. with J.M. Kenoyer, J.N. Pal and G.R. Sharma. An Upper Palaeolithic shrine in India? Antiquity, 57: 88-94.
- Clark, J.D. with J.M. Kenoyer, J.N. Pal and G.R. Sharma. Baghor I: A possible Upper Palaeolithic shrine in central India. Anthroquest, 25: 1, 11-14.
- History to Prehistory : Archaeology of the Ganga Valley and the Vindhyas, General Editor: G.R. Sharma, Editorial Board: J.D. Clark & B.K. Thapar, Managing Editor: D. Mandal, Allahabad, University of Allahabad, Department of Ancient History, Culture, and Archaeology, 1980.
