= Dimitrios Galanos =

Greek Indologist (1760-1833)

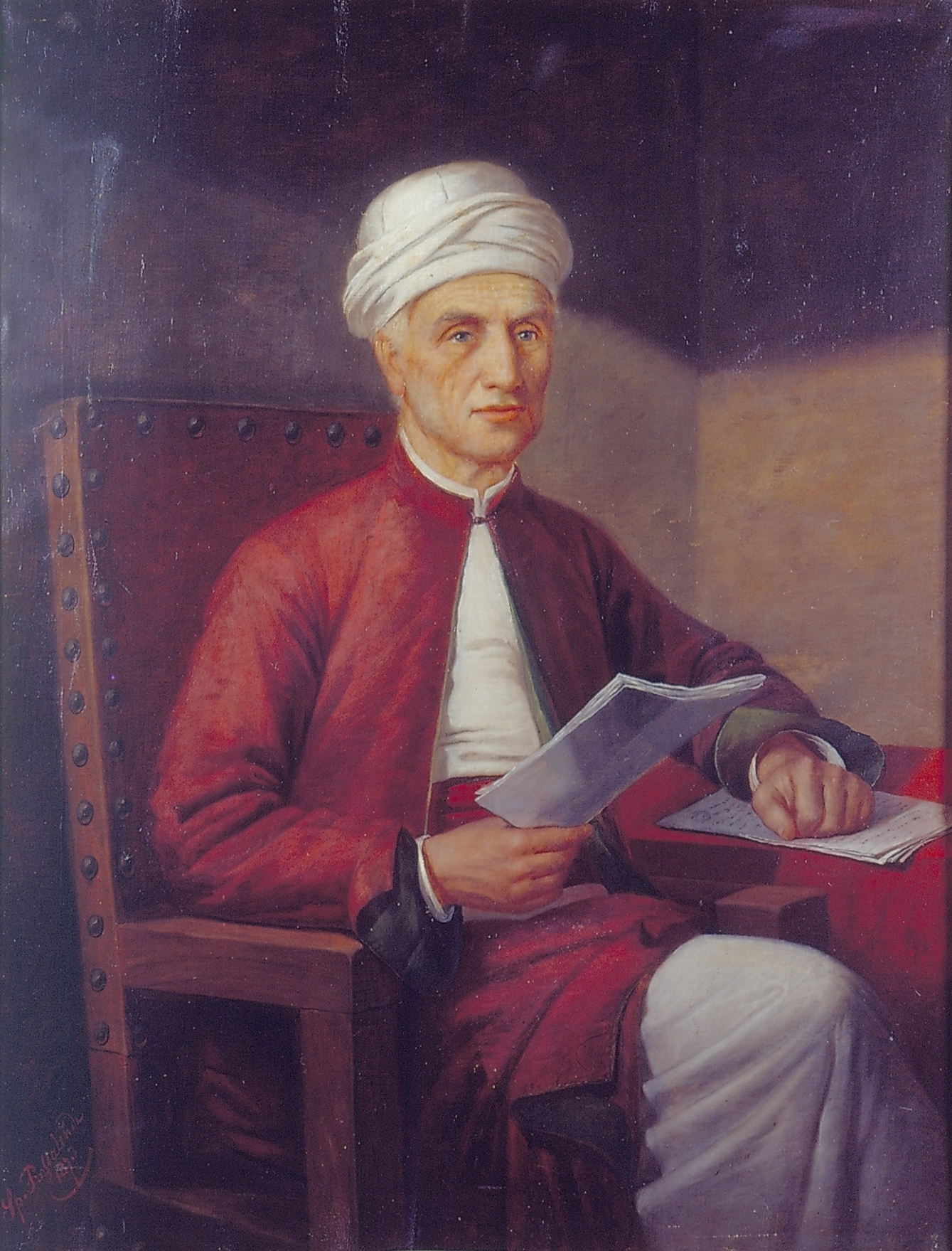
Portrait of Dimitrios Galanos by Spyridon Prosalentis. The original now resides in the gallery of the University of Athens

Dimitrios Galanos or Demetrios Galanos (Greek: Δημήτριος Γαλανός; 1760–1833) was the earliest recorded Greek Indologist. His translations of Sanskrit texts into Greek made knowledge of the philosophical and religious ideas of India available to many Europeans.

Born in Athens, Ottoman Empire (present-day Greece) in 1760, he spent 47 years in India, where he translated many Hindu sacred texts into Greek and compiled a Sanskrit-English-Greek dictionary of over 9000 words. He died on 3 May 1833 in Varanasi, India. He was buried in the Catholic cemetery there, and his tombstone is inscribed with the epitaph, "ΕΙΣ ΜΝΗΜΗΝ ΔΗΜΗΤΡΙΟΥ ΓΑΛΑΝΟΥ ΤΟΥ ΑΘΗΝΑΙΟΥ" ('in memory of Dimitrios Galanos the Athenian'). Munshi Sital Singh (a "wise Brahman" who was a friend and teacher of Galanos) wrote these verses in Hindustani, which he affixed above the tomb: "Woe, a hundred times! Dimitrios Galanos departed from this world to the eternal monads. Woe me! Weeping and wailing have I said it. I am out of myself. Ah, he has gone away, the Plato of this century) (Schulz 1969, p. 354). Preceded by a short remembrance in Persian, the following Greek dirge was also added by Ananias, curate to the Patriarch of Sinai: "Demetrios Galanos, the Athenian from Greece, died in the Indies. He was a friend of the Muses and a man of learning. He shone brightly in fame and vocation. He left this wearisome life and departed for a life without affiction and eternal. Out of gratitude, his nephew Pandoleon erects this cenotaph for his eternal memory" (Schulz 1969, p. 355).

Galanos lived at Calcutta for 6 years. There he was teaching Greek language to the Greek community. Then, at 1793 he went to Varanasi and he started to translate ancient Indian scripts to Greek till his death.

A "Dimitrios Galanos" Chair for Hellenic Studies was established at Jawaharlal Nehru University in New Delhi, India in September 2000.

An International Conference titled "Demetrios Galanos and His Legacy: Indo-Greek scholarship 1790-2018" was organized by the Indira Gandhi National Centre for the Arts (IGNCA) and was held in two phases, one – in New Delhi and the other – in Varanasi, in February, 2018.

== Books by Demetrios Galanos ==
- Demetrios Galanos’ books edited by Georgios K.Typaldos are freely accessible in PDF format at the Greek-Indian Digital Library
- Demetrios Galanos' Correspondence with Father Gregorios published in "Indiki Allilografia" by Ilias Tandalidis is freely accessible in PDF format at the Greek-Indian Digital Library
- Galanos, Demetrios. LEXICON Sanskrit-English-Greek. Konidaris Publications, Athens. (2010) ISBN 978-960-392-123-3
