= Indus Valley Civilisation =

Bronze Age civilisation in South Asia

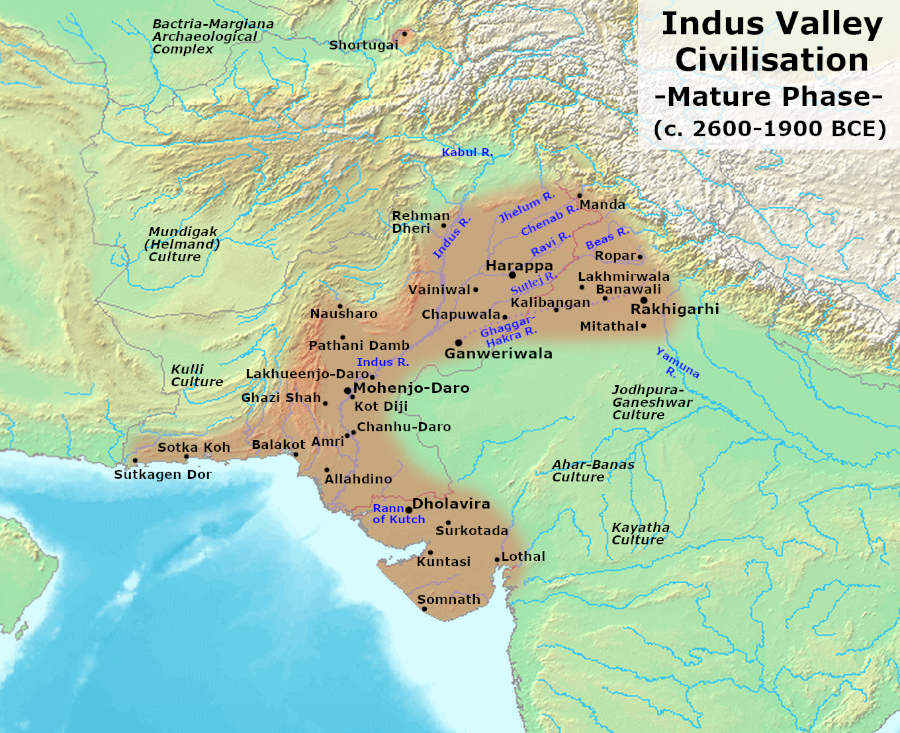
- Alternative names: Harappan Civilisation; Indus Civilisation
- Geographical range: Basins of the Indus and Ghaggar-Hakra Rivers
- Period: Bronze Age in South Asia
- Dates: c. 3300 – c. 1300 BCE
- Type site: Harappa
- Major sites: Harappa, Mohenjo-daro, Ganweriwala, Dholavira, and Rakhigarhi
- Preceded by: Mehrgarh
- Followed by: Cemetery H culture Black and red ware Ochre Coloured Pottery culture Painted Grey Ware culture

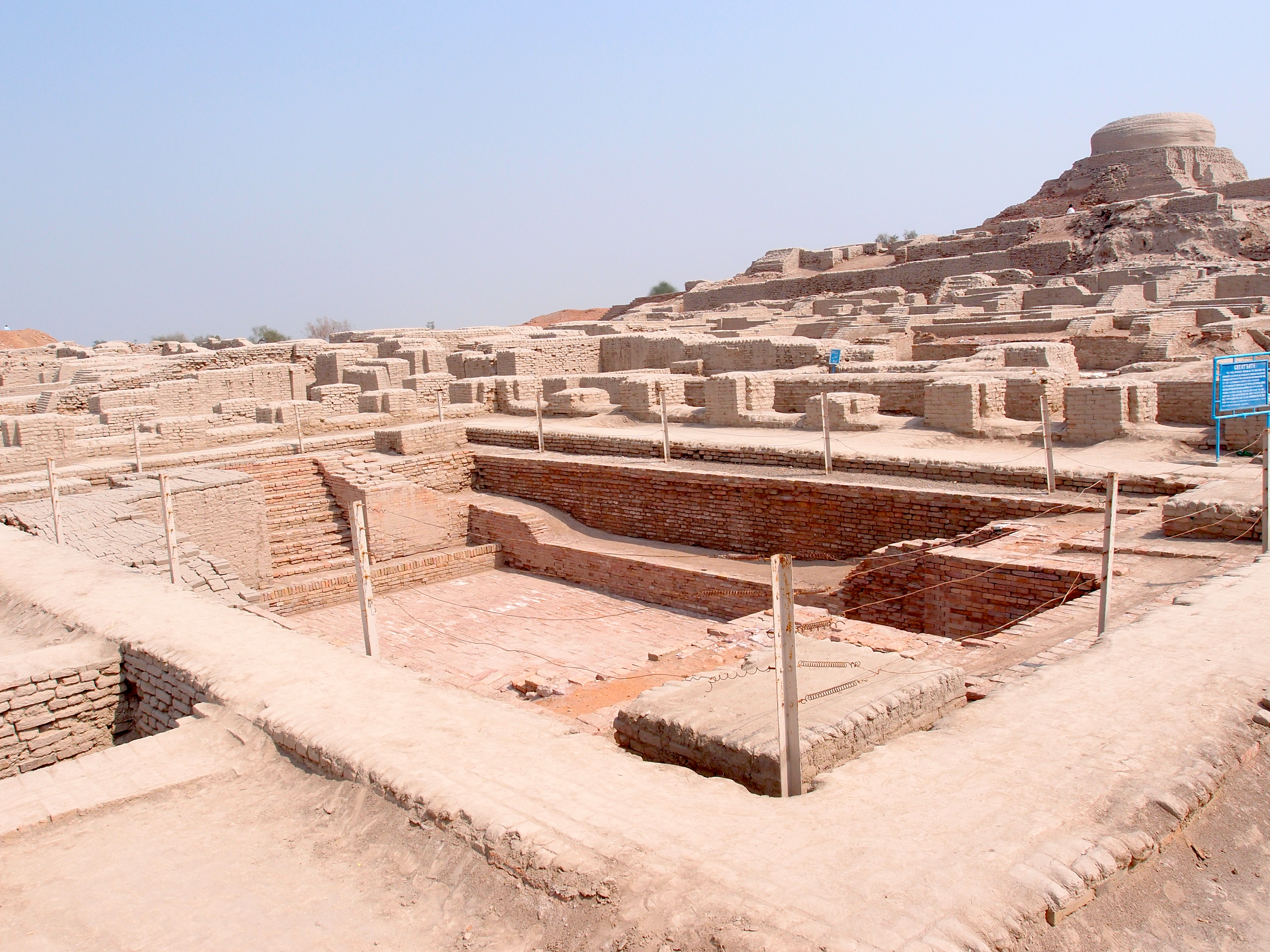
Ruins of Mohenjo-daro on the Indus River in Pakistan, the first South Asian UNESCO World Heritage Site; the Great Bath is in the foreground.

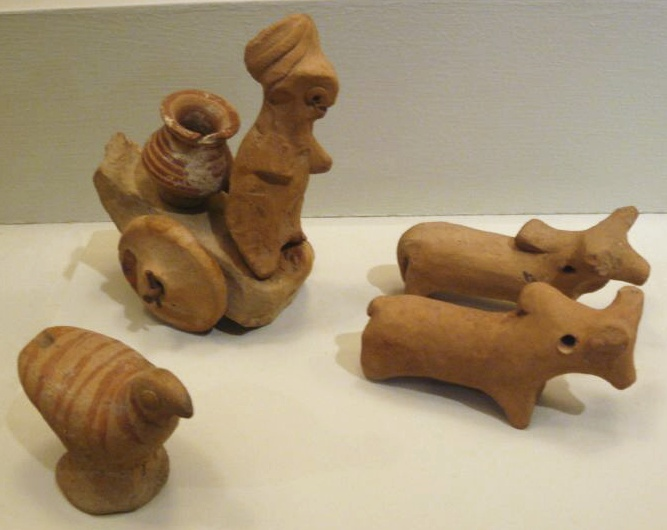
Miniature votive images or toys from Harappa, c. 2500 BCE, clay figurines of zebu oxen, a cart, and a chicken.

The Indus Valley Civilisation (IVC), also known as the Indus Civilisation was a Bronze Age civilisation in the northwestern regions of South Asia, lasting from 3300 BCE to 1300 BCE, and in its mature form from 2600 BCE to 1900 BCE. (Note: Wright: "Mesopotamia and Egypt ... co-existed with the Indus civilization during its florescence between 2600 and 1900 BC.") Together with ancient Egypt and Mesopotamia, it was one of the three early civilisations of the Near East and South Asia; of the three, it was the most widespread: it spanned much of Pakistan, northwestern India, and northeast Afghanistan. (Note: Wright: "The Indus civilisation is one of three in the 'Ancient East' that, along with Mesopotamia and Pharaonic Egypt, was a cradle of early civilisation in the Old World (Childe, 1950). Mesopotamia and Egypt were longer-lived, but coexisted with Indus civilisation during its florescence between 2600 and 1900 B.C. Of the three, the Indus was the most expansive, extending from today's northeast Afghanistan to Pakistan and India.") The civilisation flourished in the alluvial plain of the Indus River and along a system of perennial monsoon-fed rivers that once coursed in the vicinity of the Ghaggar-Hakra, a seasonal river in northwest India and eastern Pakistan.

The term Harappan is also applied to the Indus Civilisation, after its type site Harappa, the first to be excavated early in the 20th century in what was then the Punjab province of British India and is now Punjab, Pakistan. (Note: Habib: "Harappa, in Sahiwal district of west Punjab, Pakistan, had long been known to archaeologists as an extensive site on the Ravi river, but its true significance as a major city of an early great civilisation remained unrecognised until the discovery of Mohenjo-daro near the banks of the Indus, in the Larkana district of Sindh, by Rakhaldas Banerji in 1922. Sir John Marshall, then Director General of the Archaeological Survey of India, used the term 'Indus civilization' for the culture discovered at Harappa and Mohenjo-daro, a term doubly apt because of the geographical context implied in the name 'Indus' and the presence of cities implied in the word 'civilization'. Others, notably the Archaeological Survey of India after Independence, have preferred to call it 'Harappan', or 'Mature Harappan', taking Harappa to be its type-site.") The discovery of Harappa and soon afterwards Mohenjo-daro was the culmination of work that had begun after the founding of the Archaeological Survey of India in the British Raj in 1861. There were earlier and later cultures called Early Harappan and Late Harappan in the same area. The early Harappan cultures were populated from Neolithic cultures, the earliest and best-known of which is named after Mehrgarh, in Balochistan, Pakistan. Harappan civilisation is sometimes called Mature Harappan to distinguish it from the earlier cultures.

The cities of the ancient Indus were noted for their urban planning, baked brick houses, elaborate drainage systems, water supply systems, clusters of large non-residential buildings, and techniques of handicraft and metallurgy. (Note: These covered carnelian products, seal carving, work in copper, bronze, lead, and tin.) Mohenjo-daro and Harappa very likely grew to contain between 30,000 and 60,000 individuals, and the civilisation may have contained between one and five million individuals during its florescence. A gradual drying of the region during the 3rd millennium BCE may have been the initial stimulus for its urbanisation. Eventually it also reduced the water supply enough to cause the civilisation's demise and to disperse its population to the east. (Note: Brooke (2014), p. 296. "The story in Harappan India was somewhat different (see Figure 111.3). The Bronze Age village and urban societies of the Indus Valley are something of an anomaly, in that archaeologists have found little indication of local defense and regional warfare. It would seem that the bountiful monsoon rainfall of the Early to Mid-Holocene had forged a condition of plenty for all and that competitive energies were channeled into commerce rather than conflict. Scholars have long argued that these rains shaped the origins of the urban Harappan societies, which emerged from Neolithic villages around 2600 BC. It now appears that this rainfall began to slowly taper off in the third millennium, at just the point that the Harappan cities began to develop. Thus it seems that this "first urbanisation" in South Asia was the initial response of the Indus Valley peoples to the beginning of Late Holocene aridification. These cities were maintained for 300 to 400 years and then gradually abandoned as the Harappan peoples resettled in scattered villages in the eastern range of their territories, into Punjab and the Ganges Valley....' 17 (footnote): (a) Giosan et al. (2012); (b) Ponton et al. (2012); (c) Rashid et al. (2011); (d) Madella & Fuller (2006); Compare with the very different interpretations in (e) Possehl (2002), pp. 237–245 (f) Staubwasser et al. (2003))

Although over a thousand Mature Harappan sites have been reported and nearly a hundred excavated, (Note: Reported sites: Possehl 2002, p. 20; Possehl 2002a: "There are 1,056 Mature Harappan sites that have been reported of which 96 have been excavated."; Singh, Upinder 2008, p. 137: "Today, the count of Harappan sites has risen to about 1,022, of which 406 are in Pakistan and 616 in India. Of these, only 97 have so far been excavated."; Coningham & Young 2015, p. 192: "More than 1,000 settlements belonging to the Integrated Era have been identified (Singh, 2008: 137)") there are only five major urban centres: (Note: Coningham and Young: "More than 1,000 settlements belonging to the Integrated Era have been identifie d (Singh, 2008: 137), but there are only five significant urban sites at the peak of the settlement hierarchy (Smith, 2.006a: 110) (Figure 6.2).These are: Mohenjo-daro in the lower Indus plain; Harappa in the western Punjab; Ganweriwala in Cholistan; Dholavira in western Gujarat; and Rakhigarhi in Haryana. Mohenjo-daro covered an area of more than 250 hectares, Harappa exceeded 150 hectares, Dholavira 100 hectares and Ganweriwala and Rakhigarhi around 80 hectares each.") Mohenjo-daro in the lower Indus Valley (declared a UNESCO World Heritage Site in 1980 as "Archaeological Ruins at Moenjodaro"), Harappa in the western Punjab region, Ganeriwala in the Cholistan Desert, Dholavira in western Gujarat (declared a UNESCO World Heritage Site in 2021 as "Dholavira: A Harappan City"), and Rakhigarhi in Haryana. (Note: Wright: "Five major Indus cities are discussed in this chapter. During the Urban period, the early town of Harappa expanded in size and population and became a major centre in the Upper Indus. Other cities emerging during the Urban period include Mohenjo-daro in the Lower Indus, Dholavira to the south on the western edge of peninsular India in Kutch, Ganweriwala in Cholistan, and a fifth city, Rakhigarhi, on the Ghaggar-Hakra. Rakhigarhi will be discussed briefly in view of the limited published material.") The Harappan language is not directly attested, and its affiliations are uncertain, as the Indus script has remained undeciphered. A relationship with the Dravidian or Elamo-Dravidian language family is favoured by a section of scholars.

== Etymology ==
The Indus Valley Civilisation is named after the Indus River system in whose alluvial plains the early sites of the civilisation were identified and excavated. (Note: Wright: "Unable to state the age of the civilization, he went on to observe that the Indus (which he (John Marshall) named after the river system) artifacts differed from any known other civilizations in the region, ...")

Following a tradition in archaeology, the civilisation is sometimes referred to as the Harappan, after its type site, Harappa, the first site to be excavated in the 1920s; this is notably true of usage employed by the Archaeological Survey of India after India's independence in 1947. (Note: Habib: "Sir John Marshall, then Director General of the Archaeological Survey of India, used the term 'Indus civilization' for the culture discovered at Harappa and Mohenjo-daro, a term doubly apt because of the geographical context implied in the name 'Indus' and the presence of cities implied in the word 'civilization'. Others, notably the Archaeological Survey of India after Independence, have preferred to call it 'Harappan', or 'Mature Harappan', taking Harappa to be its type-site.")

The term "Ghaggar-Hakra" figures prominently in modern labels applied to the Indus civilisation on account of a good number of sites having been found along the Ghaggar-Hakra River in northwest India and eastern Pakistan. The terms "Indus-Sarasvati Civilisation" and "Sindhu-Saraswati Civilisation" have also been employed in the literature by supporters of Indigenous Aryanism, after a posited identification of the Ghaggar-Hakra with the river Sarasvati described in the early chapters of the Rigveda, a collection of hymns in archaic Sanskrit composed in the second-millennium BCE, which are unrelated to the mature phase of the Indus Valley Civilization.

Recent geophysical research suggests that, unlike the Sarasvati described in the Rigveda as a snow-fed river, the Ghaggar-Hakra was a system of perennial monsoon-fed rivers, which became seasonal around the time the civilisation diminished, approximately 4,000 years ago. (Note: Giosan (2012): "Numerous speculations have advanced the idea that the Ghaggar-Hakra fluvial system, at times identified with the lost mythical river of Sarasvati (e.g., 4, 5, 7, 19), was a large glacier fed Himalayan river. Potential sources for this river include the Yamuna River, the Sutlej River, or both rivers. However, the lack of large-scale incision on the interfluve demonstrates that large, glacier-fed rivers did not flow across the Ghaggar-Hakra region during the Holocene. ... The present Ghaggar-Hakra valley and its tributary rivers are currently dry or have seasonal flows. Yet rivers were undoubtedly active in this region during the Urban Harappan Phase. We recovered sandy fluvial deposits approximately 5,400 y old at Fort Abbas in Pakistan (SI Text), and recent work (33) on the upper Ghaggar-Hakra interfluve in India also documented Holocene channel sands that are approximately 4,300 y old. On the upper interfluve, fine-grained floodplain deposition continued until the end of the Late Harappan Phase, as recent as 2,900 y ago (33) (Fig. 2B). This widespread fluvial redistribution of sediment suggests that reliable monsoon rains were able to sustain perennial rivers earlier during the Holocene and explains why Harappan settlements flourished along the entire Ghaggar-Hakra system without access to a glacier-fed river.")

== Extent ==
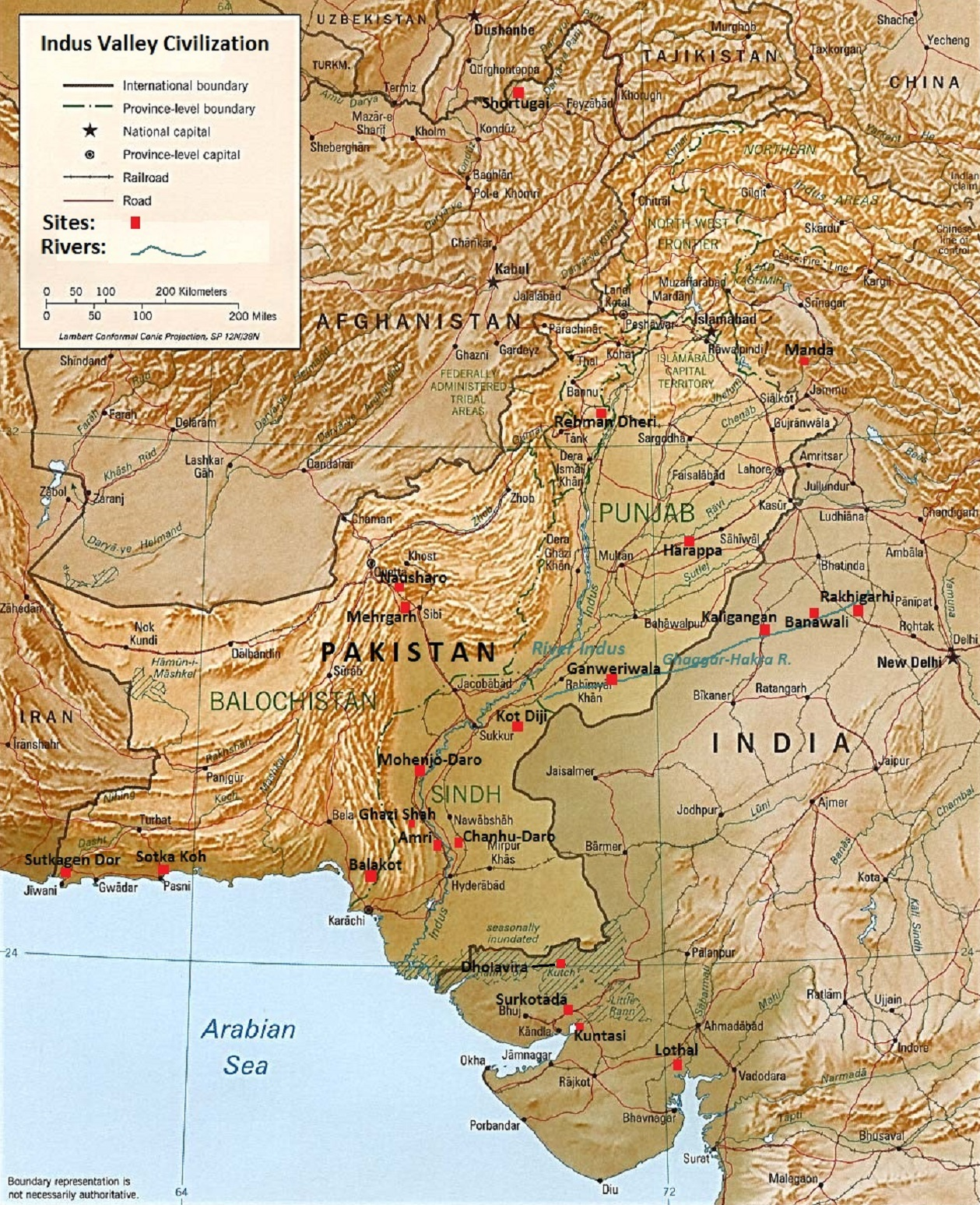
Major sites and extent of the Indus Valley Civilisation

The Indus Valley Civilisation was roughly contemporary with the other riverine civilisations of the ancient world: Ancient Egypt along the Nile, Mesopotamia in the lands watered by the Euphrates and the Tigris, and China in the drainage basin of the Yellow River and the Yangtze. By the time of its mature phase, the civilisation had spread over an area larger than the others, which included a core of 1,500 kilometres (900 mi) up the alluvial plain of the Indus and its tributaries. In addition, there was a region with disparate flora, fauna, and habitats, up to ten times as large, which had been shaped culturally and economically by the Indus. (Note: Fisher: "This was the same broad period that saw the rise of the civilisations of Mesopotamia (between the Tigris and Euphrates Rivers), Egypt (along the Nile), and northeast China (in the Yellow River basin). At its peak, the Indus was the most extensive of these ancient civilisations, extending 1,500 km (900 mi) up the Indus plain, with a core area of 30,000 to 100,000 km^{2} (12,000 to 39,000 sq mi) and with more ecologically diverse peripheral spheres of economic and cultural influence extending out to ten times that area. The cultural and technological uniformity of the Indus cities is especially striking in light of the relatively great distances among them, with separations of about 280 km (170 mi) whereas the Mesopotamian cities, for example, only averaged about 20 to 25 km (12 to 16 mi) apart.)

Around 6500 BCE, agriculture emerged in Balochistan, on the margins of the Indus alluvium. (Note: Dyson: "The subcontinent's people were hunter-gatherers for many millennia. There were very few of them. Indeed, 10,000 years ago there may only have been a couple of hundred thousand people, living in small, often isolated groups, the descendants of various 'modern' human incomers. Then, perhaps linked to events in Mesopotamia, about 8,500 years ago agriculture emerged in Baluchistan.") (Note: Fisher: "The earliest discovered instance in India of well-established, settled agricultural society is at Mehrgarh in the hills between the Bolan Pass and the Indus plain (today in Pakistan) (see Map 3.1). From as early as 7000 BCE, communities there started investing increased labor in preparing the land and selecting, planting, tending, and harvesting particular grain-producing plants. They also domesticated animals, including sheep, goats, pigs, and oxen (both humped zebu [Bos indicus] and unhumped [Bos taurus]). Castrating oxen, for instance, turned them from mainly meat sources into domesticated draft-animals as well.) In the following millennia, settled life made inroads into the Indus plains, setting the stage for the growth of rural and urban settlements. (Note: Coningham and Young: "Mehrgarh remains one of the key sites in South Asia because it has provided the earliest known undisputed evidence for farming and pastoral communities in the region, and its plant and animal material provide clear evidence for the ongoing manipulation, and domestication, of certain species. Perhaps most importantly in a South Asian context, the role played by zebu makes this a distinctive, localised development, with a character completely different to other parts of the world. Finally, the longevity of the site, and its articulation with the neighbouring site of Nausharo (c. 2800–2000 BCE), provides a very clear continuity from South Asia's first farming villages to the emergence of its first cities (Jarrige, 1984).") The more organised sedentary life, in turn, led to a net increase in the birth rate. (Note: Dyson: "In the millennia which followed, farming developed and spread slowly into the Indus valley and adjacent areas. The transition to agriculture led to population growth and the eventual rise of the Indus civilisation. With the movement to settled agriculture, and the emergence of villages, towns and cities, there was probably a modest rise in the average death rate and a slightly greater rise in the birth rate.") The large urban centres of Mohenjo-daro and Harappa very likely grew to containing between 30,000 and 60,000 individuals, and during the civilisation's florescence, the population of the subcontinent grew to between 4–6 million people. (Note: Dyson: "Mohenjo-daro and Harappa may each have contained between 30,000 and 60,000 people (perhaps more in the former case). Water transport was crucial for the provisioning of these and other cities. That said, the vast majority of people lived in rural areas. At the height of the Indus valley civilisation the subcontinent may have contained 4-6 million people.") During this period the death rate increased, as the close living conditions of humans and domesticated animals led to an increase in contagious diseases. (Note: Fisher: "Such an "agricultural revolution" enabled food surpluses that supported growing populations. Their, largely cereal diet did not necessarily make people healthier, however, since conditions like caries and protein deficiencies can increase. Further, infectious diseases spread faster with denser living conditions of both humans and domesticated animals (which can spread measles, influenza, and other diseases to humans).") According to one estimate, the population of the Indus civilisation at its peak may have been between one and five million. (Note: McIntosh: "Population Growth and Distribution: "The prehistory of the Indo-Iranian borderlands shows a steady increase over time in the number and density of settlements based on farming and pastoralism. By contrast, the population of the Indus plains and adjacent regions lived mainly by hunting and gathering; the limited traces suggest their settlements were far fewer in number, and were small and widely scattered, though to some extent this apparent situation must reflect the difficulty of locating hunter-gatherer settlements. The presence of domestic animals in some hunter-gatherer settlements attests to contact with the people of the border-lands, probably in the context of pastoralists' seasonal movement from the hills into the plains. The potential for population expansion in the hills was severely limited, and so, from the fourth millennium into the third, settlers moved out from the borderlands into the plains and beyond into Gujarat, the first being pastoralists, followed later by farmers. The enormous potential of the greater Indus region offered scope for huge population increase; by the end of the Mature Harappan period, the Harappans are estimated to have numbered somewhere between 1 and 5 million, probably well below the region's carrying capacity.")

During its height the civilisation extended from Balochistan in the west to western Uttar Pradesh in the east, from northeastern Afghanistan in the north to Gujarat state in the south. The largest number of sites are in the Punjab region, Gujarat, Haryana, Rajasthan, Uttar Pradesh, Jammu and Kashmir states, Sindh, and Balochistan. Coastal settlements extended from Sutkagan Dor in Western Baluchistan to Lothal in Gujarat. An Indus Valley site has been found on the Oxus River at Shortugai in Afghanistan which is the northernmost site of the Indus Valley Civilisation, in the Gomal River valley in northwestern Pakistan, at Manda, Jammu on the Chenab River near Jammu, and at Alamgirpur on the Hindon River, only 28 km (17 mi) from Delhi. The southernmost site of the Indus Valley Civilisation is Daimabad in Maharashtra. Indus Valley sites have been found most often on rivers, but also on the ancient seacoast, for example, Balakot (Kot Bala), and on islands, for example, Dholavira.

== Discovery and history of excavation ==
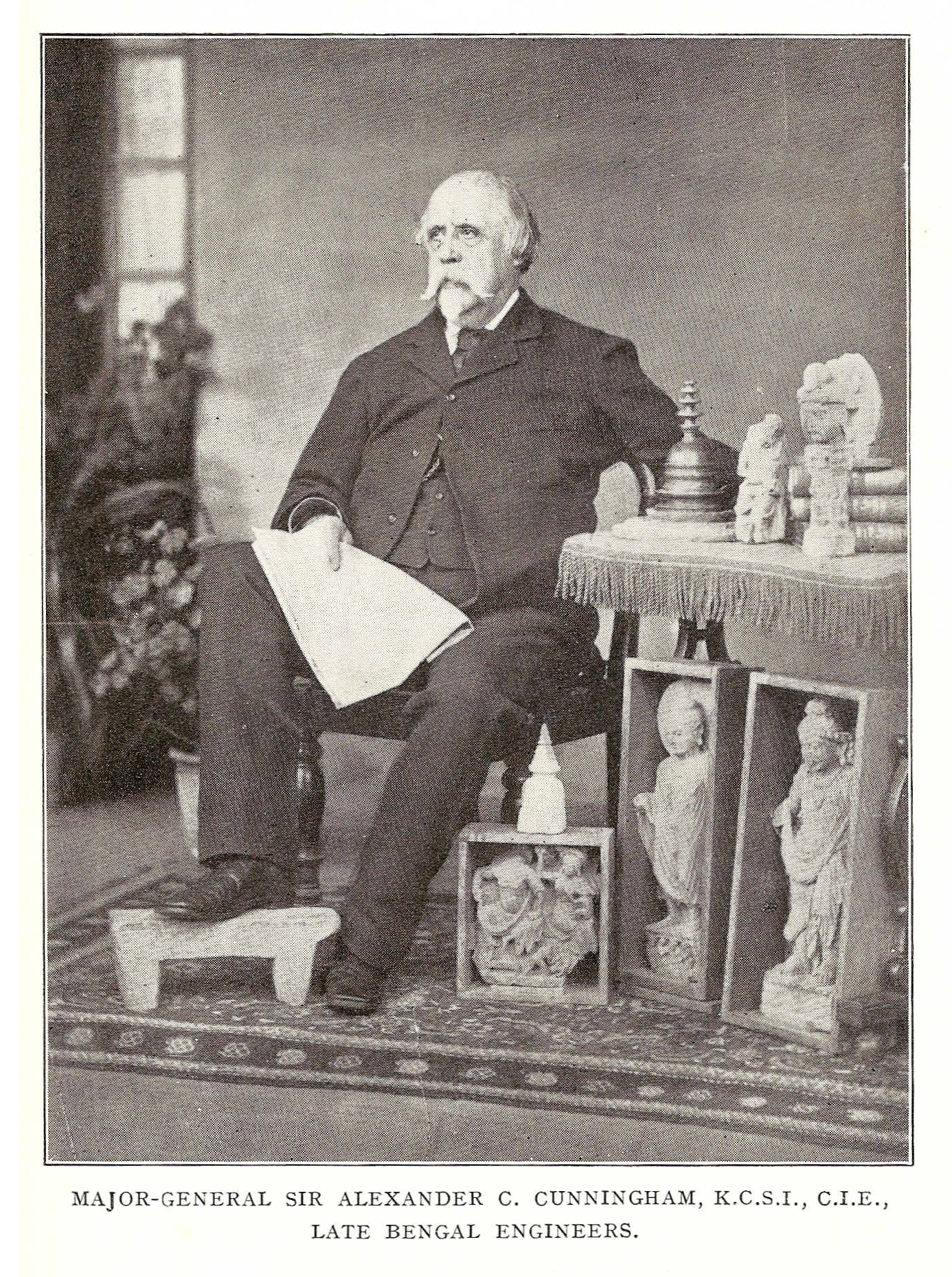
Alexander Cunningham, the first director general of the Archaeological Survey of India (ASI), interpreted a Harappan stamp seal in 1875.

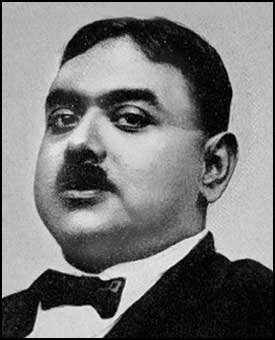
R. D. Banerji, an officer of the ASI, visited Mohenjo-daro in 1919–1920, and again in 1922–1923, postulating the site's far-off antiquity.

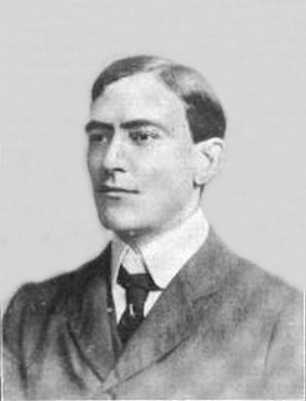
John Marshall, the director-general of the ASI from 1902 to 1928, who oversaw the excavations in Harappa and Mohenjo-daro, shown in a 1906 photograph

"Three other scholars whose names I cannot pass over in silence, are the late Mr. R. D. Banerji, to whom belongs the credit of having discovered, if not Mohenjo-daro itself, at any rate its high antiquity, and his immediate successors in the task of excavation, Messrs. M.S. Vats and K.N. Dikshit. ... no one probably except myself can fully appreciate the difficulties and hardships which they had to face in the three first seasons at Mohenjo-daro."

— From, John Marshall (ed), Mohenjo-daro and the Indus Civilization, London: Arthur Probsthain, 1931.

The first modern accounts of the ruins of the Indus civilisation are those of Charles Masson, a deserter from the East India Company's army. In 1829, Masson travelled through the princely state of Punjab, gathering useful intelligence for the Company in return for a promise of clemency. An aspect of this arrangement was the additional requirement to hand over to the Company any historical artifacts acquired during his travels. Masson, who had versed himself in the classics, especially in the military campaigns of Alexander the Great, chose for his wanderings some of the same towns that had featured in Alexander's campaigns, and whose archaeological sites had been noted by the campaign's chroniclers. Masson's major archaeological discovery in the Punjab was Harappa, a metropolis of the Indus civilisation in the valley of Indus's tributary, the Ravi River. Masson made copious notes and illustrations of Harappa's rich historical artifacts, many lying half-buried. In 1842, Masson included his observations of Harappa in the book Narrative of Various Journeys in Baluchistan, Afghanistan, and the Punjab. He dated the Harappa ruins to a period of recorded history, erroneously mistaking it to have been described earlier during Alexander's campaign. Masson was impressed by the site's extraordinary size and by several large mounds formed from long-existing erosion. (Note: Masson: "A long march preceded our arrival at Haripah, through jangal of the closest description ... When I joined the camp I found it in front of the village and ruinous brick castle. Behind us was a large circular mound, or eminence, and to the west was an irregular rocky height, crowned with the remains of buildings, in fragments of walls, with niches, after the eastern manner ... Tradition affirms the existence here of a city, so considerable that it extended to Chicha Watni, thirteen cosses distant, and that it was destroyed by a particular visitation of Providence, brought down by the lust and crimes of the sovereign.")

Two years later, the Company contracted Alexander Burnes to sail up the Indus to assess the feasibility of water travel for its army. Burnes, who also stopped in Harappa, noted the baked bricks employed in the site's ancient masonry, but noted also the haphazard plundering of these bricks by the local population.

Despite these reports, Harappa was raided even more perilously for its bricks after the British annexation of the Punjab in 1848–49. A considerable number were carted away as track ballast for the railway lines being laid in the Punjab. Nearly 160 km (100 mi) of railway track between Multan and Lahore, laid in the mid-1850s, was supported by Harappan bricks.

In 1861, three years after the dissolution of the East India Company and the establishment of Crown rule in India, archaeology on the subcontinent became more formally organised with the founding of the Archaeological Survey of India (ASI). Alexander Cunningham, the Survey's first director-general, who had visited Harappa in 1853 and had noted the imposing brick walls, visited again to carry out a survey, but this time of a site whose entire upper layer had been stripped in the interim. Although his original goal of demonstrating Harappa to be a lost Buddhist city mentioned in the seventh century CE travels of the Chinese visitor, Xuanzang, proved elusive, Cunningham did publish his findings in 1875. For the first time, he interpreted a Harappan stamp seal, with its unknown script, which he concluded to be of an origin foreign to India.

Archaeological work in Harappa thereafter lagged until a new viceroy of India, Lord Curzon, pushed through the Ancient Monuments Preservation Act 1904, and appointed John Marshall to lead the ASI. Several years later, Hiranand Sastri, who had been assigned by Marshall to survey Harappa, reported it to be of non-Buddhist origin, and by implication more ancient. Expropriating Harappa for the ASI under the Act, Marshall directed ASI archaeologist Daya Ram Sahni to excavate the site's two mounds.

Farther south, along the main stem of the Indus in Sind province, the largely undisturbed site of Mohenjo-daro had attracted notice. Marshall deputed a succession of ASI officers to survey the site. These included D. R. Bhandarkar (1911), R. D. Banerji (1919, 1922–1923), and M. S. Vats (1924). In 1923, on his second visit to Mohenjo-daro, Baneriji wrote to Marshall about the site, postulating an origin in "remote antiquity", and noting a congruence of some of its artifacts with those of Harappa. Later in 1923, Vats, also in correspondence with Marshall, noted the same more specifically about the seals and the script found at both sites. On the weight of these opinions, Marshall ordered crucial data from the two sites to be brought to one location and invited Banerji and Sahni to a joint discussion. By 1924, Marshall had become convinced of the significance of the finds, and on 24 September 1924, made a tentative but conspicuous public intimation in the Illustrated London News:

"Not often has it been given to archaeologists, as it was given to Schliemann at Tiryns and Mycenae, or to Stein in the deserts of Turkestan, to light upon the remains of a long forgotten civilisation. It looks, however, at this moment, as if we were on the threshold of such a discovery in the plains of the Indus."

In the next issue, a week later, the British Assyriologist Archibald Sayce was able to point to very similar seals found in Bronze Age levels in Mesopotamia and Iran, giving the first strong indication of their date; confirmations from other archaeologists followed. Systematic excavations began in Mohenjo-daro in 1924–25 with that of K. N. Dikshit, continuing with those of H. Hargreaves (1925–1926), and Ernest J. H. Mackay (1927–1931). By 1931, much of Mohenjo-daro had been excavated, but occasional excavations continued, such as the one led by Mortimer Wheeler, a new director-general of the ASI appointed in 1944, and including Ahmad Hasan Dani.

After the partition of India in 1947, when most excavated sites of the Indus Valley Civilisation lay in territory awarded to Pakistan, the Archaeological Survey of India, its area of authority reduced, carried out large numbers of surveys and excavations along the Ghaggar-Hakra system in India. (Note: Guha: "The intense explorations to locate sites related to the Indus civilisation along the Ghaggar-Hakra, mostly by the Archaeological Survey of India immediately after Indian independence (from the 1950s through the 1970s), although ostensibly following Sir Aurel Stein's explorations in 1942, were to a large extent initiated by a patriotic zeal to compensate for the loss of this more ancient civilisation by the newly freed nation; as apart from Rangpur (Gujarat) and Kotla Nihang Khan (Punjab), the sites remained in Pakistan.") Some speculated that the Ghaggar-Hakra system might yield more sites than the Indus river basin. According to archaeologist Shireen Ratnagar, many Ghaggar-Hakra sites in India are actually those of local cultures, with distinctive local potterry, but which had contacts with Harappan civilisation; few are fully developed Harappan sites. As of 1977, about 90% of the Indus script seals and inscribed objects discovered were found at sites in Pakistan along the Indus river, while other sites accounts only for the remaining 10%. (Note: Number of Indus script inscribed objects and seals obtained from various Harappan sites: 1540 from Mohanjodaro, 985 from Harappa, 66 from Chanhudaro, 165 from Lothal, 99 from Kalibangan, 7 from Banawali, 6 from Ur in Iraq, 5 from Surkotada, 4 from Chandigarh) By 2002, over 1,000 Mature Harappan cities and settlements had been reported, of which just under a hundred had been excavated, mainly in the general region of the Indus and Ghaggar-Hakra rivers and their tributaries; however, there are only five major urban sites: Harappa, Mohenjo-daro, Dholavira, Ganeriwala and Rakhigarhi. As of 2008, about 616 sites have been reported in India, whereas 406 sites have been reported in Pakistan.

Unlike India, in which after 1947, the ASI attempted to "Indianise" archaeological work in keeping with the new nation's goals of national unity and historical continuity, in Pakistan the national imperative was the promotion of Islamic heritage, and consequently archaeological work on early sites was left to foreign archaeologists. After the partition, Mortimer Wheeler, the Director of ASI from 1944, oversaw the establishment of archaeological institutions in Pakistan, later joining a UNESCO effort tasked to conserve the site at Mohenjo-daro. Other international efforts at Mohenjo-daro and Harappa have included the German Aachen Research Project Mohenjo-daro, the Italian Mission to Mohenjo-daro, and the US Harappa Archaeological Research Project (HARP) founded by George F. Dales. Following a chance flash flood which exposed a portion of an archaeological site at the foot of the Bolan Pass in Balochistan, excavations were carried out in Mehrgarh by French archaeologist Jean-François Jarrige and his team in the early 1970s.

== Chronology ==
The cities of the ancient Indus had "social hierarchies, their writing system, their large planned cities and their long-distance trade [which] mark them to archaeologists as a full-fledged 'civilisation.' The mature phase of the Harappan civilisation lasted from c. 2600–1900 BCE. With the inclusion of the predecessor and successor cultures – Early Harappan and Late Harappan, respectively – the entire Indus Valley Civilisation may be taken to have lasted from the 33rd to the 14th centuries BCE. It is part of the Indus Valley Tradition, which also includes the pre-Harappan occupation of Mehrgarh, the earliest farming site of the Indus Valley.

Several periodisations are employed for the IVC. The most commonly used classifies the Indus Valley Civilisation into Early, Mature and Late Harappan Phase. An alternative approach by Shaffer divides the broader Indus Valley Tradition into four eras, the pre-Harappan "Early Food Producing Era", and the Regionalisation, Integration, and Localisation eras, which correspond roughly with the Early Harappan, Mature Harappan, and Late Harappan phases.

| Dates (BCE) | Main phase | Mehrgarh phases | Harappan phases | Post-Harappan phases | Era |
|---|---|---|---|---|---|
| 7000–5500 | Pre-Harappan | Mehrgarh I (aceramic Neolithic) | | | Early Food Producing Era |
| 5500–3300 | Pre-Harappan/Early Harappan | Mehrgarh II–VI (ceramic Neolithic) | | | Regionalisation Era c. 4000–2500/2300 (Shaffer) c. 5000–3200 (Coningham & Young) |
| 3300–2800 | Early Harappan c. 3300–2800 (Mughal) c. 5000–2800 (Kenoyer) | | Harappan 1 (Ravi Phase; Hakra Ware) | | Regionalisation Era c. 4000–2500/2300 (Shaffer) c. 5000–3200 (Coningham & Young) |
| 2800–2600 | Early Harappan c. 3300–2800 (Mughal) c. 5000–2800 (Kenoyer) | Mehrgarh VII | Harappan 2 (Kot Diji Phase, Nausharo I) | | Regionalisation Era c. 4000–2500/2300 (Shaffer) c. 5000–3200 (Coningham & Young) |
| 2600–2450 | Mature Harappan (Indus Valley Civilisation) | | Harappan 3A (Nausharo II) | | Integration Era |
| 2450–2200 | Mature Harappan (Indus Valley Civilisation) | | Harappan 3B | | Integration Era |
| 2200–1900 | Mature Harappan (Indus Valley Civilisation) | | Harappan 3C | | Integration Era |
| 1900–1700 | Late Harappan | | Harappan 4 | Cemetery H Ochre Coloured Pottery | Localisation Era |
| 1700–1300 | Late Harappan | | Harappan 5 | Cemetery H Ochre Coloured Pottery | Localisation Era |
| 1300–600 | Post-Harappan Iron Age India | | | Painted Grey Ware (1200–600); Vedic period (c. 1500–500) | Regionalisation c. 1200–300 (Kenoyer) c. 1500–600 (Coningham & Young) |
| 600–300 | Post-Harappan Iron Age India | | | Northern Black Polished Ware (Iron Age) (700–200); Second urbanisation (c. 500–200) | Integration |

== Pre-Harappan era: Mehrgarh ==
Mehrgarh is a Neolithic (7000 BCE to c. 2500 BCE) mountain site in the Balochistan province of Pakistan, which gave new insights on the emergence of the Indus Valley Civilisation. (Note: According to Ahmad Hasan Dani, professor emeritus at Quaid-e-Azam University, Islamabad, the discovery of Mehrgarh "changed the entire concept of the Indus civilisation ... There we have the whole sequence, right from the beginning of settled village life.") Mehrgarh is one of the earliest sites with evidence of farming and herding in South Asia. Mehrgarh was influenced by the Near Eastern Neolithic, with similarities between "domesticated wheat varieties, early phases of farming, pottery, other archaeological artefacts, some domesticated plants and herd animals". (Note: According to Gangal et al. (2014), there is strong archeological and geographical evidence that neolithic farming spread from the Near East into north-west India. Gangal et al. (2014): "There are several lines of evidence that support the idea of a connection between the Neolithic in the Near East and in the Indian subcontinent. The prehistoric site of Mehrgarh in Baluchistan (modern Pakistan) is the earliest Neolithic site in the north-west Indian subcontinent, dated as early as 8500 BCE.")

Jean-Francois Jarrige argues for an independent origin of Mehrgarh. Jarrige notes "the assumption that farming economy was introduced full-fledged from Near-East to South Asia", (Note: Neolithic domesticated crops in Mehrgarh include more than 90% barley and a small amount of wheat. There is good evidence for the local domestication of barley and the zebu cattle at Mehrgarh, but the wheat varieties are suggested to be of Near-Eastern origin, as the modern distribution of wild varieties of wheat is limited to Northern Levant and Southern Turkey. A detailed satellite map study of a few archaeological sites in the Baluchistan and Khybar Pakhtunkhwa regions also suggests similarities in early phases of farming with sites in Western Asia. Pottery prepared by sequential slab construction, circular fire pits filled with burnt pebbles, and large granaries are common to both Mehrgarh and many Mesopotamian sites. The postures of the skeletal remains in graves at Mehrgarh bear strong resemblance to those at Ali Kosh in the Zagros Mountains of southern Iran. Clay figurines found in Mehrgarh resemble those discovered at Teppe Zagheh on the Qazvin plain south of the Elburz range in Iran (the 7th millennium BCE) and Jeitun in Turkmenistan (the 6th millennium BCE). Strong arguments have been made for the Near-Eastern origin of some domesticated plants and herd animals at Jeitun in Turkmenistan (pp. 225–227).) (Note: The Near East is separated from the Indus Valley by the arid plateaus, ridges and deserts of Iran and Afghanistan, where rainfall agriculture is possible only in the foothills and cul-de-sac valleys. Nevertheless, this area was not an insurmountable obstacle for the dispersal of the Neolithic. The route south of the Caspian sea is a part of the Silk Road, some sections of which were in use from at least 3,000 BCE, connecting Badakhshan (north-eastern Afghanistan and south-eastern Tajikistan) with Western Asia, Egypt and India. Similarly, the section from Badakhshan to the Mesopotamian plains (the Great Khorasan Road) was apparently functioning by 4,000 BCE and numerous prehistoric sites are located along it, whose assemblages are dominated by the Cheshmeh-Ali (Tehran Plain) ceramic technology, forms and designs. Striking similarities in figurines and pottery styles, and mud-brick shapes, between widely separated early Neolithic sites in the Zagros Mountains of north-western Iran (Jarmo and Sarab), the Deh Luran Plain in southwestern Iran (Tappeh Ali Kosh and Chogha Sefid), Susiana (Chogha Bonut and Chogha Mish), the Iranian Central Plateau (Tappeh-Sang-e Chakhmaq), and Turkmenistan (Jeitun) suggest a common incipient culture. The Neolithic dispersal across South Asia plausibly involved migration of the population. This possibility is also supported by Y-chromosome and mtDNA analyses.) and the similarities between Neolithic sites from eastern Mesopotamia and the western Indus valley, which are evidence of a "cultural continuum" between those sites. But given the originality of Mehrgarh, Jarrige concludes that Mehrgarh has an earlier local background, and is not a "'backwater' of the Neolithic culture of the Near East".

Lukacs and Hemphill suggest an initial local development of Mehrgarh, with a continuity in cultural development but a change in population. According to Lukacs and Hemphill, while there is a strong continuity between the Neolithic and Chalcolithic (Copper Age) cultures of Mehrgarh, dental evidence shows that the Chalcolithic population did not descend from the Neolithic population of Mehrgarh, which "suggests moderate levels of gene flow". (Note: They further noted that "the direct lineal descendents of the Neolithic inhabitants of Mehrgarh are to be found to the south and the east of Mehrgarh, in northwestern India and the western edge of the Deccan plateau", with Neolithic Mehrgarh showing greater affinity with Chalcolithic Inamgaon, south of Mehrgarh, than with Chalcolithic Mehrgarh.) Mascarenhas et al. (2015) note that "new, possibly West Asian, body types are reported from the graves of Mehrgarh beginning in the Togau phase (3800 BCE)."

Gallego Romero et al. (2011) state that their research on lactose tolerance in India suggests that "the west Eurasian genetic contribution identified by Reich et al. (2009) principally reflects gene flow from Iran and the Middle East." They further note that "[t]he earliest evidence of cattle herding in South Asia comes from the Indus River Valley site of Mehrgarh and is dated to 7,000 YBP." (Note: Gallego romero et al. (2011) refer to (Meadow 1993): Meadow RH. 1993. "Animal domestication in the Middle East: a revised view from the eastern margin". In: Possehl G, editor. Harappan civilization. New Delhi: Oxford University Press and India Book House. pp. 295–320.)

== Early Harappan ==
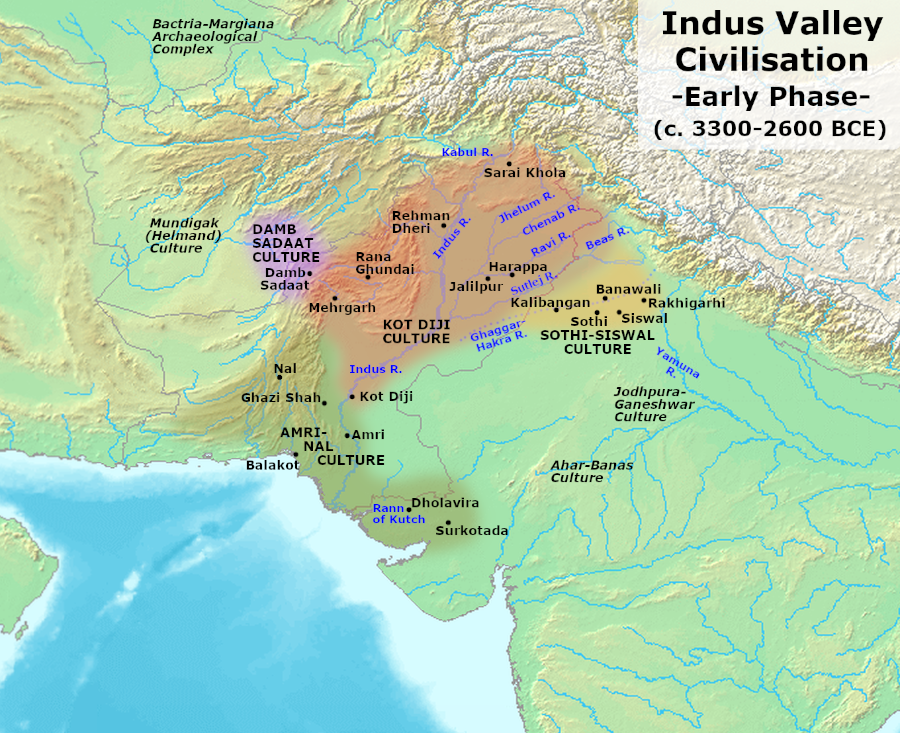
Early Harappan Period, c. 3300–2600 BCE

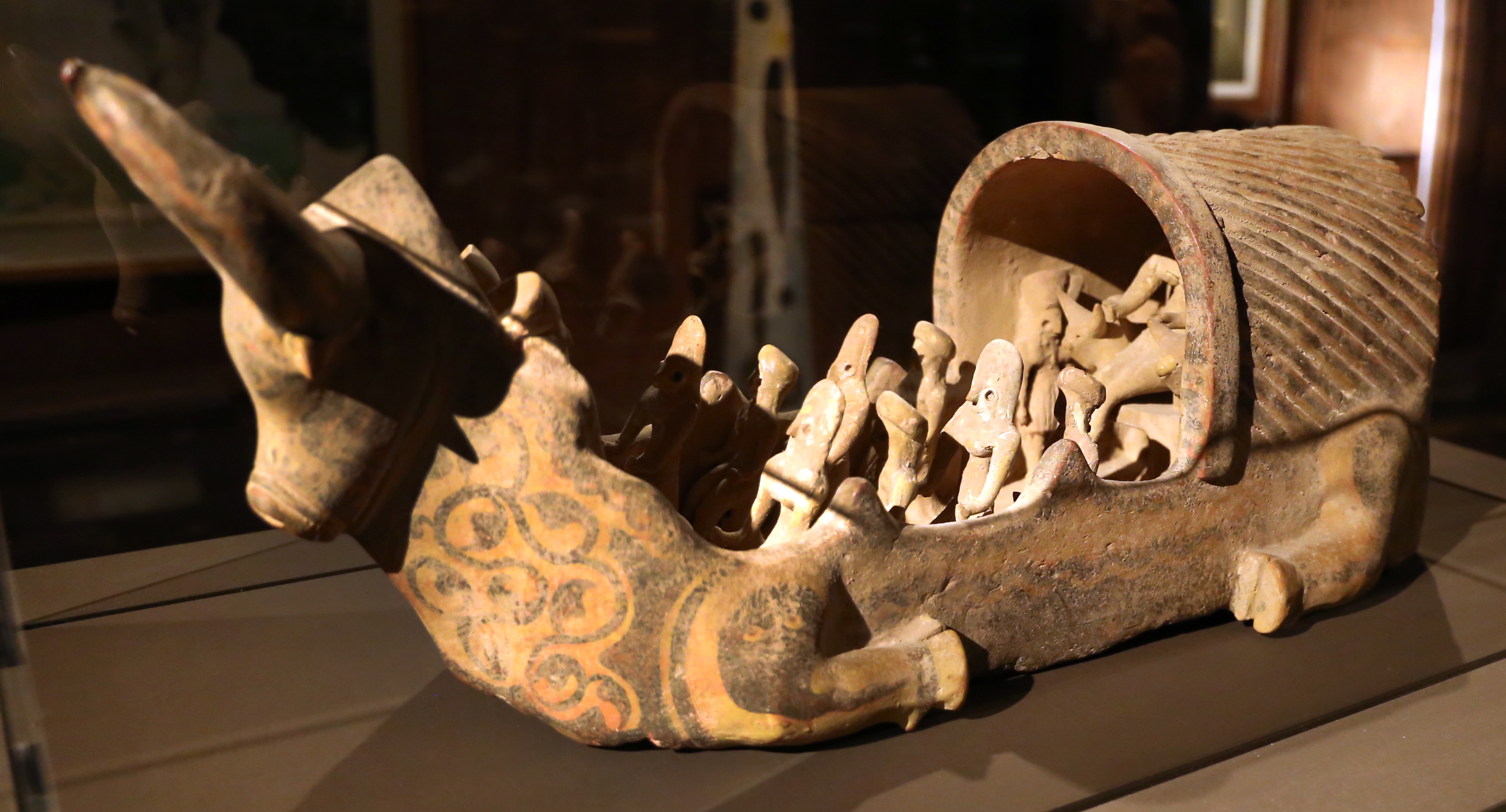
Terracotta boat in the shape of a bull, and female figurines. Kot Diji period (c. 2800–2600 BC).

The Early Harappan Ravi Phase, named after the nearby Ravi River, lasted from c. 3300 BCE until 2800 BCE. It started when farmers from the mountains gradually moved between their mountain homes and the lowland river valleys, and is related to the Hakra Phase, identified in the Ghaggar-Hakra River Valley to the west, and predates the Kot Diji Phase (2800–2600 BCE, Harappan 2), named after a site in northern Sindh, Pakistan, near Mohenjo-daro. The earliest examples of the Indus script date to the 3rd millennium BCE.

The mature phase of earlier village cultures is represented by Rehman Dheri and Amri in Pakistan. Kot Diji represents the phase leading up to Mature Harappan, with the citadel representing centralised authority and an increasingly urban quality of life. Another town of this stage was found at Kalibangan in India on the Hakra River.

Trade networks linked this culture with related regional cultures and distant sources of raw materials, including lapis lazuli and other materials for bead-making. By this time, villagers had domesticated numerous crops, including peas, sesame seeds, dates, and cotton, as well as animals, including the water buffalo. Early Harappan communities turned to large urban centres by 2600 BCE, from where the mature Harappan phase started. The latest research shows that Indus Valley people migrated from villages to cities.

The final stages of the Early Harappan period are characterised by the building of large walled settlements, the expansion of trade networks, and the increasing integration of regional communities into a "relatively uniform" material culture in terms of pottery styles, ornaments, and stamp seals with Indus script, leading into the transition to the Mature Harappan phase.

== Mature Harappan ==
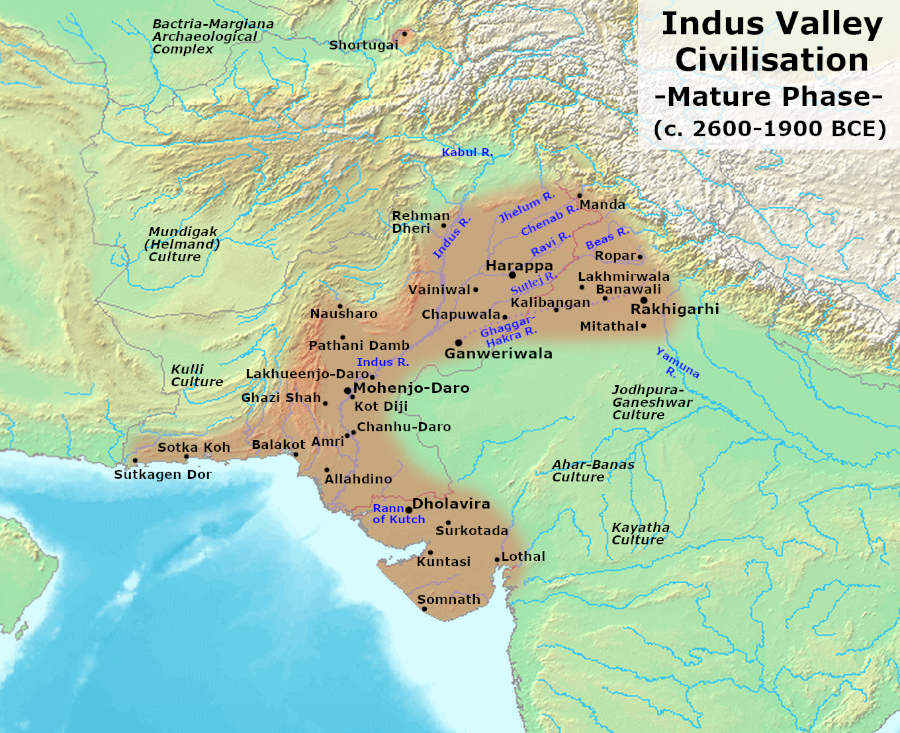
Mature Harappan Period, c. 2600–1900 BCE

Mature Harappan

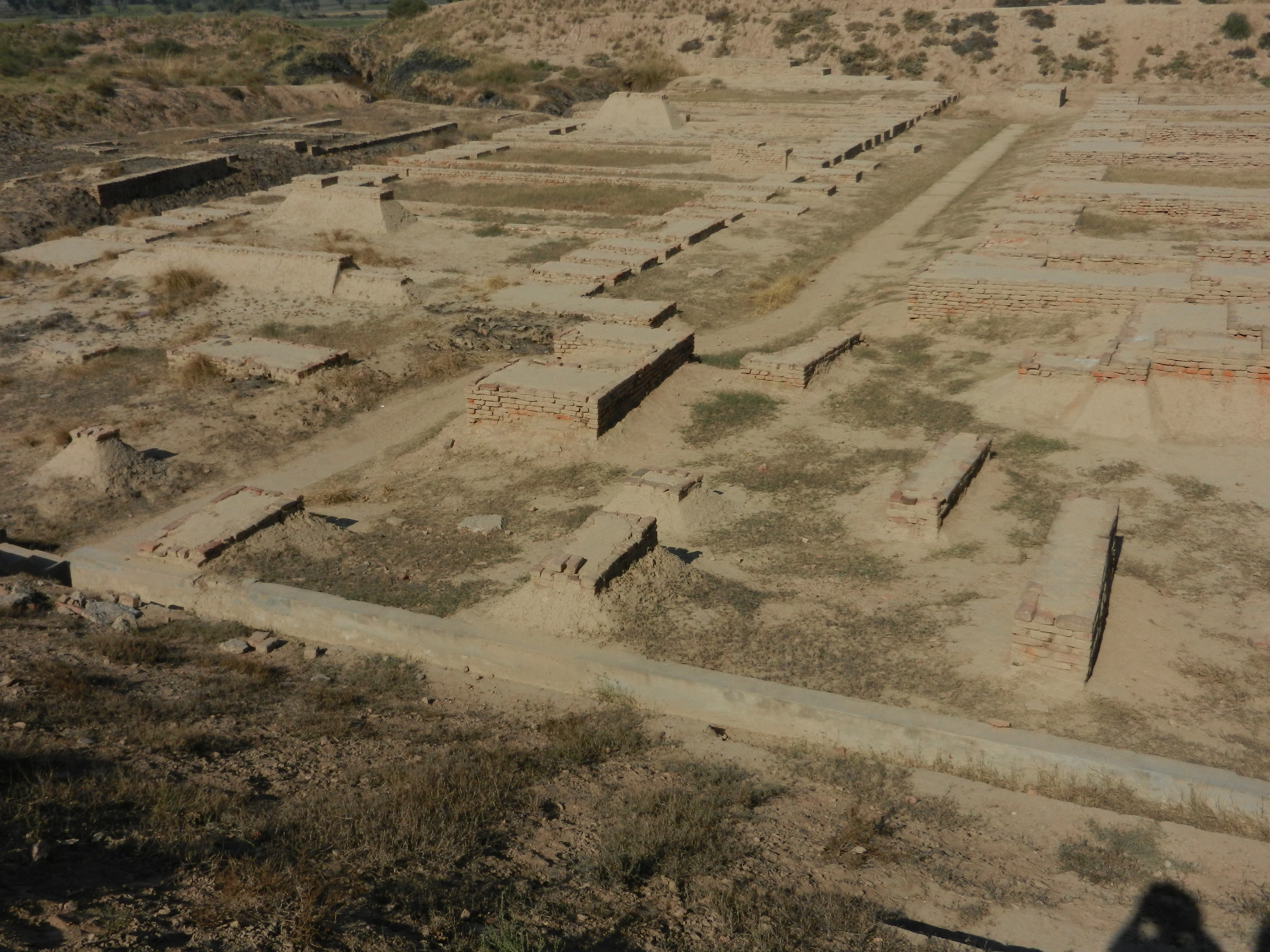
View of Granary and Great Hall on Mound F in Harappa

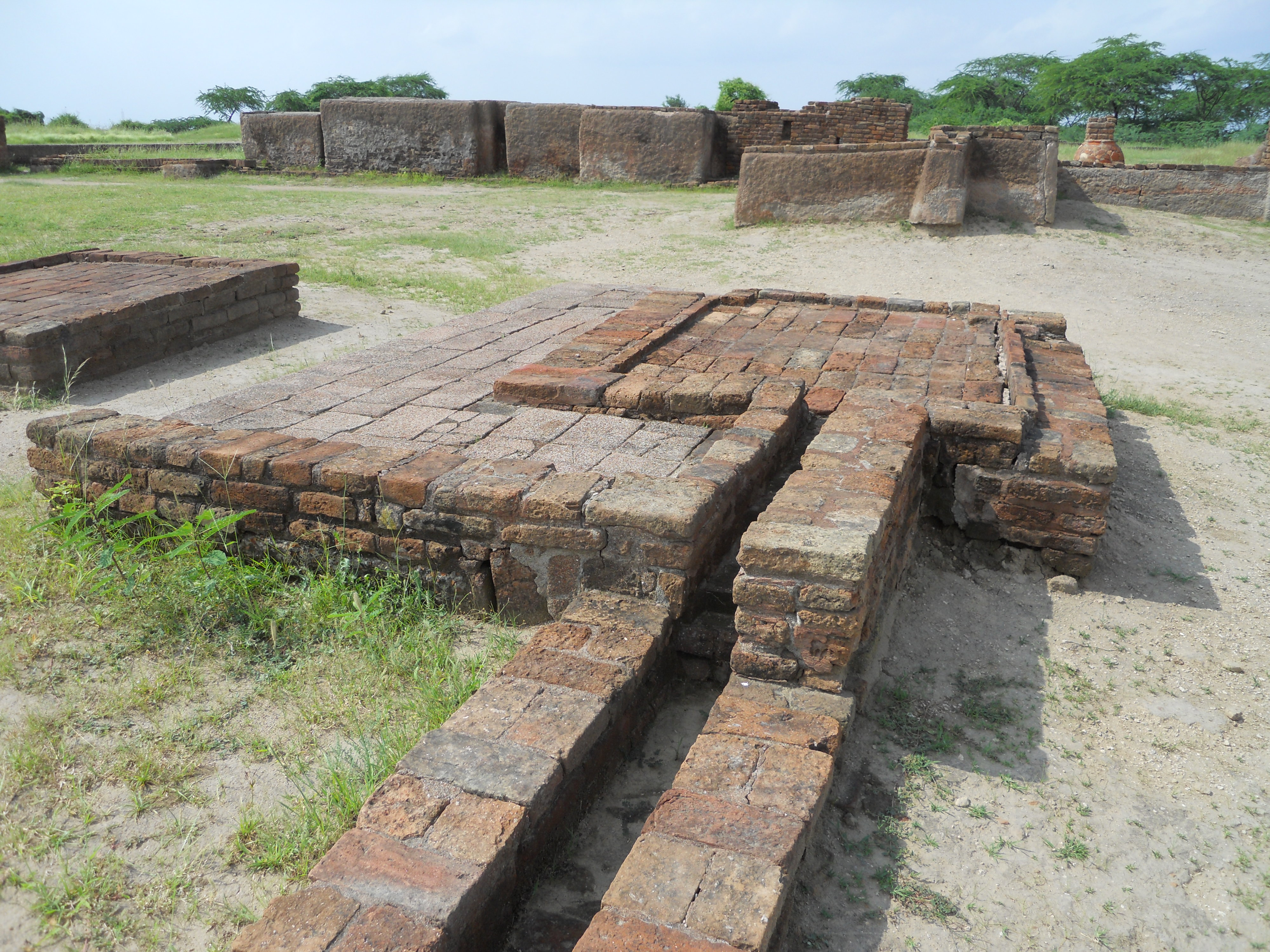
Archaeological remains of washroom drainage system at Lothal

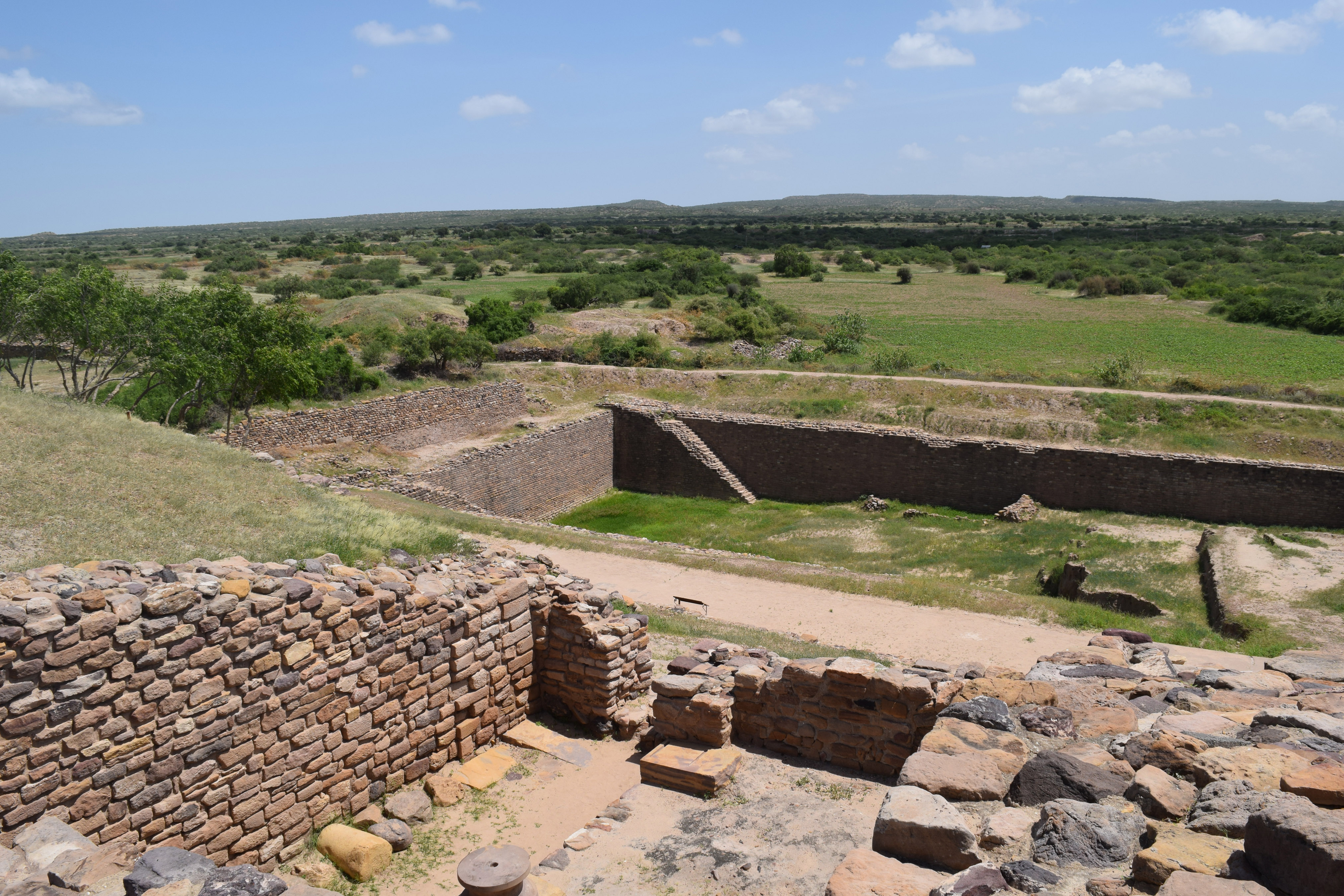
Dholavira in Gujarat, India, is one of the largest cities of Indus Valley Civilisation, with stepwell steps to reach the water level in artificially constructed reservoirs.

According to Giosan et al. (2012), the slow southward migration of the monsoons across Asia initially allowed the Indus Valley villages to develop by taming the floods of the Indus and its tributaries. Flood-supported farming led to large agricultural surpluses, which in turn supported the development of cities. The IVC residents did not develop irrigation capabilities, relying mainly on the seasonal monsoons leading to summer floods. Brooke further notes that the development of advanced cities coincides with a reduction in rainfall, which may have triggered a reorganisation into larger urban centres.

According to J.G. Shaffer and D.A. Lichtenstein, the Mature Harappan civilisation was "a fusion of the Bagor, Hakra, and Kot Diji traditions or 'ethnic groups' in the Ghaggar-Hakra valley on the borders of India and Pakistan".

Also, according to a more recent summary by Maisels (2003), "The Harappan oecumene formed from a Kot Dijian/Amri-Nal synthesis". He also says that, in the development of complexity, the site of Mohenjo-daro has priority, along with the Hakra-Ghaggar cluster of sites, "where Hakra wares actually precede the Kot Diji related material". He sees these areas as "catalytic in producing the fusion from Hakra, Kot Dijian and Amri-Nal cultural elements that resulted in the gestalt we recognize as Early Harappan (Early Indus)."

By 2600 BCE, the Early Harappan communities turned into large urban centres. Such urban centres include Harappa, Ganeriwala, Mohenjo-daro in modern-day Pakistan, and Dholavira, Kalibangan, Rakhigarhi, Rupar, and Lothal in modern-day India. In total, more than 1,000 settlements have been found, mainly in the general region of the Indus and Ghaggar-Hakra Rivers and their tributaries.

=== Cities ===
A sophisticated and technologically advanced urban culture is evident in the Indus Valley Civilisation, making them the first urban centre in the region. The high degree of forward-looking urban planning demonstrates the existence of well-organised local governments capable of formulating and executing a large-scale forward-looking development program, and which placed a high value on public health and hygiene, or, alternatively, accessibility to the means of religious ritual.

As seen in Harappa, Mohenjo-daro and the 2010s partially excavated Rakhigarhi, this urban plan included the world's first known city sanitation systems. Within the city, individual homes or groups of homes obtained water from wells. From a room that appears to have been set aside for bathing, waste water was directed to covered drains, which lined the major streets. Houses opened only to inner courtyards and smaller lanes. The housebuilding in some villages in the region still resembles in some respects the housebuilding of the Harappans. (Note: It has been noted that the courtyard pattern and techniques of flooring of Harappan houses has similarities to the way house-building is still done in some villages of the region.)

The Indus Valley cities developed elaborate drainage and sewerage systems, described by archaeologists as well-planned and advanced compared with many contemporary societies. Their urban architecture included dockyards, granaries, warehouses, brick platforms, and massive protective walls, which were likely intended both as flood defences and as fortifications.

The purpose of the citadel remains debated. In sharp contrast to this civilisation's contemporaries, Mesopotamia and ancient Egypt, no large monumental structures were built. There is no conclusive evidence of palaces or temples. Some structures are thought to have been granaries. Found at one city is an enormous well-built bath (the "Great Bath"), which may have been a public bath. Although the citadels were walled, it is far from clear that these structures were defensive; many may have been flood defences.

Most city dwellers appear to have been traders or artisans, who lived with others pursuing the same occupation in well-defined neighbourhoods. Materials from distant regions were used in the cities for constructing seals, beads and other objects. Among the artefacts discovered were beautiful glazed faïence beads. Steatite seals have images of animals, people (perhaps gods), and other types of inscriptions, including the yet un-deciphered writing system of the Indus Valley Civilisation. Some of the seals were used to stamp clay on trade goods.

Although some houses were larger than others, Indus Valley Civilisation cities were remarkable for their apparent, if relative, egalitarianism. All the houses had access to water and drainage facilities. This gives the impression of a society with relatively low wealth concentration.

=== Authority and governance ===
Archaeological records provide no immediate answers for the question of who ruled Harappan cities and how. Nonetheless, there are indications of complex decisions being taken and large-scale mobilisation of resources. For instance, the majority of the cities were constructed in a highly uniform and well-planned grid pattern, divided into two levels from ground making one part slightly higher than the other; such complex urban planning, combined with the construction of large public works projects, demonstrates the existence of some sort of planning authority. The remarkable consistency of Harappan weights and measures, as evident in pottery, seals, weights and bricks, also indicates the existence of a central authority able to make definitive regulations.

These are some major theories:

- There was a single state or federation ruling all or most of the Indus Valley. Proponents of this theory believe that the presence of standardised weights and measures demonstrates the presence of a central authority.
- There was no single ruler, with each city being a self-governing city state.

=== Metallurgy ===
Copper was abundant at Indus sites, as revealed by archaeology. In his 2019 study of Harappan and Indus copper industry, Brett Hoffman analysed extensive copper/bronze assemblages from Harappa. He used advanced techniques such as Scanning Electron Microscopy (SEM), to understand production, consumption, and trade in copper ore. The study revealed regional patterns and detailed technological aspects of bronze production in Harappa and in Indus Valley Civilisation more generally. Indus bronze was alloyed with tin, arsenic and lead.

Hoffman examined a large collections of copper/bronze artifacts from Harappa, covering the timeline from 3300 to 1700 BCE, and challenged some older broad interpretations of bronze production. He studied how copper was acquired, processed, and used for diverse items, such as tools and prestige goods. The production increased especially starting with the Kot Diji Phase, but the Early Harappan groups were already well acquainted with copper metallurgy.

Major copper and copper ore sources used by Indus Valley Civilisation included Rajasthan (Khetri mines) and as far as Oman, and Bahrain. The Aravalli Range in northwestern India was particularly important.

A touchstone bearing gold streaks was found in Banawali, which was probably used for testing the purity of gold (such a technique is still used in some parts of India).

Contrary to the older ideas of elite control over metal production, recent research indicates that access to copper and bronze was relatively widespread throughout the Indus society.

=== Metrology ===
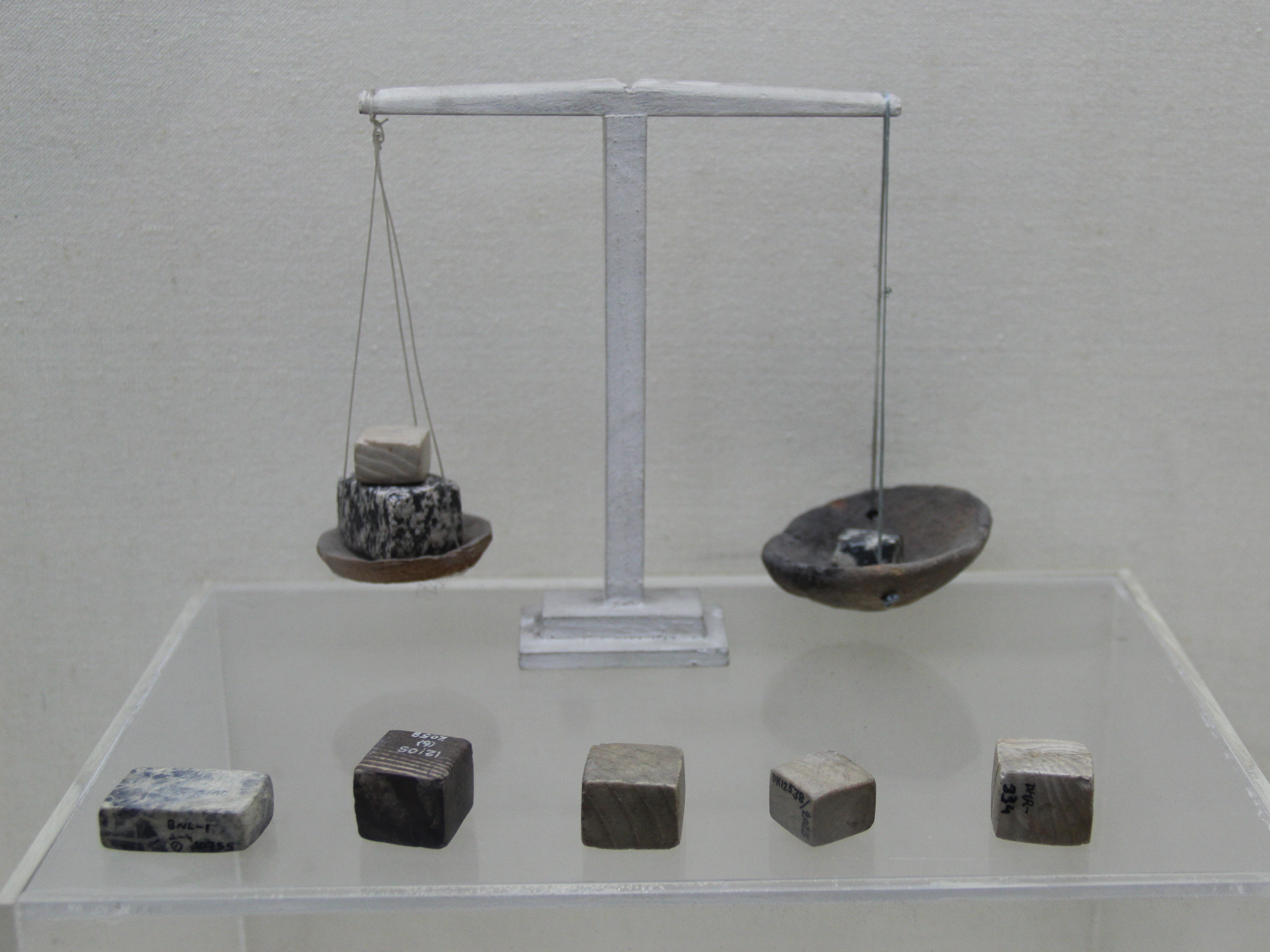
Harappan weights found in the Indus Valley (National Museum, New Delhi)

The people of the Indus Valley Civilisation achieved great accuracy in measuring length, mass, and time. They were among the first to develop a system of uniform weights and measures. A comparison of available objects indicates large scale variation across the Indus territories. Their smallest division, which is marked on an ivory scale found in Lothal in Gujarat, was approximately 1.704 mm, the smallest division ever recorded on a scale of the Bronze Age. Harappan engineers followed the decimal division of measurement for all practical purposes, including the measurement of mass as revealed by their hexahedron weights.

These chert weights were in a ratio of 5:2:1 with weights of 0.05, 0.1, 0.2, 0.5, 1, 2, 5, 10, 20, 50, 100, 200, and 500 units, with each unit weighing approximately 28 grams, similar to the English Imperial ounce or Greek uncia, and smaller objects were weighed in similar ratios with the units of 0.871. However, as in other cultures, actual weights were not uniform throughout the area. The weights and measures later used in Kautilya's Arthashastra (4th century BCE) are the same as those used in Lothal.

=== Arts and crafts ===
Many Indus Valley seals and items in pottery and terracotta have been found, along with a very few stone sculptures and some gold jewellery and bronze vessels. Some anatomically detailed figurines in terracotta, bronze, and steatite have been found at excavation sites, the former probably mostly toys. The Harappans also made various toys and games, among them cubical dice (with one to six holes on the faces), which were found in sites like Mohenjo-daro.

The terracotta figurines included cows, bears, monkeys, and dogs. The animal depicted on a majority of seals at sites of the mature period has not been clearly identified. Part bull, part zebra, with a majestic horn, it has been a source of speculation. As yet, there is insufficient evidence to substantiate claims that the image had religious or cultic significance, but the prevalence of the image raises the question of whether or not the animals in images of the IVC are religious symbols.

Many crafts including, "shell working, ceramics, and agate and glazed steatite bead making" were practised and the pieces were used in the making of necklaces, bangles, and other ornaments from all phases of Harappan culture. Some of these crafts are still practised in the subcontinent today. Some make-up and toiletry items (a special kind of combs (kakai), the use of collyrium and a special three-in-one toiletry gadget) that were found in Harappan contexts still have similar counterparts in modern India. Terracotta female figurines were found (c. 2800–2600 BCE) which had red colour applied to the "manga" (line of partition of the hair).

Archeological remains from 3000 to 2000 BC have been found from the city of Lothal of pieces on a board that resemble chess.

The finds from Mohenjo-daro were initially deposited in the Lahore Museum, but later moved to the ASI headquarters at New Delhi, where a new "Central Imperial Museum" was being planned for the new capital of the British Raj, in which at least a selection would be displayed. It became apparent that Indian independence was approaching, but the Partition of India was not anticipated until late in the process. The new Pakistani authorities requested the return of the Mohenjo-daro pieces excavated on their territory, but the Indian authorities refused. Eventually an agreement was reached, whereby the finds, totalling some 12,000 objects (most sherds of pottery), were split equally between the countries; in some cases this was taken very literally, with some necklaces and girdles having their beads separated into two piles. In the case of the "two most celebrated sculpted figures", Pakistan asked for and received the so-called Priest-King figure, while India retained the much smaller Dancing Girl.

Though written considerably later, the arts treatise Natya Shastra (c. 200 BCE – 200 CE) classifies musical instruments into four groups based on their means of acoustical production—strings, membranes, solid materials and air—and it is probable that such instruments had existed since the IVC. Archeological evidence indicates the use of simple rattles and vessel flutes, while iconographical evidence suggests early harps and drums were also used. An ideogram in the IVC contains the earliest known depiction of an arched harp, dated sometime before 1800 BCE.

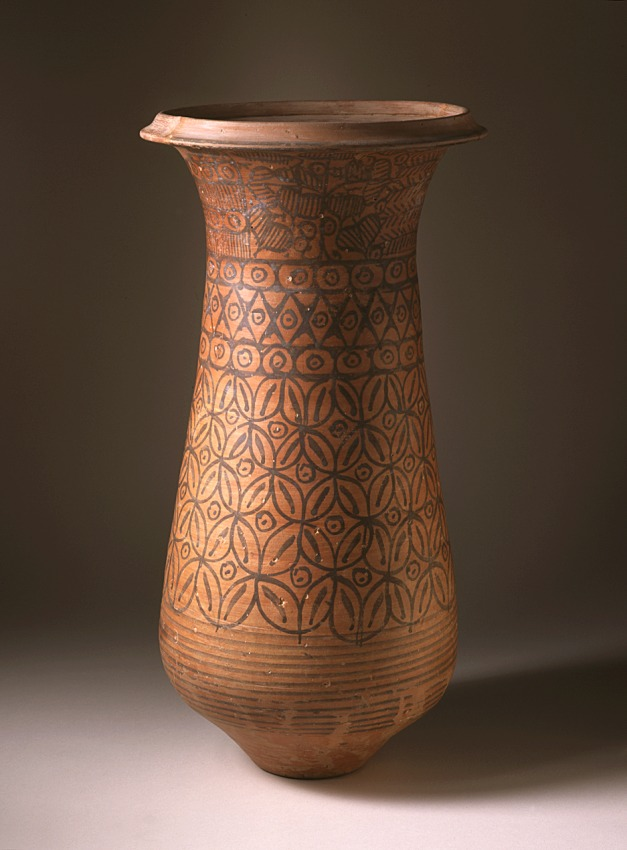
Ceremonial vessel; 2600–2450 BC; terracotta with black paint; 49.53 × 25.4 cm; Los Angeles County Museum of Art (US)

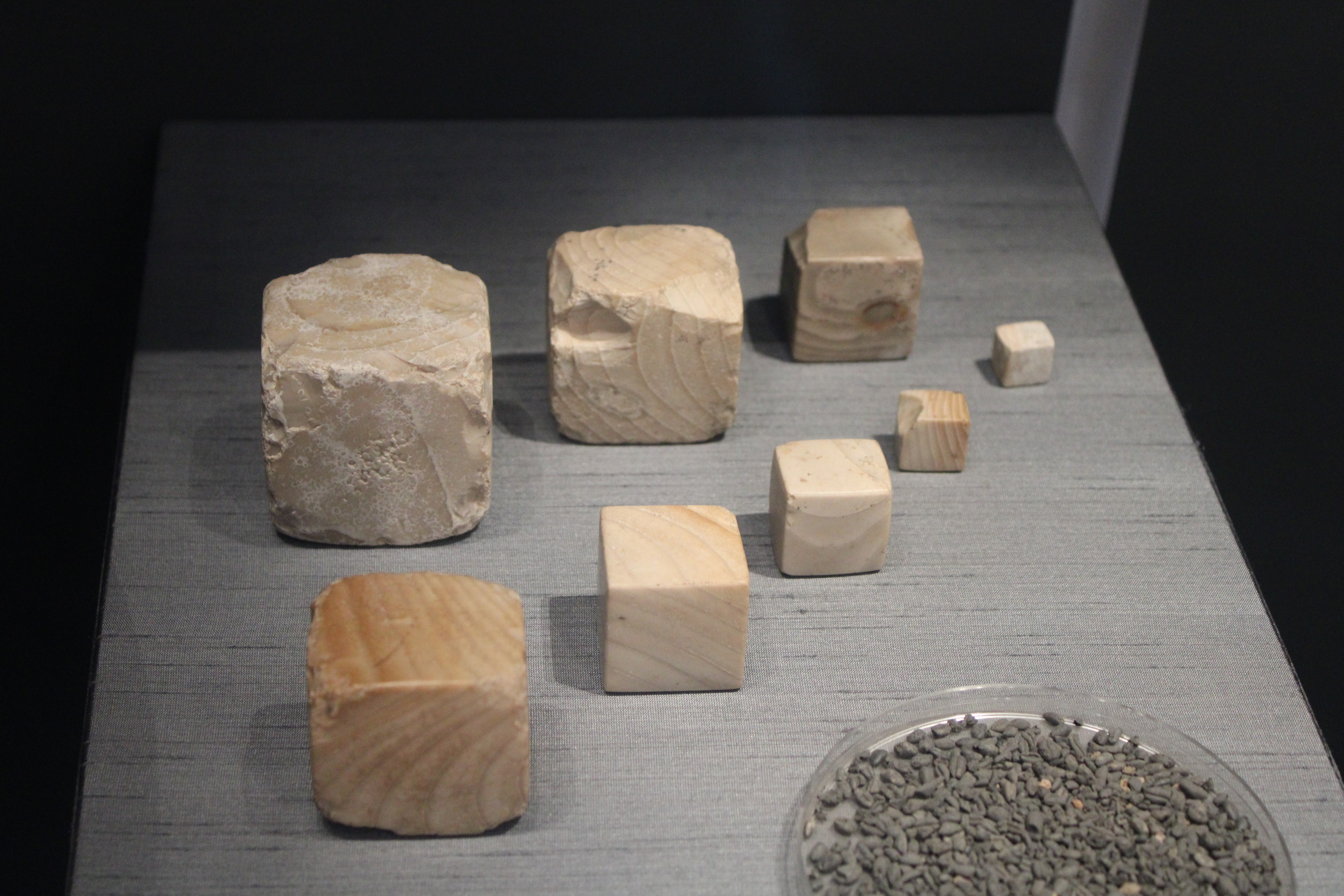
Cubical weights, standardised throughout the Indus cultural zone; 2600–1900 BC; chert; British Museum (London)

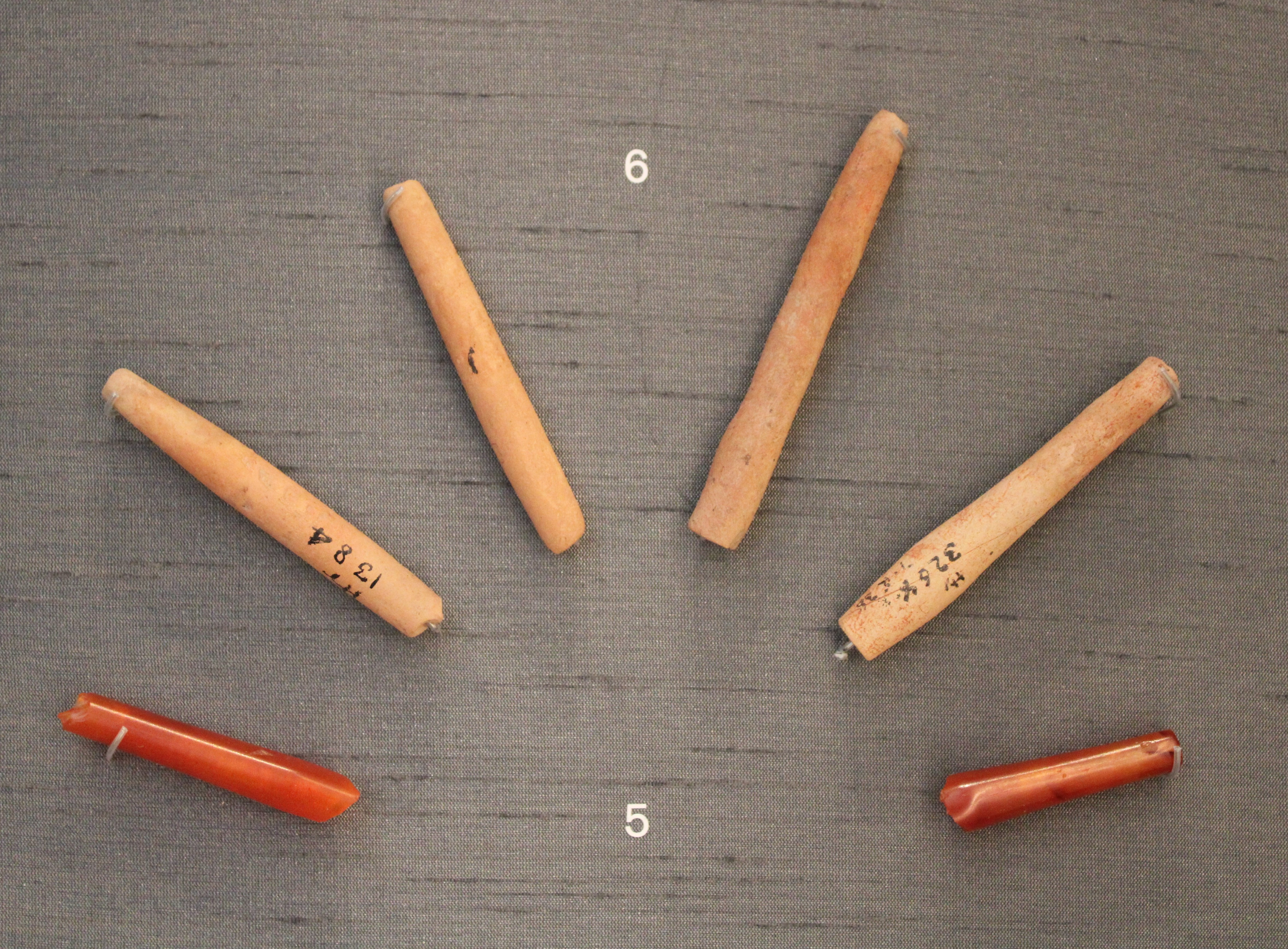
Mohenjo-daro beads; 2600–1900 BC; carnelian and terracotta; British Museum

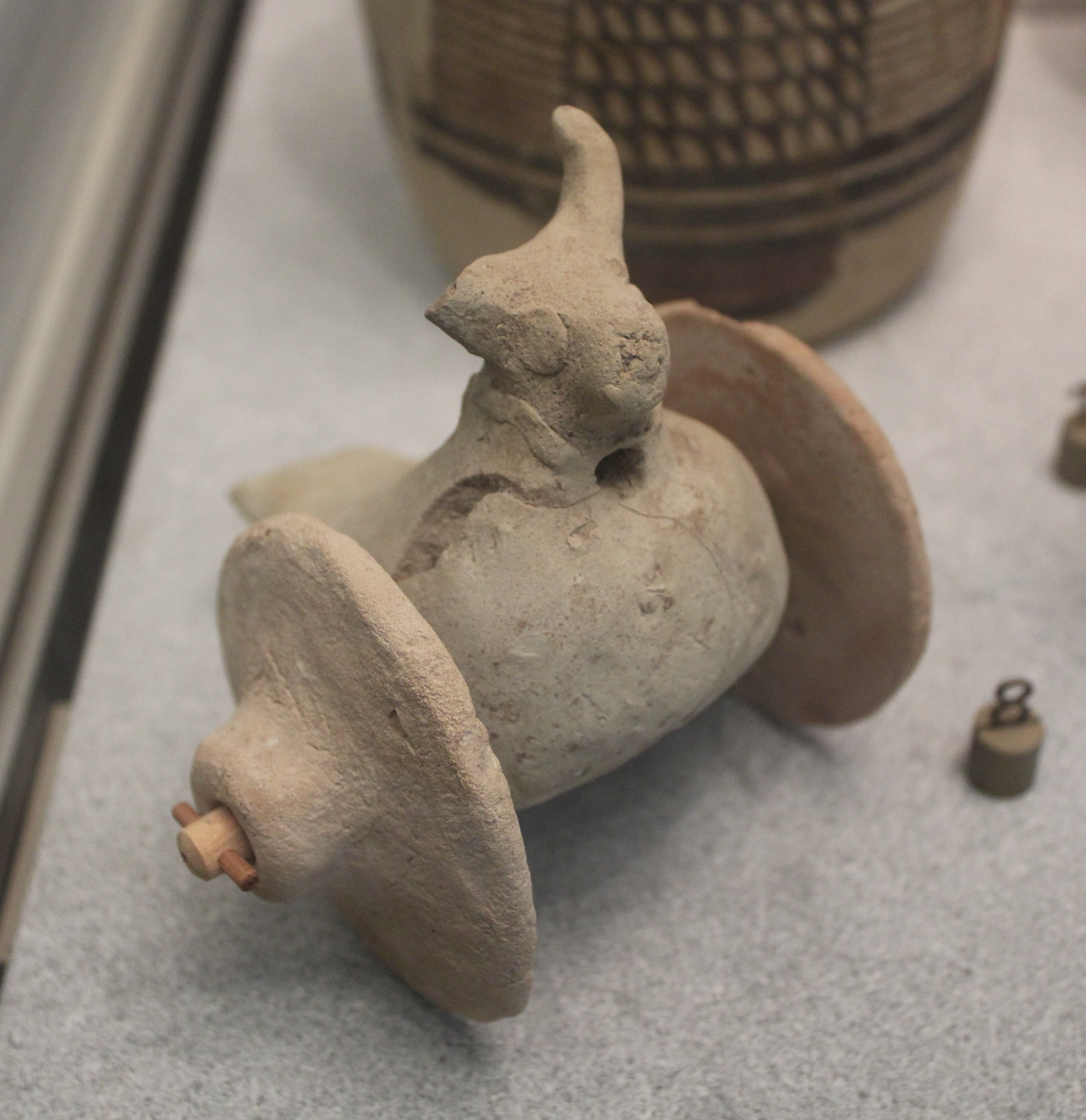
Ram-headed bird mounted on wheels, probably a toy; 2600–1900 BC; terracotta; Guimet Museum (Paris)

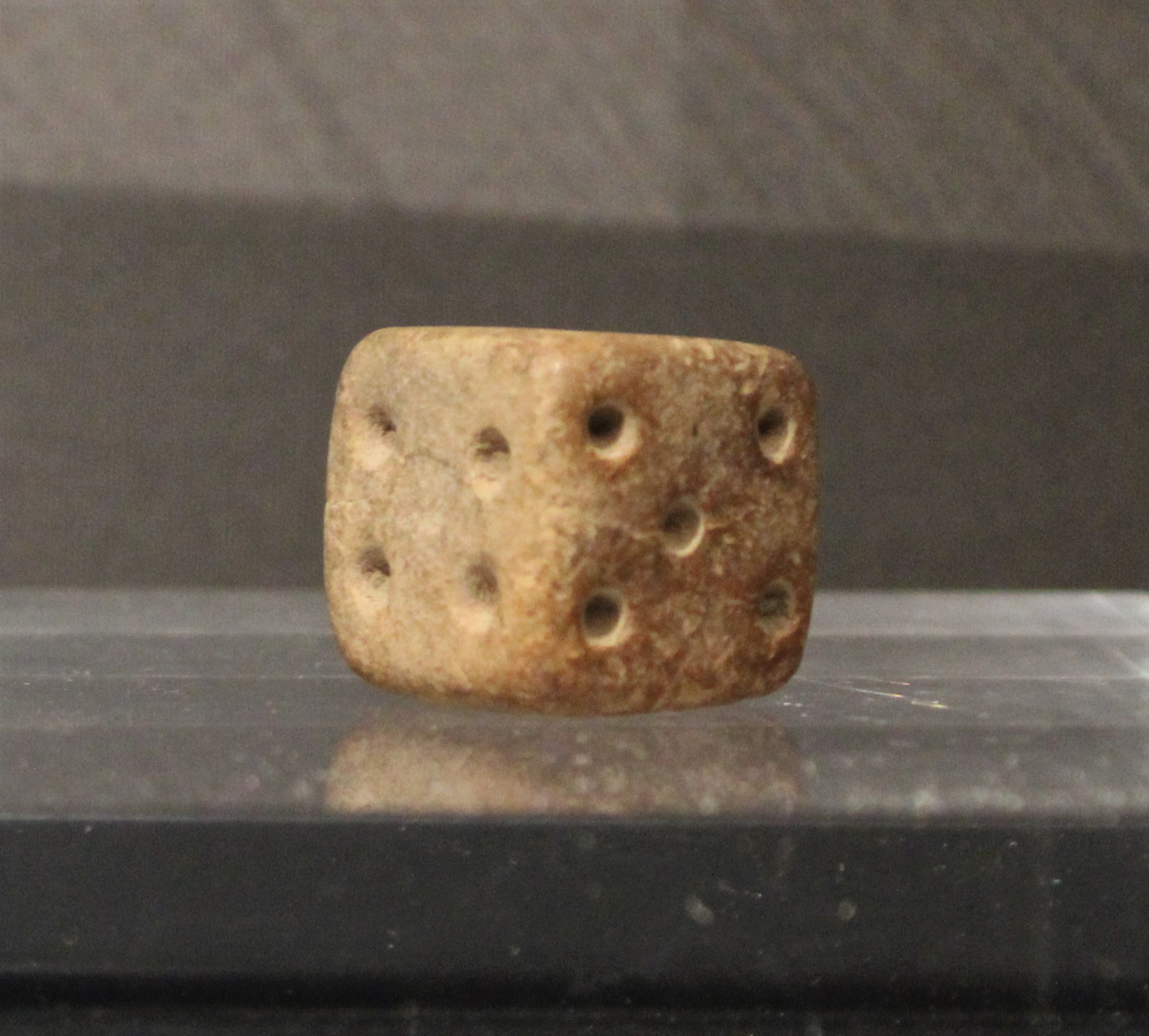
Terracotta die from Mohenjo-daro, c. 2600-1900 BCE

==== Human statuettes ====
A handful of realistic statuettes have been found at IVC sites, of which much the most famous is the lost-wax casting bronze statuette of a slender-limbed Dancing Girl adorned with bangles, found in Mohenjo-daro. Two other realistic incomplete statuettes have been found in Harappa in proper stratified excavations, which display near-Classical treatment of the human shape: the statuette of a dancer who seems to be male, and the Harappa Torso, a red jasper male torso, both now in the Delhi National Museum. Sir John Marshall reacted with surprise when he saw these two statuettes from Harappa:

When I first saw them I found it difficult to believe that they were prehistoric; they seemed to completely upset all established ideas about early art, and culture. Modelling such as this was unknown in the ancient world up to the Hellenistic age of Greece, and I thought, therefore, that some mistake must surely have been made; that these figures had found their way into levels some 3000 years older than those to which they properly belonged ... Now, in these statuettes, it is just this anatomical truth which is so startling; that makes us wonder whether, in this all-important matter, Greek artistry could possibly have been anticipated by the sculptors of a far-off age on the banks of the Indus.

These statuettes remain controversial, due to their advanced style in representing the human body. Regarding the red jasper torso, the discoverer, Vats, claims a Harappan date, but Marshall considered this statuette is probably historical, dating to the Gupta period, comparing it to the much later Lohanipur torso. A second rather similar grey stone torso of a dancing male was also found about 150 meters away in a secure Mature Harappan stratum. Overall, anthropologist Gregory Possehl tends to consider that these statuettes probably form the pinnacle of Indus art during the Mature Harappan period.

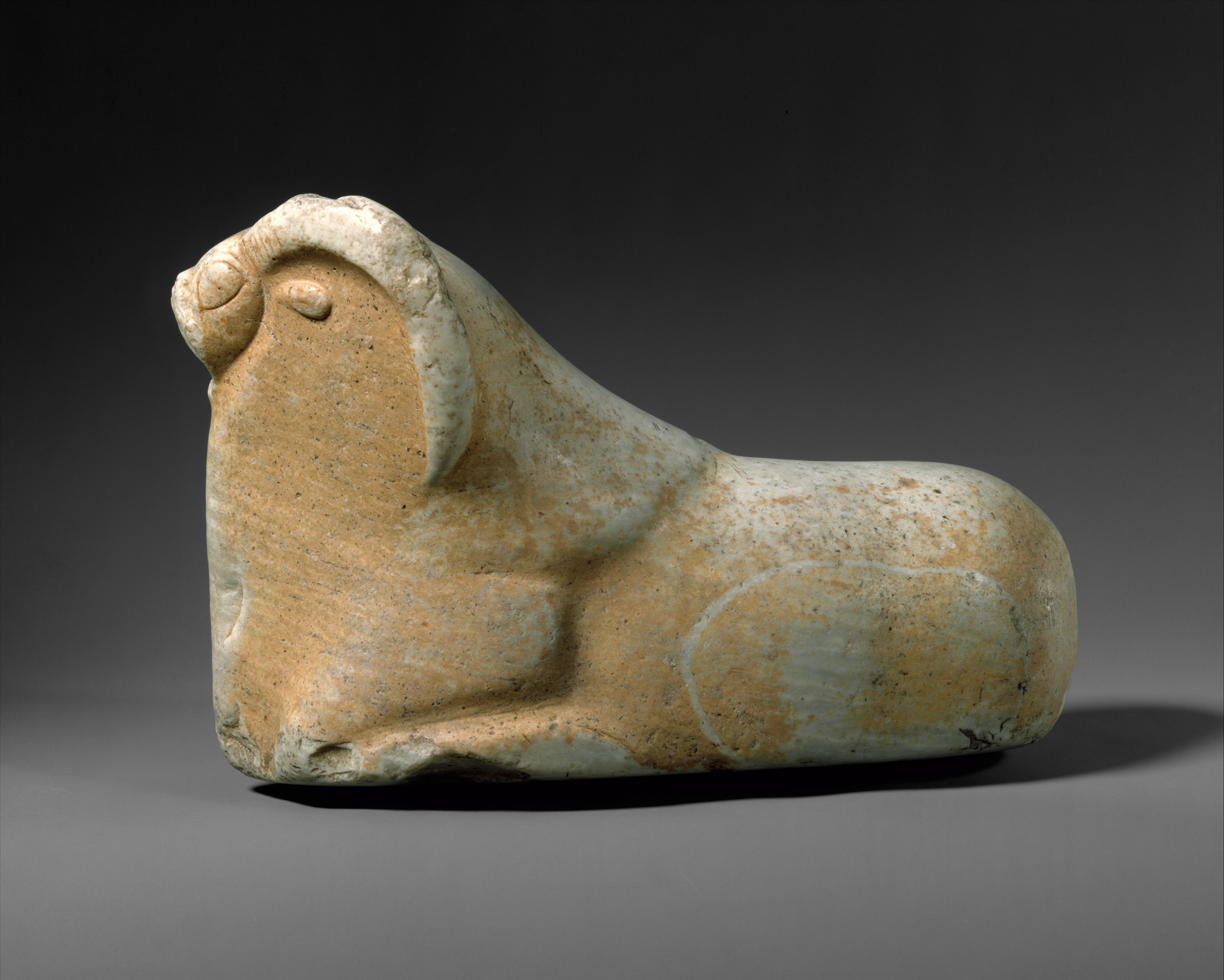
Reclining mouflon; 2600–1900 BC; marble; length: 28 cm; Metropolitan Museum of Art (New York City)

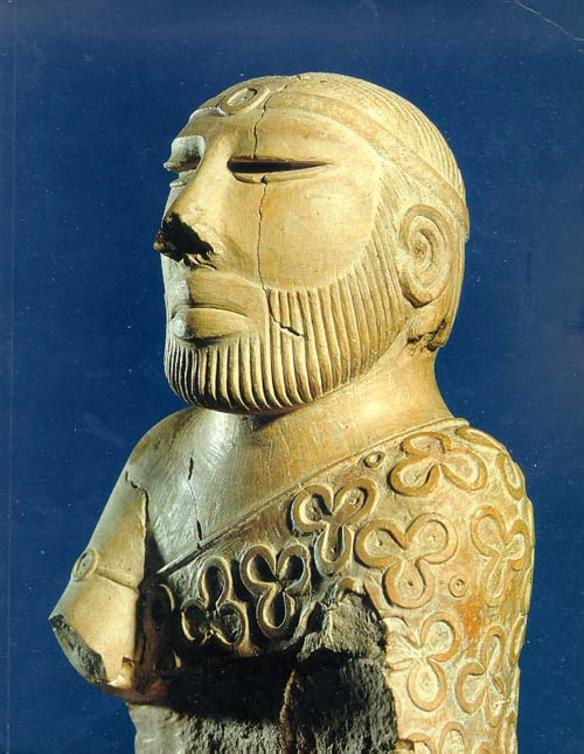
The Priest-King; 2400–1900 BC; low fired steatite; height: 17.5 cm; National Museum of Pakistan (Karachi)

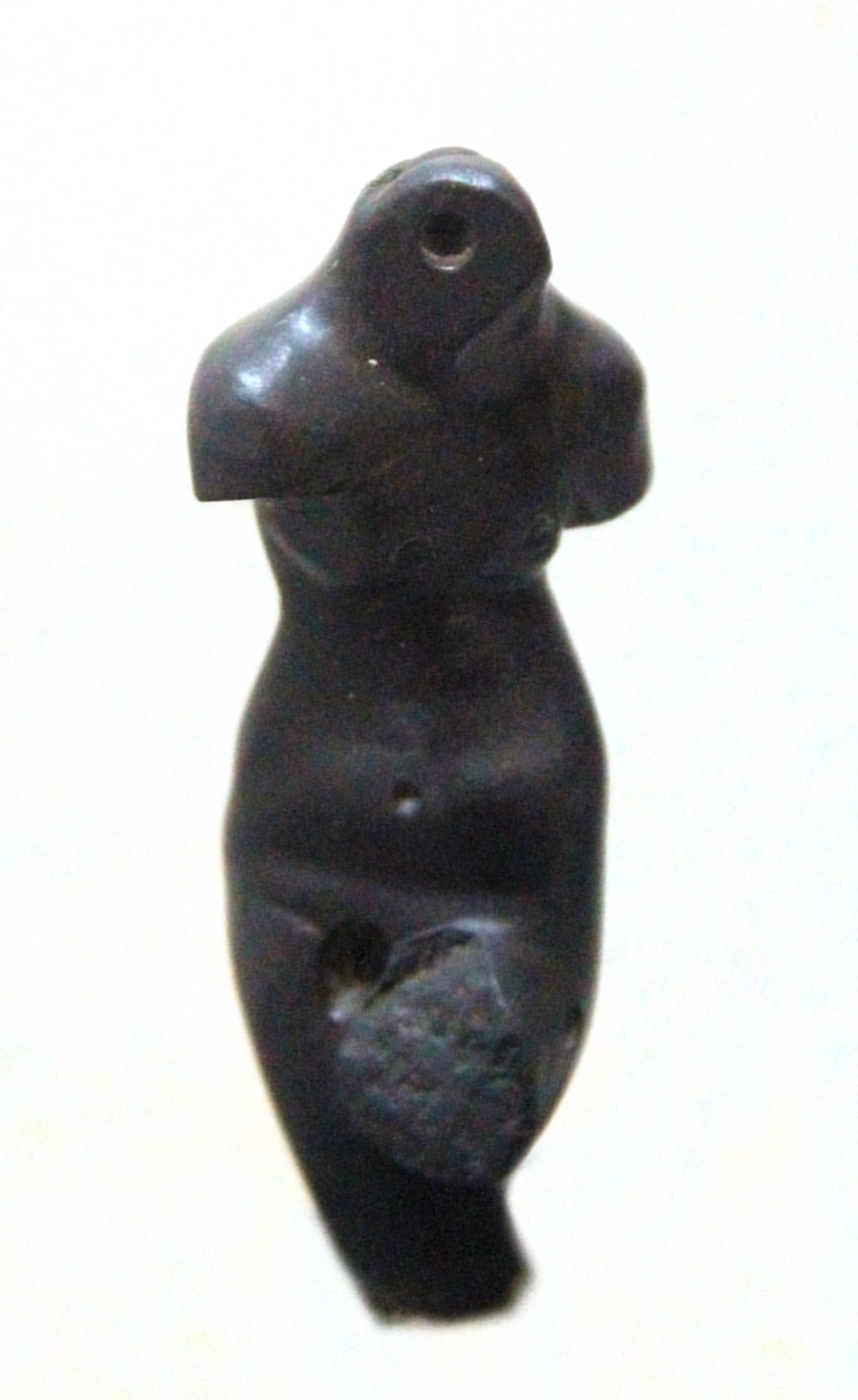
Male dancing torso; 2400–1900 BC; limestone; height: 9.9 cm; National Museum (New Delhi)

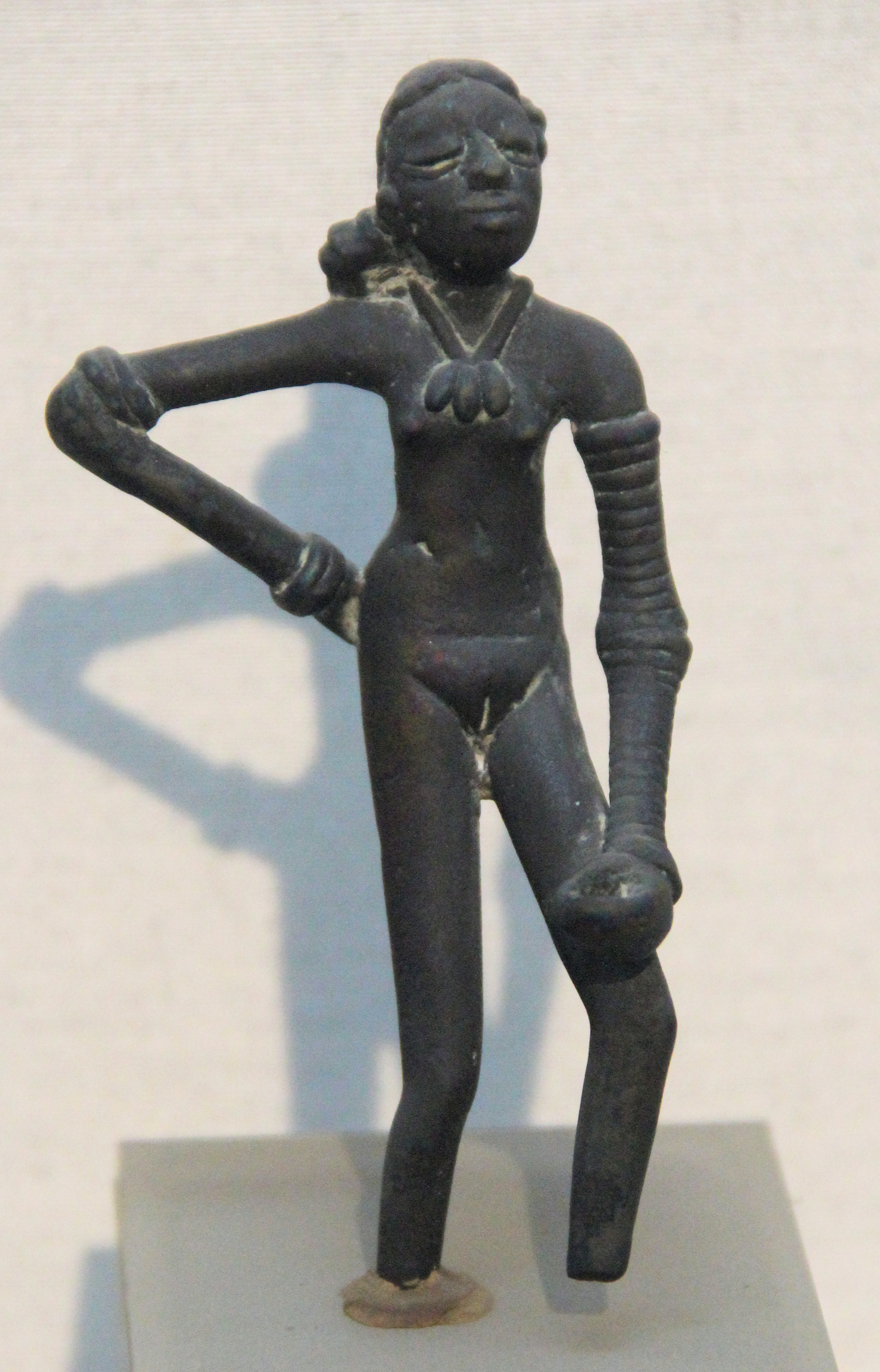
The Dancing Girl; 2400–1900 BC; bronze; height: 10.8 cm; National Museum (New Delhi)

==== Seals ====
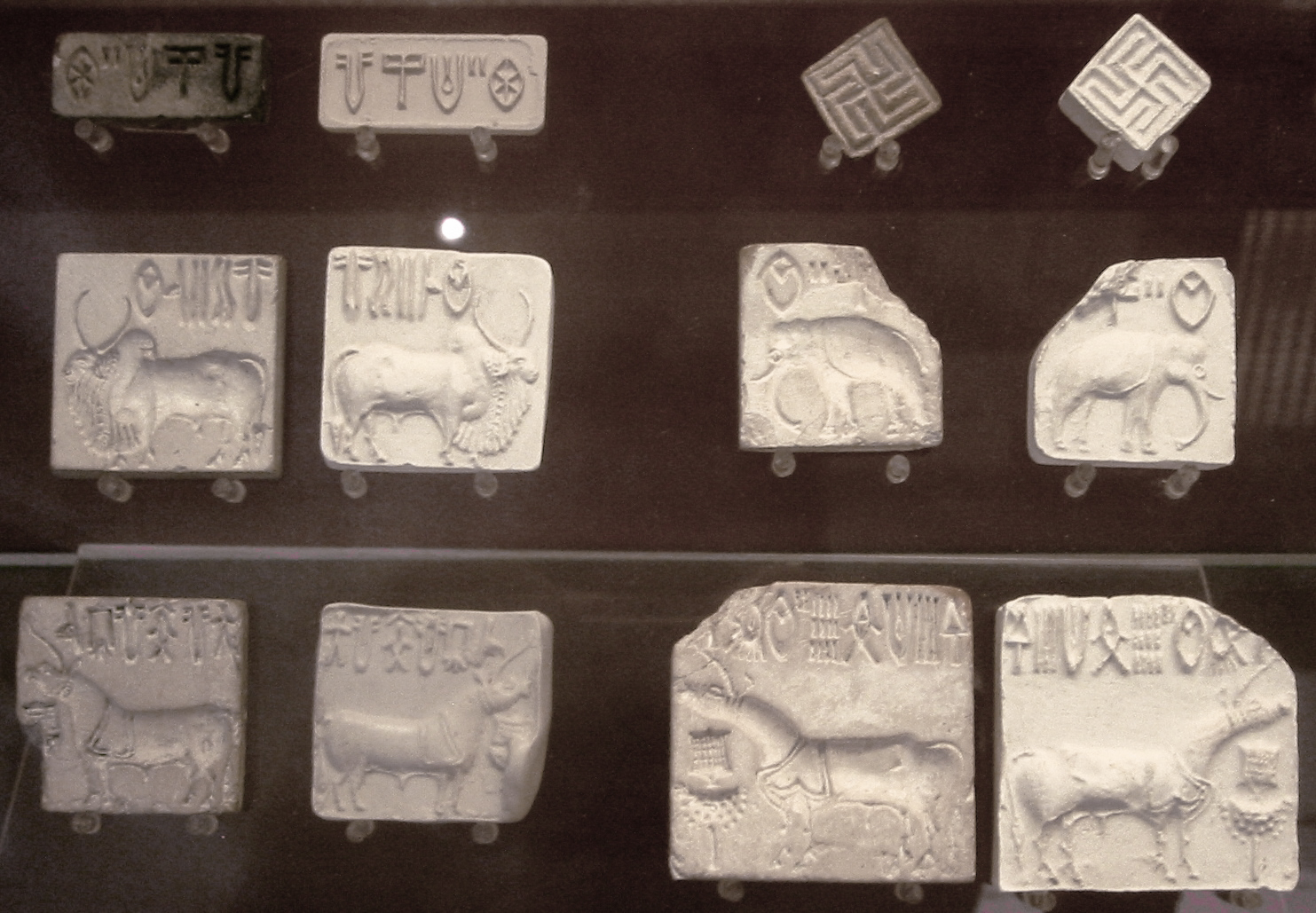
Stamp seals and (right) impressions, some of them with Indus script; probably made of steatite; British Museum (London)

Thousands of steatite seals have been recovered, and their physical character is fairly consistent. In size they range from squares of side 2 to 4 cm (3/4 to 1 1/2 in). In most cases they have a pierced boss at the back to accommodate a cord for handling or for use as personal adornment. In addition a large number of sealings have survived, of which only a few can be matched to the seals. The great majority of examples of the Indus script are short groups of signs on seals.

Seals have been found at Mohenjo-daro depicting a figure standing on its head, and another, on the Pashupati seal, sitting cross-legged in what some call a yoga-like pose (see image, the so-called Pashupati, below). This figure has been variously identified. Sir John Marshall identified a resemblance to the Hindu god, Shiva.

A human deity with the horns, hooves and tail of a bull also appears in the seals, in particular in a fighting scene with a horned tiger-like beast. This deity has been compared to the Mesopotamian bull-man Enkidu. Several seals also show a man fighting two lions or tigers, a "Master of Animals" motif common to civilisations in Western and South Asia.

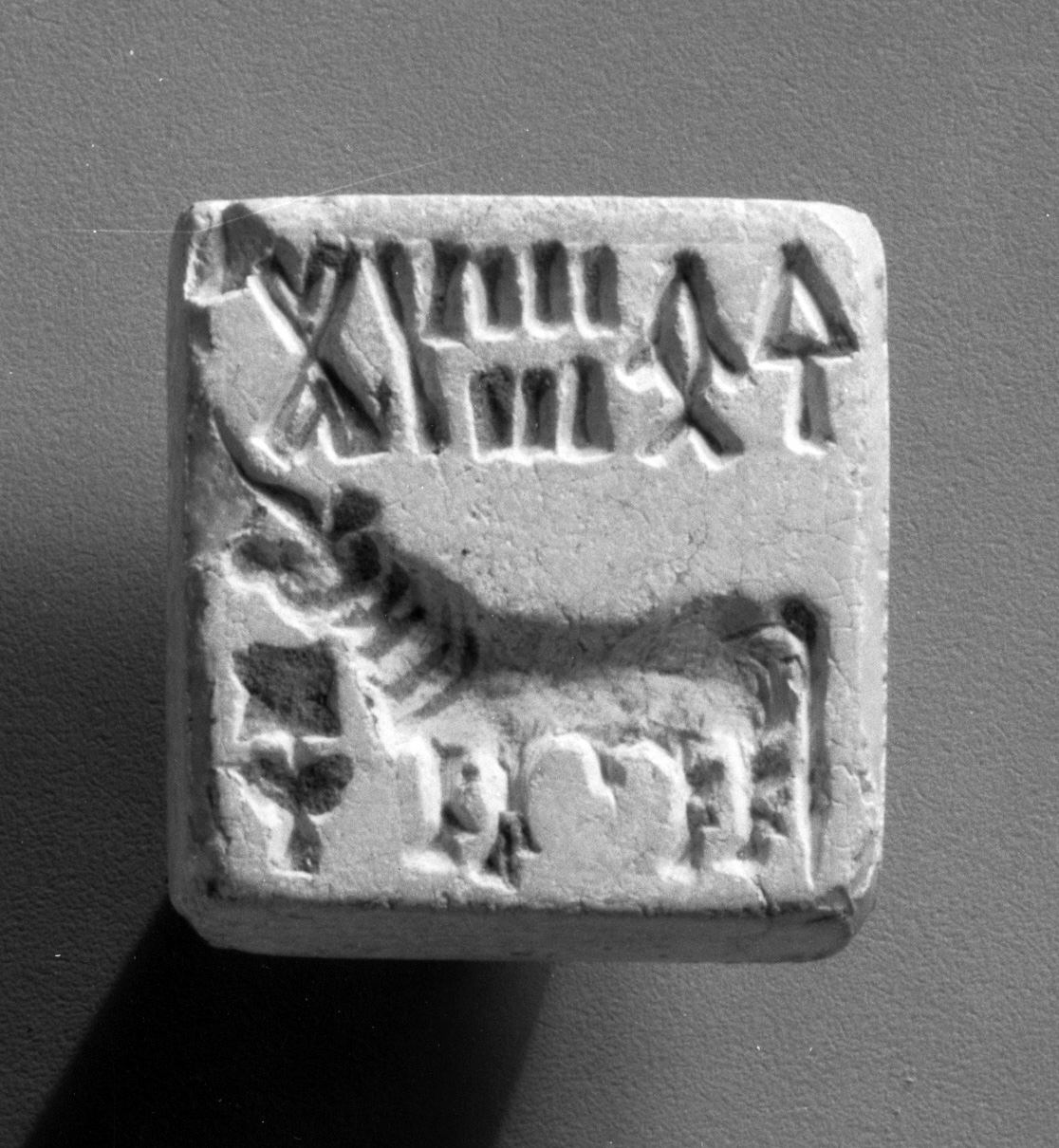
Seal; 3000–1500 BC; baked steatite; 2 × 2 cm; Metropolitan Museum of Art (New York City)

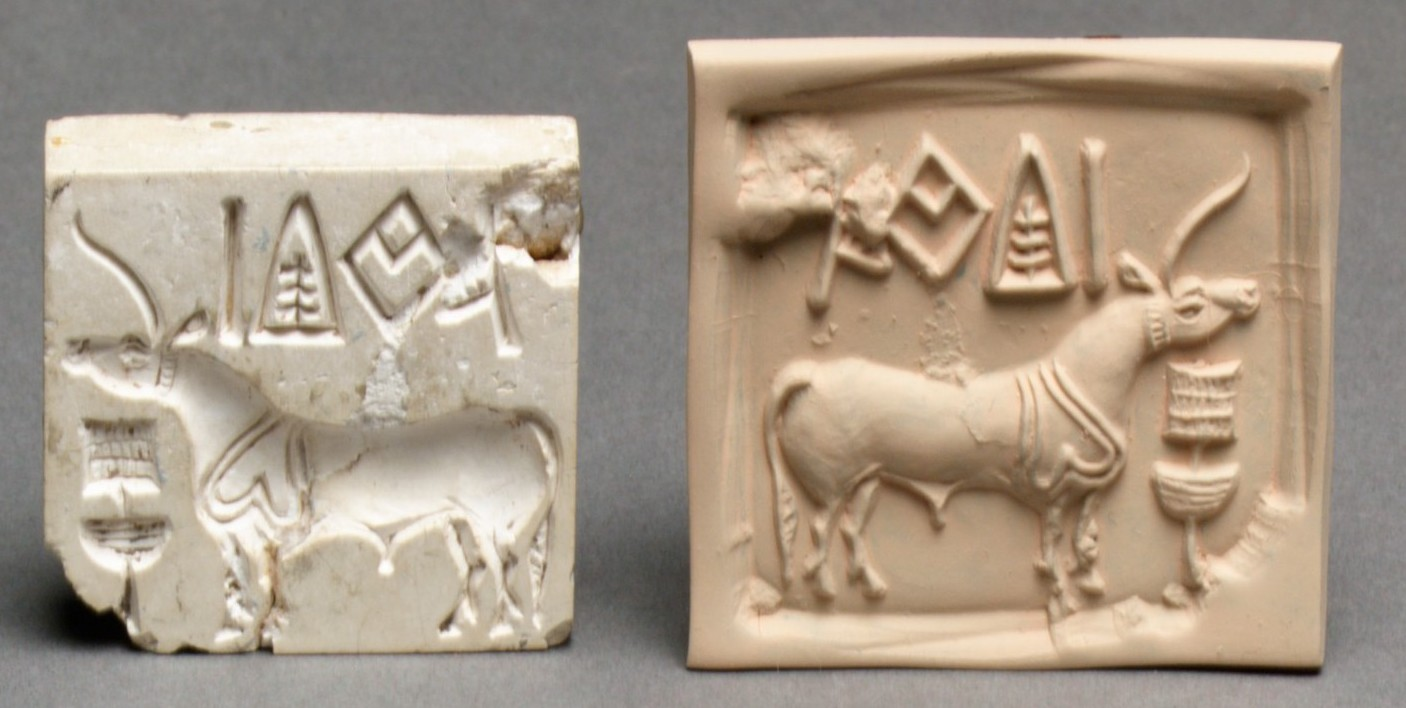
Stamp seal and modern impression: unicorn and incense burner (?); 2600–1900 BC; burnt steatite; 3.8 × 3.8 × 1 cm; Metropolitan Museum of Art

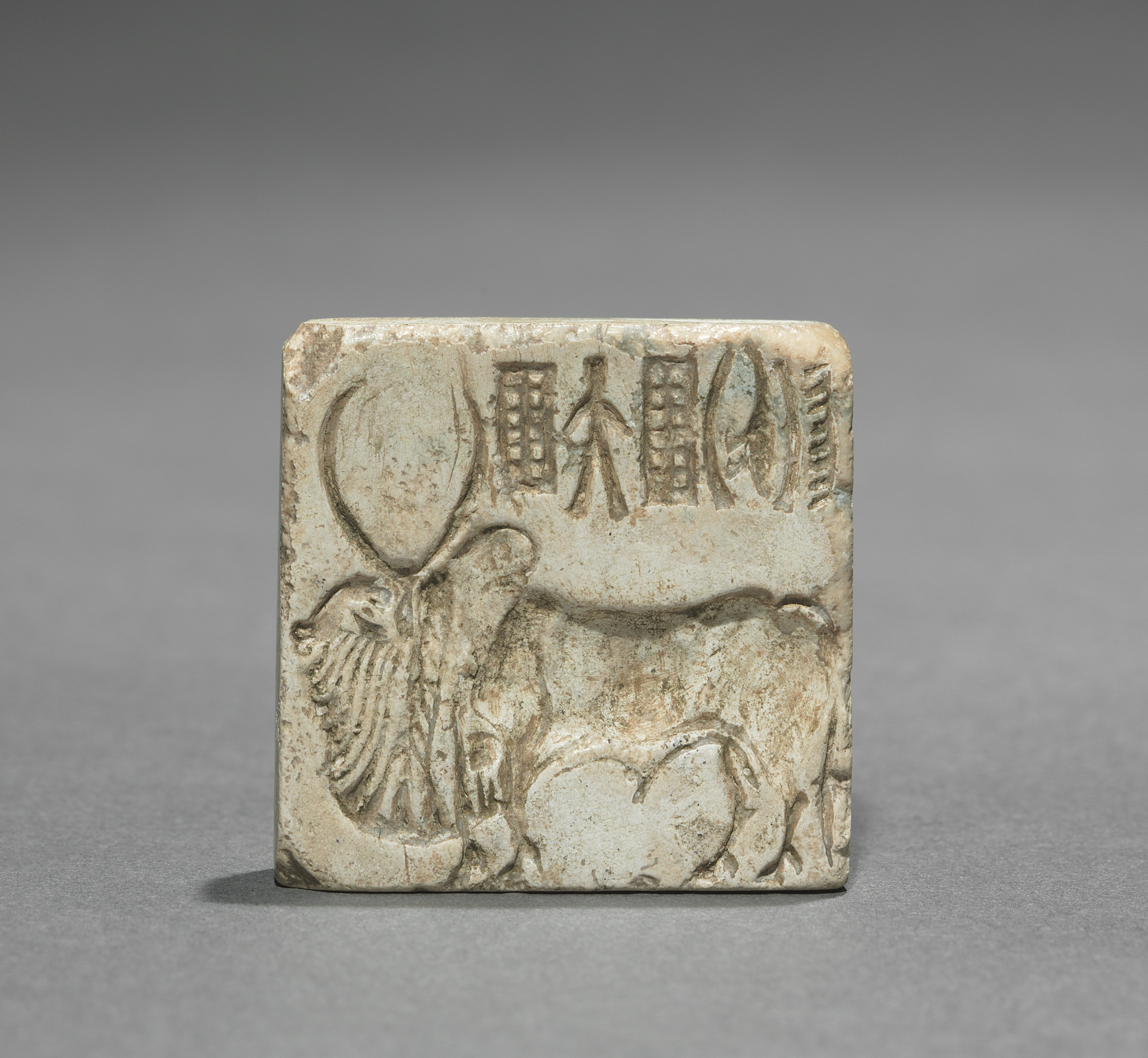
Seal with two-horned bull and inscription; 2010 BC; steatite; overall: 3.2 x 3.2 cm; Cleveland Museum of Art (Cleveland, Ohio, US)

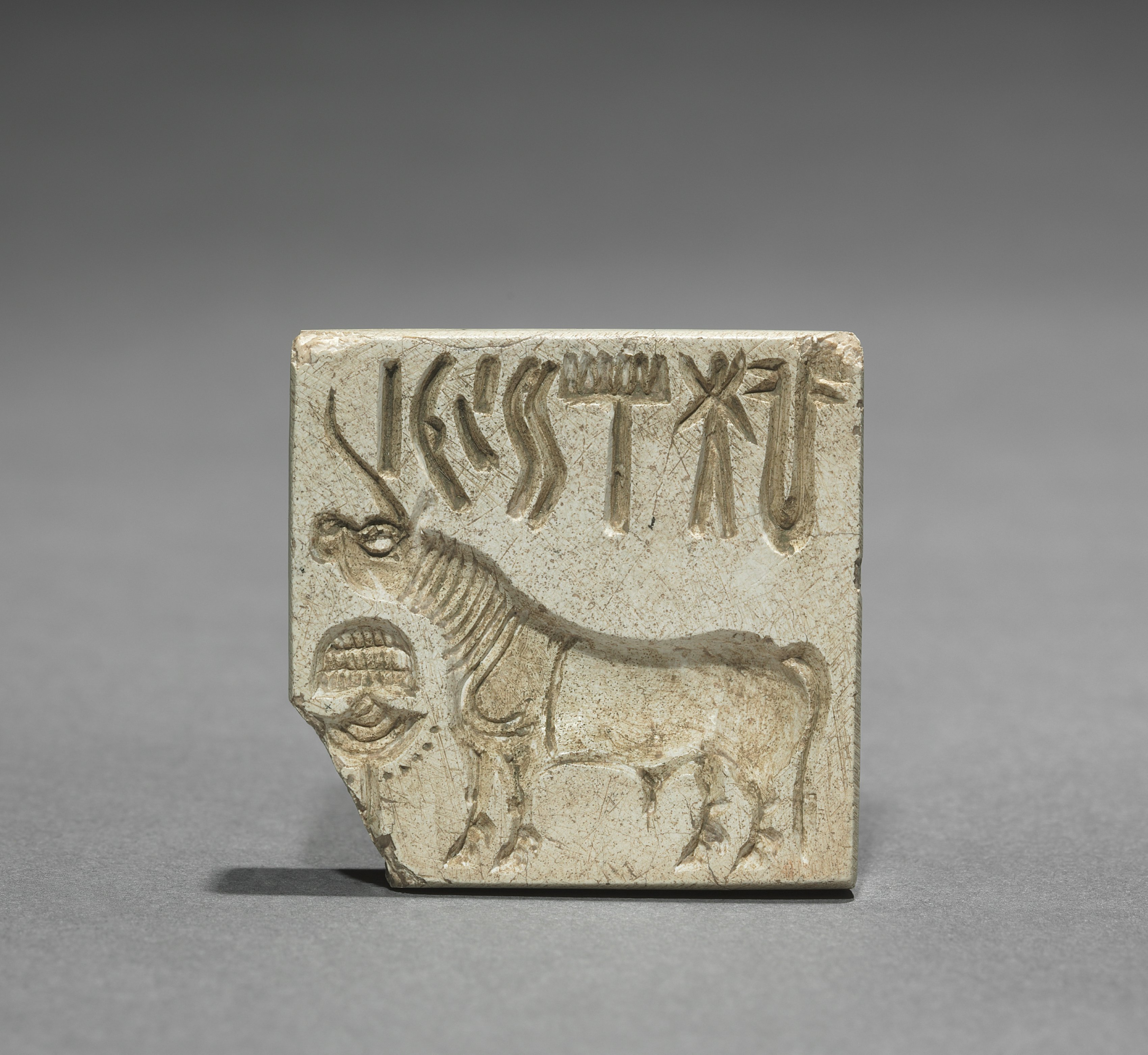
Seal with unicorn and inscription; 2010 BC; steatite; overall: 3.5 x 3.6 cm; Cleveland Museum of Art

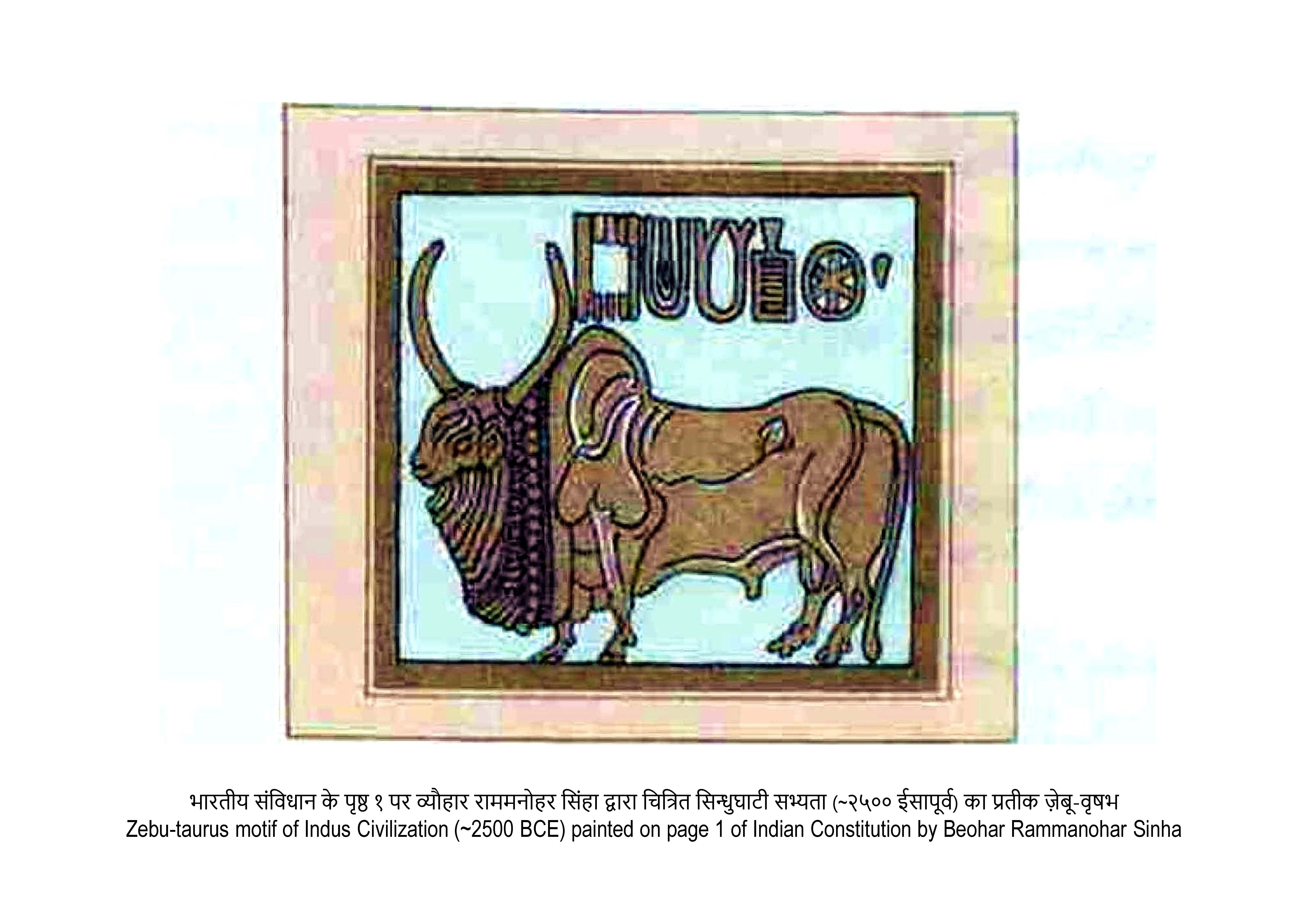
Seal painted on the first page of Constitution of India

=== Trade and transportation ===
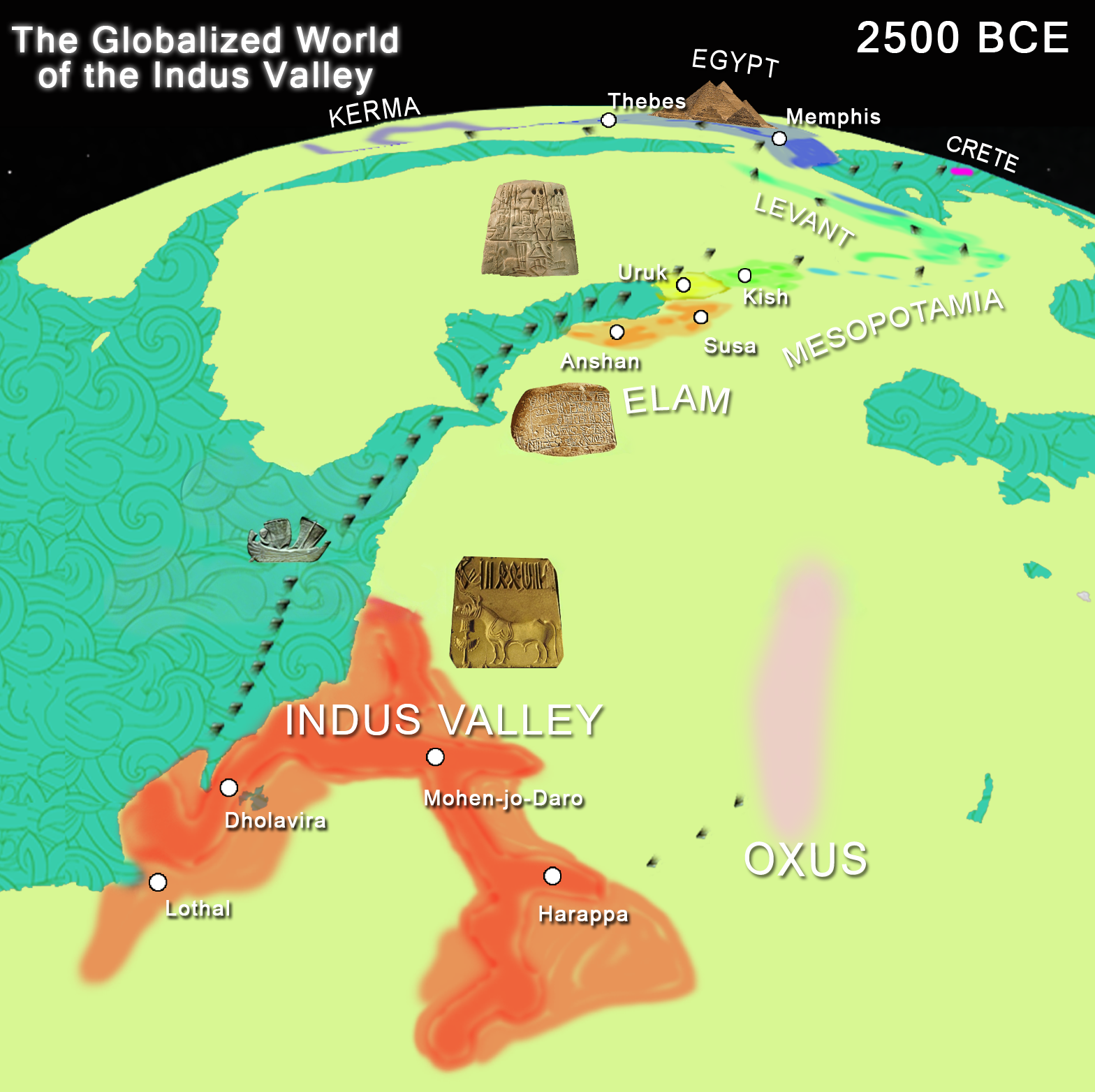
Archaeological discoveries suggest that trade routes between Mesopotamia and the Indus were active during the 3rd millennium BCE, leading to the development of Indus–Mesopotamia relations.

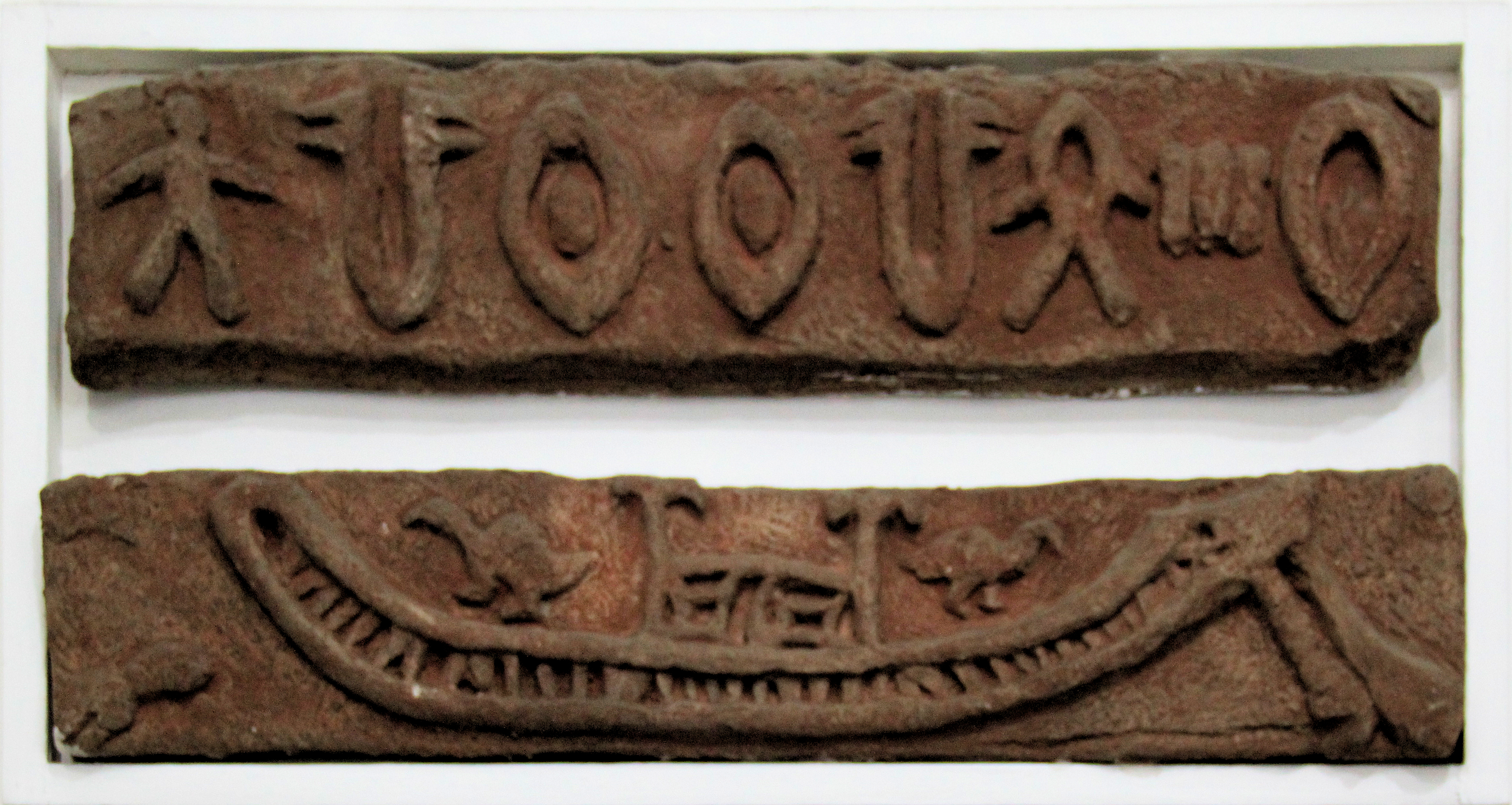
Boat with direction-finding birds to find land. Model of Mohenjo-daro tablet, 2500–1750 BCE.(National Museum, New Delhi). Flat-bottomed river row-boats appear in two Indus seals, but their seaworthiness is debatable.

The Indus Valley Civilisation may have had bullock carts identical to those seen throughout South Asia today, as well as boats. Most of these boats were probably small, flat-bottomed craft, perhaps driven by sail, similar to those one can see on the Indus River today. An extensive canal network, used for irrigation, has however also been discovered by H.-P. Francfort.

During 4300–3200 BCE of the chalcolithic period (copper age), the Indus Valley Civilisation area shows ceramic similarities with southern Turkmenistan and northern Iran which suggest considerable mobility and trade. During the Early Harappan period (about 3200–2600 BCE), similarities in pottery, seals, figurines, ornaments, etc. document intensive caravan trade with Central Asia and the Iranian plateau.

Judging from the dispersal of Indus Valley Civilisation artefacts, the trade networks economically integrated a huge area, including portions of Afghanistan, the coastal regions of Persia connected by the Gulf of Oman from the Arabian Sea, northern and western India, and Mesopotamia, leading to the development of Indus-Mesopotamia relations. Studies of tooth enamel from individuals buried at Harappa suggest that some residents had migrated to the city from beyond the Indus Valley. Ancient DNA studies of graves at Bronze Age sites at Gonur Depe, Turkmenistan, and Shahr-e Sukhteh, Iran, have identified 11 individuals of South Asian descent, who are presumed to be of mature Indus Valley origin.

There was an extensive maritime trade network operating between the Harappan and Mesopotamian civilisations as early as the middle Harappan Phase, with much commerce being handled by "middlemen merchants from Dilmun" (modern Bahrain, Eastern Arabia and Failaka located in the Persian Gulf). Such long-distance sea trade became feasible with the development of plank-built watercraft, equipped with a single central mast supporting a sail of woven rushes or cloth.

However, the evidence of sea-borne trade involving the Harappan civilisation is not firm. In their book Rise of Civilization in India and Pakistan archaeologists Bridget Allchin and Raymond Allchin write:

... (p. 173) the settlement at Lothal ... along the east side was a brick basin. It is claimed by its excavator to have been a dockyard, connected by channels to a neighbouring estuary. ... On its edge the excavator discovered several heavily-pierced stones, similar to modern anchor stones employed by traditional seafaring communities of Western India. This interpretation, however, has been challenged, and indeed the published levels of the basin and its entrance relative to the modern sea level seem to argue against it. Leshnik has cogently suggested that it was a tank for the reception of sweet water, channelled from higher ground inland to an area where the local water supplies were anciently, as still today, saline. We regard either interpretation as still unproven, but favour the latter. ... (p. 188–189) The discussion of trade focuses attention upon methods of transport. Several representations of ships are found on seals and graffiti at Harappa, Mohenjo-daro (Figs. 7.15–7.16], etc, and a terracotta model of a ship, with a stick impressed socket for the mast and eyeholes for fixing rigging comes from Lothal. We have already seen above that the great brick tank, interpreted by Rao as a dock at Lothal, cannot yet be certainly identified. The evidence of sea trade and contact during the Harappan period is largely circumstantial, or derived from inferences from the Mesopotamian texts, as detailed above. (Figure 7. 15 had caption: Mohenjo-daro: representation of ship on a stone seal (length 4.3 cm) (after Mackay). Figure 7.16 Mohenjo-daro: representation of ship on terracotta amulet (length 4.5 cm) after Dales)

Daniel T. Potts writes:

It is generally assumed that most trade between the Indus Valley (ancient Meluhha?) and western neighbors proceeded up the Persian Gulf rather than overland. Although there is no incontrovertible proof that this was indeed the case, the distribution of Indus-type artifacts on the Oman peninsula, on Bahrain and in southern Mesopotamia makes it plausible that a series of maritime stages linked the Indus Valley and the Gulf region. If this is accepted, then the presence of etched carnelian beads, a Harappan-style cubical stone weight, and a Harappan-style cylinder seal at Susa (Amiet 1986a, Figs. 92-94) may be evidence of maritime trade between Susa and the Indus Valley in the late 3rd millennium BCE. On the other hand, given that similar finds, particularly etched carnelian beads, are attested at landlocked sites including Tepe Hissar (Tappe Heṣār), Shah Tepe (Šāh-Tappe), Kalleh Nisar (Kalla Nisār), Jalalabad (Jalālābād), Marlik (Mārlik) and Tepe Yahya (Tappe Yaḥyā) (Possehl 1996, pp. 153-54), other mechanisms, including overland traffic by peddlers or caravans, may account for their presence at Susa.

In the 1980s, important archaeological discoveries were made at Ras al-Jinz (Oman), demonstrating maritime Indus Valley connections with the Arabian Peninsula.

Dennys Frenez recently regards that:

Indus-type and Indus-related artifacts were found over a large and differentiated ecumene, encompassing Central Asia, the Iranian Plateau, Mesopotamia and the northern Levant, the Persian Gulf, and the Oman Peninsula. The discovery of Indus trade tools (seals, weights, and containers) across the entire Middle Asia, complemented by information from Mesopotamian cuneiform texts, shows that entrepreneurs from the Indus Valley regularly ventured into these regions to transact with the local socioeconomic and political entities. However, Indus artifacts were also exchanged beyond this core region, eventually reaching as far [as] the Nile River valley, Anatolia, and the Caucasus. On the contrary, only a handful of exotic trade tools and commodities have been found at sites in the Greater Indus Valley. The success of Indus trade in Central and Western Asia did not only rely on the dynamic entrepreneurialism of Indus merchants and the exotic commodities they offered. Specific products were proactively designed and manufactured in the Indus Valley to fulfill the particular needs of foreign markets, and Indus craftspeople moved beyond their native cultural sphere adapting their distinctive productions to the taste of foreign elites or reworking indigenous models. The adoption of specific seals and iconographies to regulate external trade activities suggests a conscious attempt at implementing a coordinated supraregional marketing strategy[...]

=== Agriculture ===
According to Gangal et al. (2014), there is strong archaeological and geographical evidence that neolithic farming spread from the Near East into north-west India, but there is also "good evidence for the local domestication of barley and the zebu cattle at Mehrgarh." (Note: Gangal refers to Jarrige (2008a) and Costantini (2008))

According to Jean-Francois Jarrige, farming had an independent local origin at Mehrgarh, which he argues is not merely a "'backwater' of the Neolithic culture of the Near East", despite similarities between Neolithic sites from eastern Mesopotamia and the western Indus valley which are evidence of a "cultural continuum" between those sites. Archaeologist Jim G. Shaffer writes that the Mehrgarh site "demonstrates that food production was an indigenous South Asian phenomenon" and that the data support interpretation of "the prehistoric urbanisation and complex social organisation in South Asia as based on indigenous, but not isolated, cultural developments".

Jarrige notes that the people of Mehrgarh used domesticated wheats and barley, while Shaffer and Liechtenstein note that the major cultivated cereal crop was naked six-row barley, a crop derived from two-row barley. Gangal agrees that "Neolithic domesticated crops in Mehrgarh include more than 90% barley," noting that "there is good evidence for the local domestication of barley." Yet, Gangal also notes that the crop also included "a small amount of wheat," which "are suggested to be of Near-Eastern origin, as the modern distribution of wild varieties of wheat is limited to Northern Levant and Southern Turkey." (Note: Gangal refers to Fuller (2006))

The cattle that are often portrayed on Indus seals are humped Indian aurochs (Bos primigenius namadicus), which are similar to Zebu cattle. Zebu cattle are still common in India, and in Africa. They are different from European cattle (Bos primigenius taurus), and are believed to have been independently domesticated on the Indian subcontinent, probably in the Baluchistan region of Pakistan.

Research by J. Bates et al. (2016) confirms that Indus populations were the earliest people to use complex multi-cropping strategies across both seasons, growing foods during summer (rice, millets and beans) and winter (wheat, barley and pulses), which required different watering regimes. Bates et al. (2016) also found evidence for an entirely separate domestication process of rice in ancient South Asia, based around the wild species Oryza nivara. This led to the local development of a mix of "wetland" and "dryland" agriculture of local Oryza sativa indica rice agriculture, before the truly "wetland" rice Oryza sativa japonica arrived around 2000 BCE.

=== Food ===
According to archaeological finds, the Indus Valley Civilisation had a diet dominated by meats of animals such as cattle, buffalo, goat, pig and chicken. Remnants of dairy products were also discovered. According to Akshyeta Suryanarayan et al., (Note: A large proportion of data however remains ambiguous. Reliable local isotopic references for fats and oils are unavailable, and lipid levels in IVC vessels are quite low.) available evidence indicates culinary practices to be common over the region; food-constituents were dairy products (in low proportion), ruminant carcass meat, and either non-ruminant adipose fats, plants, or mixtures of these products. The dietary pattern remained the same throughout the decline.

Seven food-balls ("laddus") were found in intact form, along with two figurines of bulls and a hand-held copper adze, during excavations in 2017 from western Rajasthan. Dated to about 2600 BCE, they were likely composed of legumes, primarily mung, and cereals. The authors speculated the food-balls to be of a ritualistic significance, given the finds of bull figurines, adze and a seal in immediate vicinity.

=== Language ===
The Harappan language is the unknown language (or languages) of the Indus Valley Civilisation. The Harappan script is yet undeciphered, indeed it has not even been demonstrated to be a writing system, and therefore the language remains unknown. The language being yet unattested in readable contemporary sources, hypotheses regarding its nature are based on possible loanwords, the substratum in Vedic Sanskrit, and some terms recorded in Sumerian cuneiform (such as Meluhha), in conjunction with analyses of the Harappan script.

There are some possible loanwords from the language of the Indus Valley Civilisation. Meluḫḫa or Melukhkha (Sumerian: 𒈨𒈛𒄩𒆠 Me-luḫ-ḫa^{KI}) is the Sumerian name of a prominent trading partner of Sumer during the Middle Bronze Age. Its identification remains an open question, but most scholars associate it with the Indus Valley Civilisation. Of the substratum in Vedic Sanskrit, the bulk have no proven basis in any of the known families, suggesting a source in one or more lost languages. One of these lost languages could have been the Harappan language, which Witzel labelled as the Kubhā-Vipāś substrate.

One hypothesis has been suggested that the bearers of the IVC corresponded to proto-Dravidians linguistically, the break-up of proto-Dravidian corresponding to the break-up of the Late Harappan culture. Finnish Indologist Asko Parpola concludes that the uniformity of the Indus inscriptions precludes any possibility of widely different languages being used, and that an early form of Dravidian language must have been the language of the Indus people. Today, the Dravidian language family is concentrated mostly in southern India and northern and eastern Sri Lanka, but pockets of it still remain throughout the rest of India and Pakistan (the Brahui language), which lends credence to the theory.

=== Possible writing system ===
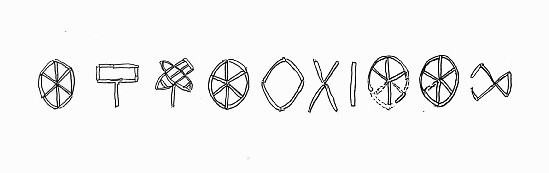
Ten Indus characters from the northern gate of Dholavira, dubbed the Dholavira signboard

Between 400 and as many as 600 distinct Indus symbols have been found on stamp seals, small tablets, ceramic pots and more than a dozen other materials, including a "signboard" that apparently once hung over the gate of the inner citadel of the Indus city of Dholavira. Typical Indus inscriptions are around five characters in length, most of which (aside from the Dholavira "signboard") are tiny; the longest on any single object (inscribed on a copper plate) has a length of 34 symbols.

While the Indus Valley Civilisation is generally characterised as a literate society on the evidence of these inscriptions, this description has been challenged by Farmer, Sproat, and Witzel (2004) who argue that the Indus system did not encode language, but was instead similar to a variety of non-linguistic sign systems used extensively in the Near East and other societies, to symbolise families, clans, gods, and religious concepts. Others have claimed on occasion that the symbols were exclusively used for economic transactions, but this claim leaves unexplained the appearance of Indus symbols on many ritual objects, many of which were mass-produced in moulds. No parallels to these mass-produced inscriptions are known in any other early ancient civilisations.

In a 2009 study by P.N. Rao et al. published in Science, computer scientists, comparing the pattern of symbols to various linguistic scripts and non-linguistic systems, including DNA and a computer programming language, found that the Indus script's pattern is closer to that of spoken words, supporting the hypothesis that it codes for an as-yet-unknown language.

Farmer, Sproat, and Witzel have disputed this finding, pointing out that Rao et al. did not actually compare the Indus signs with "real-world non-linguistic systems" but rather with "two wholly artificial systems invented by the authors, one consisting of 200,000 randomly ordered signs and another of 200,000 fully ordered signs, that they spuriously claim represent the structures of all real-world non-linguistic sign systems". Farmer et al. have also demonstrated that a comparison of a non-linguistic system like medieval heraldic signs with natural languages yields results similar to those that Rao et al. obtained with Indus signs. They conclude that the method used by Rao et al. cannot distinguish linguistic systems from non-linguistic ones.

The messages on the seals have proved to be too short to be decoded by a computer. Each seal has a distinctive combination of symbols and there are too few examples of each sequence to provide a sufficient context. The symbols that accompany the images vary from seal to seal, making it impossible to derive a meaning for the symbols from the images. There have, nonetheless, been a number of interpretations offered for the meaning of the seals. These interpretations have been marked by ambiguity and subjectivity.

Photos of many of the thousands of extant inscriptions are published in the Corpus of Indus Seals and Inscriptions (1987, 1991, 2010), edited by Asko Parpola and his colleagues. The most recent volume republished photos taken in the 1920s and 1930s of hundreds of lost or stolen inscriptions, along with many discovered in the last few decades; formerly, researchers had to supplement the materials in the Corpus by study of the tiny photos in the excavation reports of Marshall (1931), MacKay (1938, 1943), Wheeler (1947), or reproductions in more recent scattered sources.

=== Religion ===
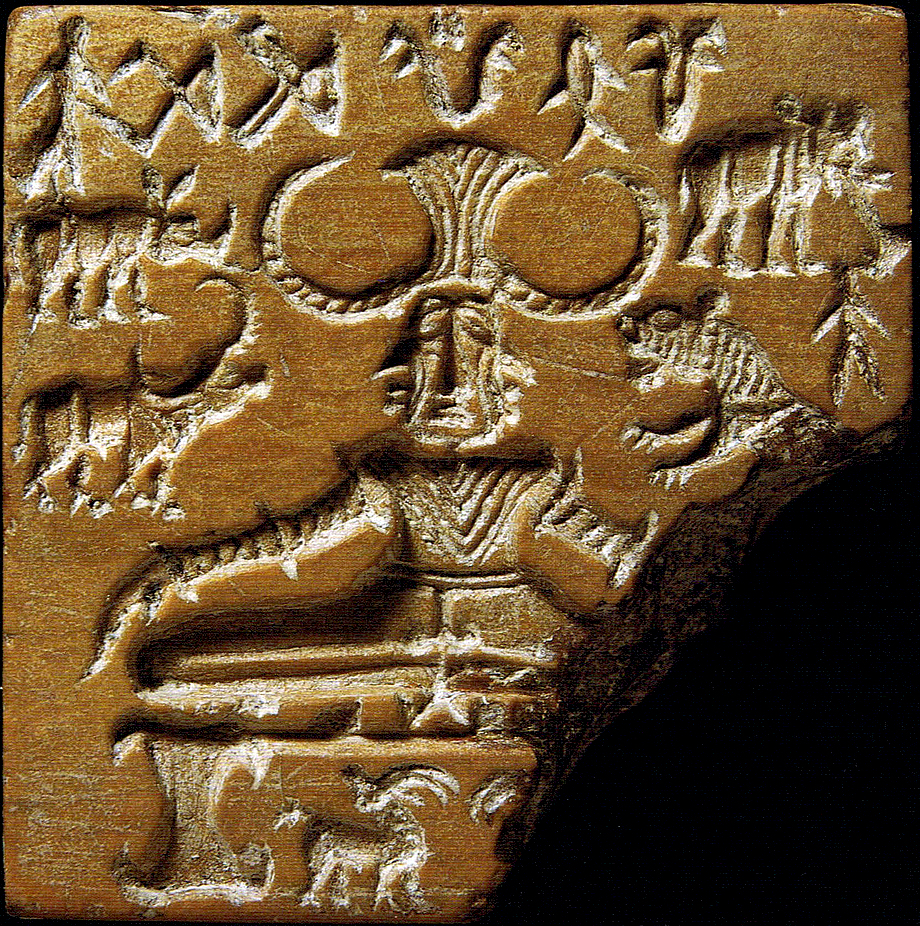
The Pashupati seal, showing a seated figure surrounded by animals

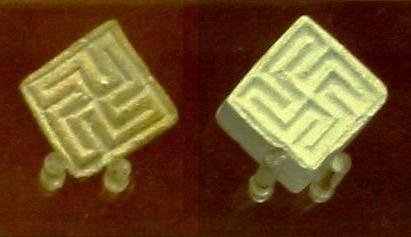
Swastika seals of Indus Valley Civilisation in British Museum

The religion and belief system of the Indus Valley people has received considerable attention, especially from the view of identifying precursors to deities and religious practices of Indian religions that later developed in the area. However, due to the sparsity of evidence, which is open to varying interpretations, and the fact that the Indus script remains undeciphered, the conclusions are partly speculative and largely based on a retrospective view from a much later Hindu perspective.

Early and influential work in the area that set the trend for Hindu interpretations of archaeological evidence from the Harappan sites was that of John Marshall, who in 1931 identified the following as prominent features of the Indus religion: a Great Male God and a Mother Goddess; deification or veneration of animals and plants; a symbolic representation of the phallus (linga) and vulva (yoni); and, use of baths and water in religious practice. Marshall's interpretations have been much debated, and sometimes disputed over the following decades.

One Indus Valley seal shows a seated figure with a horned headdress, possibly tricephalic and possibly ithyphallic, surrounded by animals. Marshall identified the figure as an early form of the Hindu god Shiva (or Rudra), who is associated with asceticism, yoga, and linga; regarded as a lord of animals, and often depicted as having three eyes. The seal has hence come to be known as the Pashupati Seal, after Pashupati (lord of all animals), an epithet of Shiva. While Marshall's work has earned some support, many critics and even supporters have raised several objections. Doris Srinivasan has argued that the figure does not have three faces or yogic posture and that in Vedic literature Rudra was not a protector of wild animals. Herbert Sullivan and Alf Hiltebeitel also rejected Marshall's conclusions, with the former claiming that the figure was female, while the latter associated the figure with Mahisha, the Buffalo God and the surrounding animals with vahanas (vehicles) of deities for the four cardinal directions. Writing in 2002, Gregory L. Possehl concluded that while it would be appropriate to recognise the figure as a deity, its association with the water buffalo, and its posture as one of ritual discipline, regarding it as a proto-Shiva would be going too far. Despite the criticisms of Marshall's association of the seal with a proto-Shiva icon, it has been interpreted as the Tirthankara Rishabhanatha by some scholars of Jainism like Vilas Sangave. Historians such as Heinrich Zimmer and Thomas McEvilley believe that there is a connection between first Jain Tirthankara Rishabhanatha and the Indus Valley Civilisation.

Marshall hypothesised the existence of a cult of Mother Goddess worship based upon excavation of several female figurines and thought that this was a precursor of the Hindu sect of Shaktism. However the function of the female figurines in the life of Indus Valley people remains unclear, and Possehl does not regard the evidence for Marshall's hypothesis to be "terribly robust". Some of the baetyls interpreted by Marshall to be sacred phallic representations are now thought to have been used as pestles or game counters instead, while the ring stones that were thought to symbolise yoni were determined to be architectural features used to stand pillars, although the possibility of their religious symbolism cannot be eliminated. Many Indus Valley seals show animals, with some depicting them being carried in processions, while others show chimeric creations. One seal from Mohenjo-daro shows a half-human, a half-buffalo monster attacking a tiger, which may be a reference to the Sumerian myth of such a monster created by goddess Aruru to fight Gilgamesh.

In contrast to contemporary Egyptian and Mesopotamian civilisations, Indus Valley lacks any monumental palaces, even though excavated cities indicate that the society possessed the requisite engineering knowledge. This may suggest that religious ceremonies if any, may have been largely confined to individual homes, small temples, or the open air. Several sites have been proposed by Marshall and later scholars as possibly devoted to religious purposes, but at present only the Great Bath at Mohenjo-daro is widely thought to have been so used, as a place for ritual purification. The funerary practices of the Harappan civilisation are marked by fractional burial (in which the body is reduced to skeletal remains by exposure to the elements before final interment), and even cremation.

== Late Harappan ==
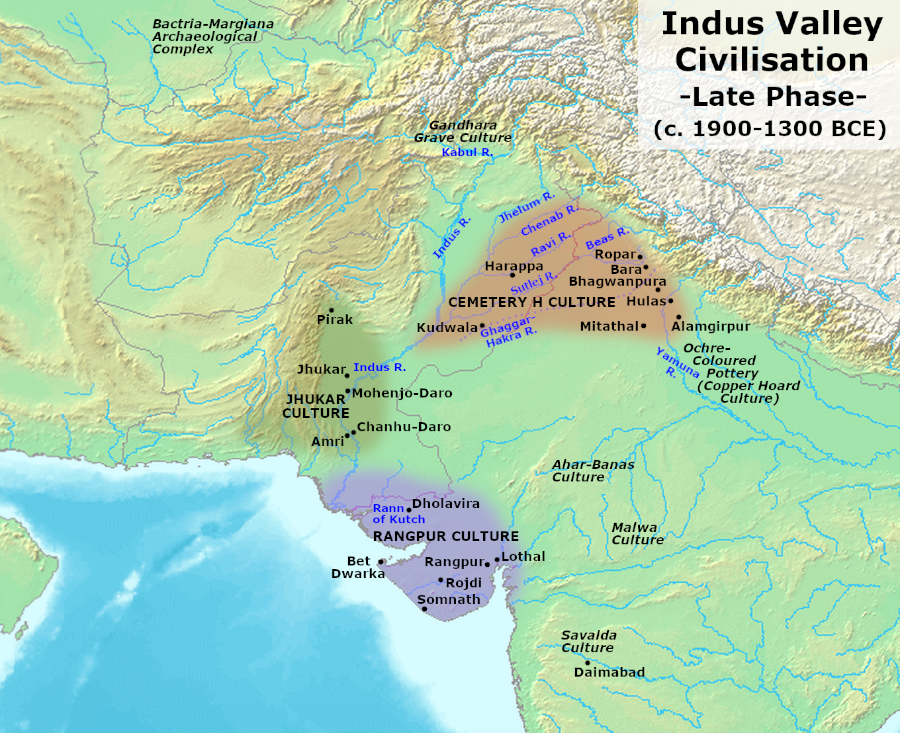
Late Harappan Period, c. 1900–1300 BCE

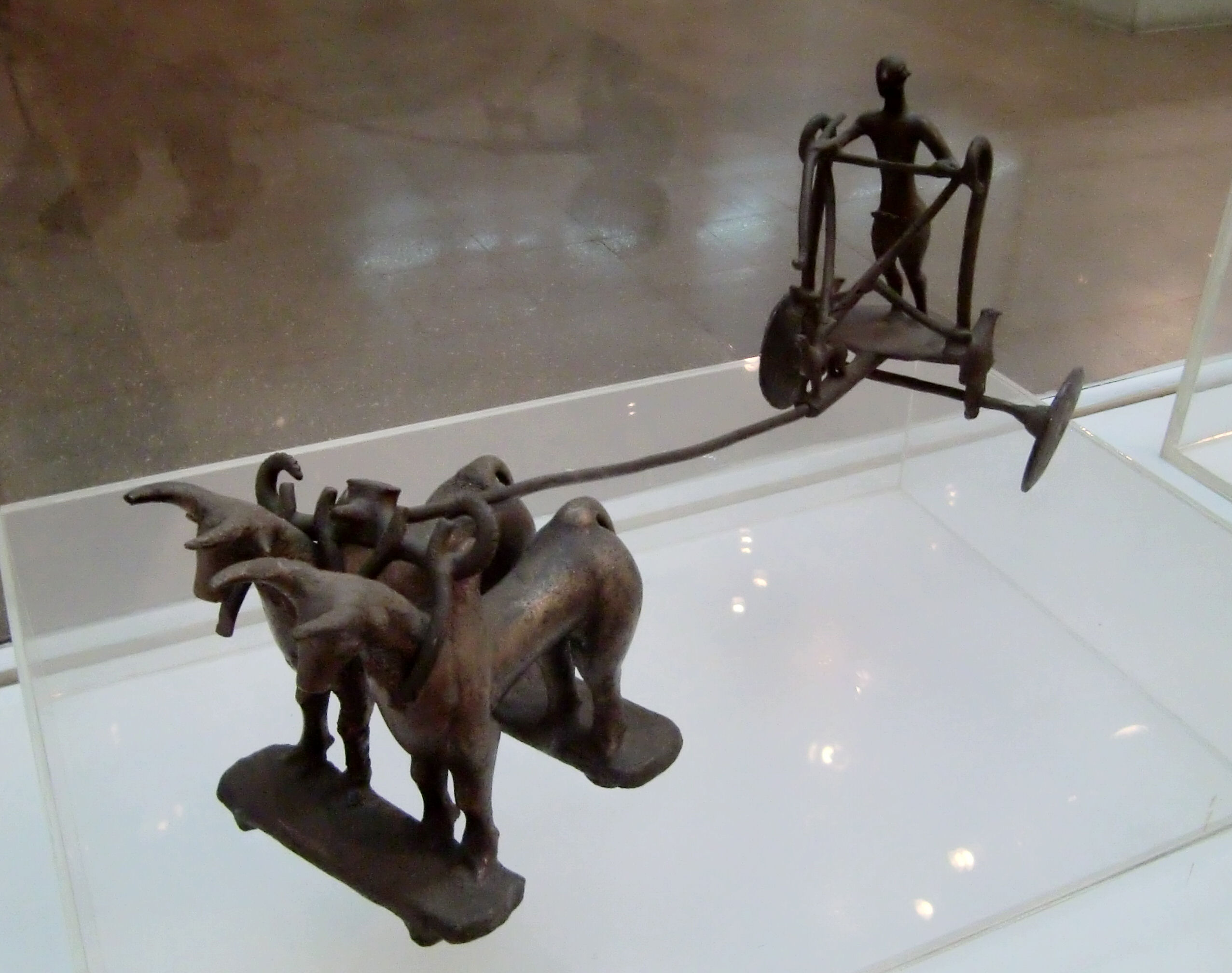
Bronze Late Harappan figures from a hoard at Daimabad, c. 2000 BCE (Prince of Wales Museum, Mumbai)

Around 1900 BCE signs of a gradual decline began to emerge, and by around 1700 BCE most of the cities had been abandoned. Examination of human skeletons from the site of Harappa in the 2010s demonstrated that the end of the Indus civilisation saw an increase in inter-personal violence and in infectious diseases like leprosy and tuberculosis.

According to historian Upinder Singh, "the general picture presented by the late Harappan phase is one of a breakdown of urban networks and an expansion of rural ones."

During the period of approximately 1900 to 1700 BCE, multiple regional cultures emerged within the area of the Indus civilisation. The Cemetery H culture was in Punjab, Haryana, and Western Uttar Pradesh, the Jhukar culture was in Sindh, and the Rangpur culture (characterised by Lustrous Red Ware pottery) was in Gujarat. Other sites associated with the Late phase of the Harappan culture are Pirak in Balochistan, Pakistan, and Daimabad in Maharashtra, India.

The largest Late Harappan sites are Kudwala in Cholistan in Punjab, Bet Dwarka in Gujarat, and Daimabad in Maharashtra, which can be considered as urban, but they are smaller and few in number compared with the Mature Harappan cities. Bet Dwarka was fortified and continued to have contacts with the Persian Gulf region, but there was a general decrease of long-distance trade. On the other hand, the period also saw a diversification of the agricultural base, with a diversity of crops and the advent of double-cropping, as well as a shift of rural settlement towards the east and the south.

The pottery of the Late Harappan period is described as "showing some continuity with mature Harappan pottery traditions", but also distinctive differences. Many sites continued to be occupied for some centuries, although their urban features declined and disappeared. Formerly typical artifacts such as stone weights and female figurines became rare. There are some circular stamp seals with geometric designs, but lacking the Indus script which characterised the mature phase of the civilisation. Script is rare and confined to potsherd inscriptions. There was also a decline in long-distance trade, although the local cultures show new innovations in faience and glass making, and carving of stone beads. Urban amenities such as drains and the public bath were no longer maintained, and newer buildings were "poorly constructed". Stone sculptures were deliberately vandalised, valuables were sometimes concealed in hoards, suggesting unrest, and the corpses of animals and even humans were left unburied in the streets and in abandoned buildings.

During the later half of the 2nd millennium BCE, most of the post-urban Late Harappan settlements were abandoned altogether. Subsequent material culture was typically characterised by temporary occupation, "the campsites of a population which was nomadic and mainly pastoralist" and which used "crude handmade pottery". However, there is greater continuity and overlap between Late Harappan and subsequent cultural phases at sites in Punjab, Haryana, and western Uttar Pradesh, primarily small rural settlements.

=== Aryan migration ===
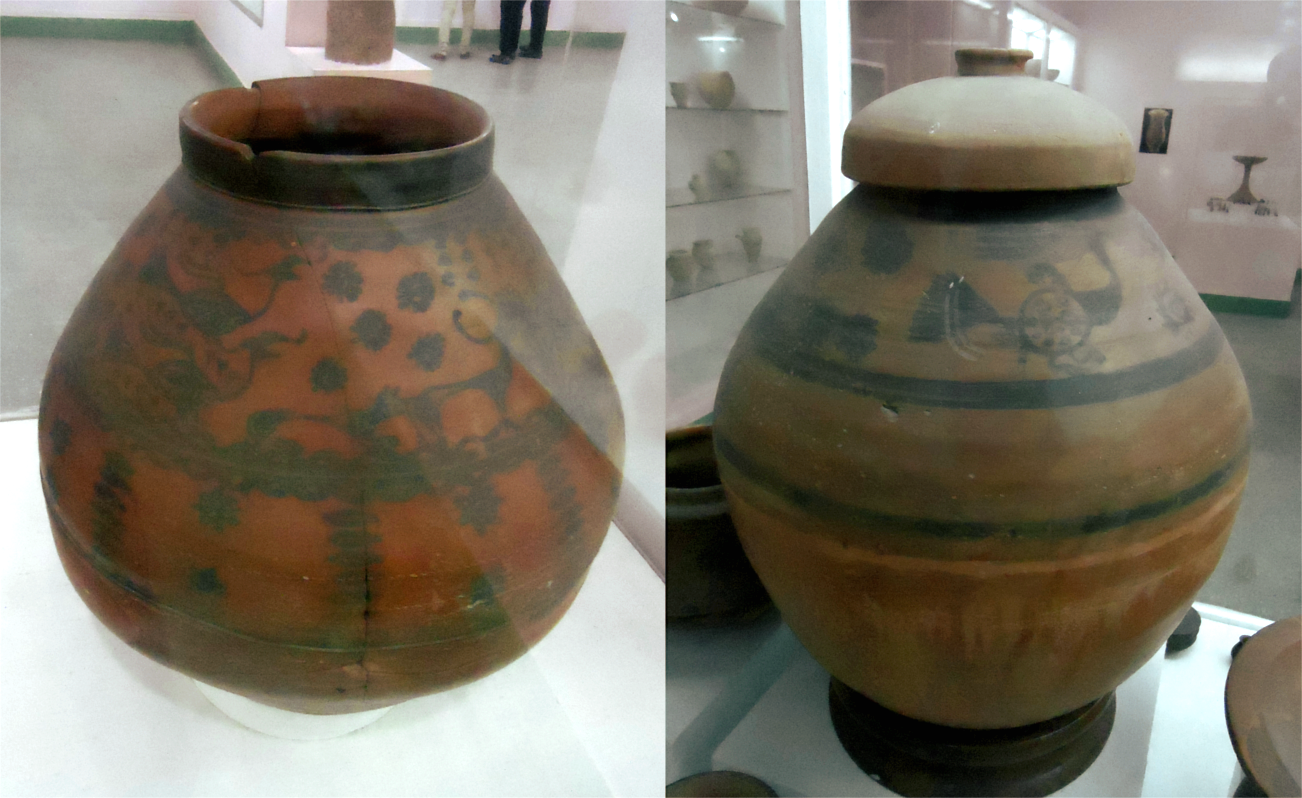
Painted pottery urns from Harappa (Cemetery H culture, c. 1900–1300 BCE), National Museum, New Delhi

In 1953, Sir Mortimer Wheeler proposed that migration by the Aryans, from Central Asia into South Asia, had caused the decline of the Indus civilisation. As evidence, he cited a group of 37 skeletons found in various parts of Mohenjo-daro, and passages in the Vedas referring to battles and forts. However, scholars soon started to reject Wheeler's theory, since the skeletons belonged to a period after the city's abandonment and none were found near the citadel. Subsequent examinations of the skeletons by Kenneth Kennedy in 1994 showed that the marks on the skulls were caused by erosion, and not by violence.

In the Cemetery H culture (the late Harappan phase in the Punjab region), some of the designs painted on the funerary urns have been interpreted through the lens of Vedic literature: for instance, peacocks with hollow bodies and a small human form inside, which has been interpreted as the souls of the dead, and a hound that can be seen as the hound of Yama, the god of death. This may indicate the introduction of new religious beliefs during this period, but the archaeological evidence does not support the hypothesis that the Cemetery H people were the destroyers of the Harappan cities.

=== Climate change and drought ===
Suggested contributory causes for the localisation of the IVC include changes in the course of the river, and climate change that is also signalled for the neighbouring areas of the Middle East. As of 2016 many scholars believe that drought, and a decline in trade with Egypt and Mesopotamia, caused the collapse of the Indus civilisation. The climate change which caused the collapse of the Indus Valley Civilisation was possibly due to "an abrupt and critical mega-drought and cooling 4,200 years ago", which marks the onset of the Meghalayan Age, the present stage of the Holocene.

The Ghaggar-Hakra system was rain-fed, (Note: Geological research by a group led by Peter Clift investigated how the courses of rivers have changed in this region since 8000 years ago, to test whether climate or river reorganisations caused the decline of the Harappan. Using U-Pb dating of zircon sand grains they found that sediments typical of the Beas, Sutlej, and Yamuna rivers (Himalayan tributaries of the Indus) are actually present in former Ghaggar-Hakra channels. However, sediment contributions from these glacial-fed rivers stopped at least by 10,000 years ago, well before the development of the Indus civilisation.) (Note: Tripathi et al. (2004) found that the isotopes of sediments carried by the Ghaggar-Hakra system over the last 20 thousand years do not come from the glaciated Higher Himalaya but have a sub-Himalayan source, and concluded that the river system was rain-fed. They also concluded that this contradicted the idea of a Harappan-time mighty "Sarasvati" river.) and water-supply depended on the monsoons. The Indus Valley climate grew significantly cooler and drier from about 1800 BCE, linked to a general weakening of the monsoon at that time. The Indian monsoon declined and aridity increased, with the Ghaggar-Hakra retracting its reach towards the foothills of the Himalaya, leading to erratic and less extensive floods that made inundation agriculture less sustainable.

Aridification reduced the water supply enough to cause the civilisation's demise, and scatter its population eastward. According to Giosan et al. (2012), the IVC residents did not develop irrigation capabilities, relying mainly on the seasonal monsoons leading to summer floods. As the monsoons kept shifting south, the floods grew too erratic for sustainable agricultural activities. The residents then migrated towards the Ganges basin in the east, where they established smaller villages and isolated farms. The small surplus produced in these small communities did not allow the development of trade, and the cities died out.

=== Continuity and coexistence ===
Archaeological excavations indicate that the decline of Harappa drove people eastward. According to Possehl, after 1900 BCE the number of sites in today's India increased from 218 to 853. According to Andrew Lawler, "excavations along the Gangetic plain show that cities began to arise there starting about 1200 BCE, just a few centuries after Harappa was deserted and much earlier than once suspected." (Note: Most sites of the Painted Grey Ware culture in the Ghaggar-Hakra and Upper Ganges Plain were small farming villages. However, "several dozen" PGW sites eventually emerged as relatively large settlements that can be characterised as towns, the largest of which were fortified by ditches or moats and embankments made of piled earth with wooden palisades, albeit smaller and simpler than the elaborately fortified large cities which grew after 600 BCE in the more fully urban Northern Black Polished Ware culture.) According to Jim Shaffer there was a continuous series of cultural developments, just as in most areas of the world. These link "the so-called two major phases of urbanisation in South Asia".

At sites such as Bhagwanpura (in Haryana), archaeological excavations have discovered an overlap between the final phase of Late Harappan pottery and the earliest phase of Painted Grey Ware pottery, the latter being associated with the Vedic culture and dating from around 1200 BCE. This site provides evidence of multiple social groups occupying the same village but using different pottery and living in different types of houses: "over time the Late Harappan pottery was gradually replaced by Painted Grey ware pottery," and other cultural changes indicated by archaeology include the introduction of the horse, iron tools, and new religious practices.

There is also a Harappan site called Rojdi in Rajkot district of Saurashtra. Its excavation started under an archaeological team from Gujarat State Department of Archaeology and the Museum of the University of Pennsylvania in 1982–83. In their report on archaeological excavations at Rojdi, Gregory Possehl and M.H. Raval write that although there are "obvious signs of cultural continuity" between the Harappan civilisation and later South Asian cultures, many aspects of the Harappan "sociocultural system" and "integrated civilisation" were "lost forever," while the Second Urbanisation of India (beginning with the Northern Black Polished Ware culture, c. 600 BCE) "lies well outside this sociocultural environment".

== Post-Harappan ==
Previously, scholars believed that the decline of the Harappan civilisation led to an interruption of urban life in the Indian subcontinent. However, the Indus Valley Civilisation did not disappear suddenly, and many elements of the Indus civilisation appear in later cultures. The Cemetery H culture may be the manifestation of the Late Harappan over a large area in the region of Punjab, Haryana and western Uttar Pradesh, and the Ochre Coloured Pottery culture its successor. David Gordon White cites three other mainstream scholars who "have emphatically demonstrated" that Vedic religion derives partially from the Indus Valley Civilisations.

As of 2016, archaeological data suggests that the material culture classified as Late Harappan may have persisted until at least c. 1000–900 BCE and was partially contemporaneous with the Painted Grey Ware culture. Harvard archaeologist Richard Meadow points to the late Harappan settlement of Pirak, which thrived continuously from 1800 BCE to the time of the invasion of Alexander the Great in 325 BCE.

In the aftermath of the Indus civilisation's localisation, regional cultures emerged, to varying degrees showing the influence of the Indus civilisation. In the formerly great city of Harappa, burials have been found that correspond to a regional culture called the Cemetery H culture. At the same time, the Ochre Coloured Pottery culture expanded from Rajasthan into the Gangetic Plain. The Cemetery H culture has the earliest evidence for cremation; a practice dominant in Hinduism today.

The inhabitants of the Indus Valley Civilisation migrated from the river valleys of Indus and Ghaggar-Hakra, towards the Himalayan foothills of the Ganga-Yamuna basin.

== Genetics ==
In 2019, a study was published by Shinde et al. on a reconstructed genome obtained from a female skeleton found in an IVC-related cemetery in Rakhigarhi, Haryana, India, dating to around 2,800–2,300 BCE. The analysis suggested that the majority of the genome was closely related to Mesolithic Iranian hunter-gatherers. The remaining portion of the genome was from a source deeply related to the Andamanese Hunter Gatherers, thought to represent the indigenous South Asian hunter-gatherer ancestry termed Ancient Ancestral South Indian (AASI). The genome completely lacked the Western Steppe Herder-related ancestry that is found in modern (particularly in northern) South Asians, or any Anatolian Neolithic farmer ancestry, and predates the Indo-Aryan migrations. The ancestry of the IVC-related individual is similar to the majority of the ancestry of modern South Asians. There is some disputed evidence of matrilocality.

== See also ==
- Cradle of civilisation
- History of Hinduism
- History of Afghanistan
- History of India
- History of Pakistan
- List of Indus Valley Civilisation sites
- List of inventions and discoveries of the Indus Valley Civilisation
- Religion of the Indus Valley Civilisation
- Sanitation of the Indus Valley Civilisation
- Hydraulic engineering of the Indus Valley Civilisation

== Bibliography ==
- Allchin, Bridget; Allchin, Raymond (1982). The Rise of Civilization in India and Pakistan. Cambridge University Press. ISBN 978-0-521-28550-6. Archived from the original on 25 February 2024.
- Allchin, F. Raymond, ed. (1995). The Archaeology of Early Historic South Asia: The Emergence of Cities and States. New York: Cambridge University Press. ISBN 978-0-521-37695-2.
- Brooke, John L. (2014). Climate Change and the Course of Global History: A Rough Journey. Cambridge University Press. ISBN 978-0-521-87164-8.
- Cavalli-Sforza, Luigi Luca; Menozzi, Paolo; Piazza, Alberto (1994). The History and Geography of Human Genes. Princeton University Press.
- Clift PD, Carter A, Giosan L, Durcan J, et al. (March 2012). "U-Pb zircon dating evidence for a Pleistocene Sarasvati River and capture of the Yamuna River". Geology. 40 (3): 211–214. Bibcode:2012Geo....40..211C. doi:10.1130/G32840.1.
- Cunningham, Alexander (1875). Archaeological Survey of India, Report for the Year 1872–1873, Vol. 5. Calcutta: The Superintendent Of Government. Archaeological Survey of India
- Coningham, Robin; Young, Ruth (2015). The Archaeology of South Asia: From the Indus to Asoka, c. 6500 BCE – 200 CE. Cambridge University Press. ISBN 978-1-316-41898-7.
- Costantini, L. (2008). "The first farmers in Western Pakistan: The evidence of the Neolithic agropastoral settlement of Mehrgarh". Pragdhara. 18: 167–178.
- Derenko, Miroslava (2013). "Complete Mitochondrial DNA Diversity in Iranians". PLOS ONE. 8 (11) 80673. Bibcode:2013PLoSO...880673D. doi:10.1371/journal.pone.0080673. PMC 3828245. PMID 24244704.
- Dyson, Tim (2018). A Population History of India: From the First Modern People to the Present Day. Oxford University Press. ISBN 978-0-19-882905-8. Archived from the original on 29 March 2024.
- Fisher, Michael H. (2018). An Environmental History of India: From Earliest Times to the Twenty-First Century. Cambridge University Press. ISBN 978-1-107-11162-2. Archived from the original on 28 March 2024.
- Flora, Reis (2000). "Classification of Musical Instruments". In Arnold, Alison (ed.). The Garland Encyclopedia of World Music: South Asia: The Indian Subcontinent. New York: Garland Publishing Inc. pp. 319–330. ISBN 978-0-8240-4946-1.
- Fuller, D.Q. (2006). "Agricultural origins and frontiers in South Asia: a working synthesis". Journal of World Prehistory. 20: 1–86. doi:10.1007/s10963-006-9006-8.
- Gallego Romero, Irene; et al. (2011). "Herders of Indian and European Cattle Share their Predominant Allele for Lactase Persistence". Mol. Biol. Evol. 29 (1): 249–260. doi:10.1093/molbev/msr190. PMID 21836184.
- Gangal, Kavita; Sarson, Graeme R.; Shukurov, Anvar (2014). "The Near-Eastern roots of the Neolithic in South Asia". PLOS ONE. 9 (5). e95714. Bibcode:2014PLoSO...995714G. doi:10.1371/journal.pone.0095714. PMC 4012948. PMID 24806472.
- Giosan L, Clift PD, Macklin MG, Fuller DQ, et al. (2012). "Fluvial landscapes of the Harappan civilization". Proceedings of the National Academy of Sciences. 109 (26): E1688–E1694. Bibcode:2012PNAS..109E1688G. doi:10.1073/pnas.1112743109. PMC 3387054. PMID 22645375.
- Habib, Irfan (2015). The Indus Civilization. Tulika Books. ISBN 978-93-82381-53-2.
- Habib, Irfan (2002). The Making of History: Essays Presented to Irfan Habib. Anthem Press.
- Heggarty, Paul; Renfrew, Collin (2014). "South and Island Southeast Asia; Languages". In Renfrew, Collin; Bahn, Paul (eds.). The Cambridge World Prehistory. Cambridge University Press.
- Hiltebeitel, Alf (2011). "The Indus Valley "Proto-Śiva", Re-examined through Reflections on the Goddess, the Buffalo, and the Symbolism of vāhanas". In Adluri, Vishwa; Bagchee, Joydeep (eds.). When the Goddess was a Woman: Mahabharata Ethnographies – Essays by Alf Hiltebeitel. Brill. ISBN 978-90-04-19380-2. Archived from the original on 20 January 2023.
- Hoffman, Brett (2019). "Indus Tradition Copper and Bronze Metallurgy: A Model from Harappa - Ph.D. Thesis" (PDF). University of Wisconsin-Madison.
- Jarrige, Jean-Francois (2008a). "Mehrgarh Neolithic" ( (PDF)). Pragdhara. International Seminar on the First Farmers in Global Perspective – Lucknow, India – 18–20 January 2006. Vol. 18. pp. 136–154. Archived from the original on 3 March 2016.
- Jarrige, C. (2008b). "The figurines of the first farmers at Mehrgarh and their offshoots". Pragdhara. 18: 155–166.
- Kenoyer, Jonathan Mark (1991). "The Indus Valley tradition of Pakistan and Western India". Journal of World Prehistory. 5 (4): 1–64. Bibcode:1991JWPre...5..331K. doi:10.1007/BF00978474.
- Kenoyer, Jonathan Mark (1997). "Trade and Technology of the Indus Valley: New Insights from Harappa, Pakistan". World Archaeology. 29 (2: "High–Definition Archaeology: Threads Through the Past"): 262–280. Bibcode:1997WoArc..29..262K. doi:10.1080/00438243.1997.9980377.
- Kenoyer, Jonathan Mark (1998). Ancient cities of the Indus Valley Civilisation. Oxford University Press. ISBN 978-0-19-577940-0.
- Kenoyer, Jonathan Mark. "Cultures and Societies of the Indus Tradition. In Historical Roots". In Thapar (2006), pp. 21–49.
- Kivisild T, Bamshad MJ, Kaldma K, Metspalu M, et al. (1999). "Deep common ancestry of Indian and western-Eurasian mitochondrial DNA lineages". Curr. Biol. 9 (22): 1331–1334. Bibcode:1999CBio....9.1331K. doi:10.1016/s0960-9822(00)80057-3. PMID 10574762.
- Kumar, Dhavendra (2004). Genetic Disorders of the Indian Subcontinent. Springer. ISBN 978-1-4020-1215-0. Archived from the original on 9 April 2023.
- Lal, B.B. (2002). The Sarasvati flows on.
- MacDonald, Glen (2011). "Potential influence of the Pacific Ocean on the Indian summer monsoon and Harappan decline". Quaternary International. 229 (1–2): 140–148. Bibcode:2011QuInt.229..140M. doi:10.1016/j.quaint.2009.11.012.
- Madella, Marco; Fuller, Dorian Q. (2006). "Palaeoecology and the Harappan Civilisation of South Asia: a reconsideration". Quaternary Science Reviews. 25 (11–12): 1283–1301. Bibcode:2006QSRv...25.1283M. doi:10.1016/j.quascirev.2005.10.012.
- Mallory, J.P.; Adams, Douglas Q., eds. (1997). Encyclopedia of Indo-European Culture. Taylor & Francis. ISBN 978-1-884964-98-5. Archived from the original on 19 February 2023.
- Manuel, Mark (2010). "Chronology and Culture-History in the Indus Valley". In Gunawardhana, P.; Adikari, G.; Coningham, R.A.E. (eds.). Sirinimal Lakdusinghe Felicitation Volume. Battaramulla: Neptune Publication. pp. 145–152. ISBN 978-955-0028-05-4. Archived from the original on 5 June 2022.
- Marshall, John, ed. (1931). Mohenjo-Daro and the Indus Civilization: Being an Official Account of Archaeological Excavations at Mohenjo-Daro Carried Out by the Government of India Between the Years 1922 and 1927. London: Arthur Probsthain.
- Marshall, John, ed. (1996) [1931]. Mohenjo-Daro and the Indus Civilization: Being an Official Account of Archaeological Excavations at Mohenjo-Daro Carried Out by the Government of India Between the Years 1922 and 1927. Asian Educational Services. ISBN 978-81-206-1179-5. Archived from the original on 23 December 2023.
- Mascarenhas, Desmond D.; Raina, Anupuma; Aston, Christopher E.; Sanghera, Dharambir K. (2015). "Genetic and Cultural Reconstruction of the Migration of an Ancient Lineage". BioMed Research International. 2015: 1–16. doi:10.1155/2015/651415. PMC 4605215. PMID 26491681.
- Masson, Charles (1842). Narrative of Various Journeys in Balochistan, Afghanistan and the Panjab: Including a Residence in Those Countries from 1826 to 1838, Volume 1. London: Richard Bentley.
- Mathew, K.S. (2017). Shipbuilding, Navigation and the Portuguese in Pre-modern India. Routledge. ISBN 978-1-351-58833-1.
- McIntosh, Jane (2008). The Ancient Indus Valley: New Perspectives. ABC-Clio. ISBN 978-1-57607-907-2.
- Michon, Daniel (2015). Archaeology and Religion in Early Northwest India: History, Theory, Practice. Taylor & Francis. ISBN 978-1-317-32457-7.
- Morris, A.E.J. (1994). History of Urban Form: Before the Industrial Revolutions (3rd ed.). New York: Routledge. ISBN 978-0-582-30154-2. Archived from the original on 15 December 2023.
- Mukherjee, Namita; Nebel, Almut; Oppenheim, Ariella; Majumder, Partha P. (2001). "High-resolution analysis of Y-chromosomal polymorphisms reveals signatures of population movements from central Asia and West Asia into India". Journal of Genetics. 80 (3): 125–135. doi:10.1007/BF02717908. PMID 11988631.
- Palanichamy, Malliya Gounder (2015). "West Eurasian mtDNA lineages in India: an insight into the spread of the Dravidian language and the origins of the caste system". Human Genetics. 134 (6): 637–647. doi:10.1007/s00439-015-1547-4. PMID 25832481.
- Parpola, Asko (19 May 2005). "Study of the Indus Script" (PDF). Archived from the original (PDF) on 6 March 2006. (50th ICES Tokyo Session)
- Parpola, Asko (2015). The Roots of Hinduism. The Early Aryans and the Indus Civilisation. Oxford University Press.
- Ponton, Camilo; Giosan, Liviu; Eglinton, Tim I.; Fuller, Dorian Q.; et al. (2012). "Holocene aridification of India". Geophysical Research Letters. 39 (3). L03704. Bibcode:2012GeoRL..39.3704P. doi:10.1029/2011GL050722. hdl:1912/5100.
- Possehl, Gregory L. (2002). The Indus Civilization: A Contemporary Perspective. Rowman Altamira. ISBN 978-0-7591-1642-9. Archived from the original on 20 January 2023.
- Possehl, Gregory L. (2002a). "Harappans and hunters: economic interaction and specialization in prehistoric India". In Morrison, Kathleen D.; Junker, Laura L. (eds.). Forager-Traders in South and Southeast Asia: Long-Term Histories. Cambridge University Press. pp. 62–76. ISBN 978-0-521-01636-0.
- Rashid, Harunur; England, Emily; Thompson, Lonnie; Polyak, Leonid (2011). "Late Glacial to Holocene Indian Summer Monsoon Variability Based upon Sediment Records Taken from the Bay of Bengal". Terrestrial, Atmospheric and Oceanic Sciences. 22 (2): 215–228. Bibcode:2011TAOS...22..215R. doi:10.3319/TAO.2010.09.17.02(TibXS).
- Ratnagar, Shereen (April 2004). "Archaeology at the Heart of a Political Confrontation The Case of Ayodhya". Current Anthropology. 45 (2): 239–259. doi:10.1086/381044. JSTOR 10.1086/381044.
- Ratnagar, Shereen (2006a). Trading Encounters: From the Euphrates to the Indus in the Bronze Age (2nd ed.). India: Oxford University Press. ISBN 978-0-19-566603-8.
- Ratnagar, Shereen (2006b). Understanding Harappa: Civilization in the Greater Indus Valley. New Delhi: Tulika Books. ISBN 978-81-89487-02-7.
- Sarkar, Anindya; Mukherjee, Arati Deshpande; Bera, M. K.; Das, B.; et al. (May 2016). "Oxygen isotope in archaeological bioapatites from India: Implications to climate change and decline of Bronze Age Harappan civilization". Scientific Reports. 6 (1). 26555. Bibcode:2016NatSR...626555S. doi:10.1038/srep26555. PMC 4879637. PMID 27222033.
- Shaffer, Jim G. (1992). "The Indus Valley, Baluchistan and Helmand Traditions: Neolithic Through Bronze Age". In R.W. Ehrich (ed.). Chronologies in Old World Archaeology (Second ed.). Chicago: University of Chicago Press.
- Shaffer, Jim G. (1999). "Migration, Philology and South Asian Archaeology". In Bronkhorst; Deshpande (eds.). Aryan and Non-Aryan in South Asia. Cambridge: Harvard University, Dept. of Sanskrit and Indian Studies. ISBN 978-1-888789-04-1.
- Singh, Kavita (2017). "The Museum Is National". In Mathur, Saloni; Singh, Kavita (eds.). No Touching, No Spitting, No Praying. pp. 107–131. doi:10.4324/9781315090481. ISBN 978-1-315-09048-1. (nb this is different to the article by the same author with the same title: Singh, Kavita (2002). "The Museum is National". India International Centre Quarterly. 29 (3/4): 176–196. JSTOR 23005825., which does not mention the IVC objects)
- Singh, Sakshi; et al. (2016). "Dissecting the influence of Neolithic demic diffusion on Indian Y-chromosome pool through J2-M172 haplogroup". Scientific Reports. 6 19157. Bibcode:2016NatSR...619157S. doi:10.1038/srep19157. PMC 4709632. PMID 26754573.
- Singh, Upinder (2008). A History of Ancient and Early Medieval India: From the Stone Age to the 12th Century. Pearson Education India. ISBN 978-81-317-1120-0. Archived from the original on 28 March 2024.
- Srinivasan, Doris (1975). "The so-called Proto-Śiva seal from Mohenjo-Daro: An iconological assessment". Archives of Asian Art. 29: 47–58. JSTOR 20062578.
- Srinivasan, Doris Meth (1997). Many Heads, Arms and Eyes: Origin, Meaning and Form in Multiplicity in Indian Art. Brill. ISBN 978-90-04-10758-8. Archived from the original on 20 January 2023.
- Staubwasser, M.; Sirocko, F.; Grootes, P. M.; Segl, M. (2003). "Climate change at the 4.2 ka BP termination of the Indus valley civilization and Holocene south Asian monsoon variability". Geophysical Research Letters. 30 (8): 1425. Bibcode:2003GeoRL..30.1425S. doi:10.1029/2002GL016822.
- Sullivan, Herbert P. (1964). "A Re-Examination of the Religion of the Indus Civilization". History of Religions. 4 (1): 115–125. doi:10.1086/462498. JSTOR 1061875.
- Thapar, Romila (2004). Early India: From the Origins to AD 1300. University of California Press. ISBN 978-0-520-24225-8. Archived from the original on 20 January 2023.
- Thapar, Romila, ed. (2006). the Making of 'the Aryan'. New Delhi: National Book Trust.
- Wright, Rita P. (2009). The Ancient Indus: Urbanism, Economy, and Society. Cambridge University Press. ISBN 978-0-521-57219-4.
