= Pashupati seal =

Steatite seal discovered at Mohenjo-daro

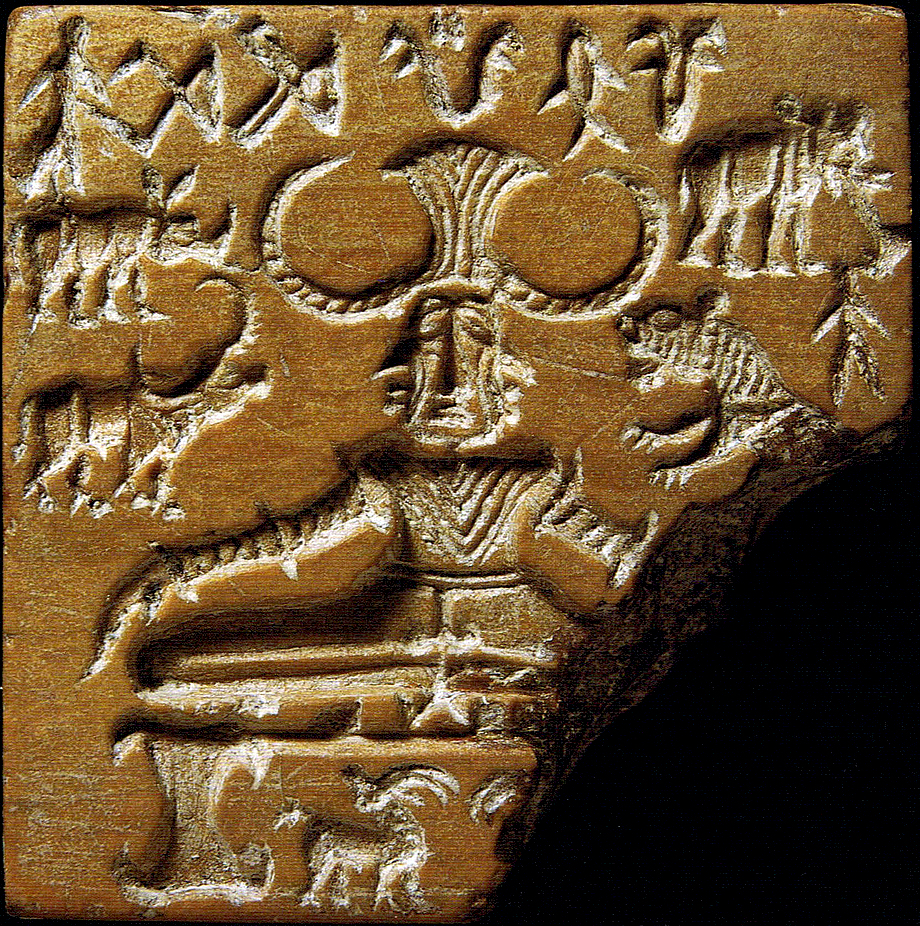
- The Pashupati seal, showing a seated and possibly tricephalic figure, surrounded by animals
- Material: Steatite
- Height: 3.56 cm
- Width: 3.53 cm
- Created: c. 2200 BC
- Discovered: 1928 or 1929; British Raj, present-day Pakistan
- Present location: National Museum of India, Delhi, India

The Pashupati seal (also Mahayogi seal, Proto-Śhiva seal the adjective "so-called" sometimes applied to "Pashupati"), is a steatite seal which was uncovered in Mohenjo-daro, a major urban site of the Indus Valley Civilisation ("IVC") in present-day Pakistan, during excavations in 1928 or 1929 when the region was under British rule. The excavations were carried out by the Archaeological Survey of India, the official body responsible for preservation and excavation. The seal depicts a seated figure that is possibly tricephalic (having three heads). The seated figure has been thought to be ithyphallic, an interpretation that has been questioned by many, but was still held by the IVC specialist Jonathan Mark Kenoyer in a publication of 2003. The man has a horned headdress and is surrounded by animals. He may represent a horned deity.

It has one of the more complicated designs in the thousands of seals found from the Indus Valley civilization, and is unusual in having a human figure as the main and largest element; in most seals this is an animal. It had been claimed to be one of the earliest depictions of the Hindu god Shiva—"Pashupati" (Lord of animals) being one of his epithets, or a "proto-Shiva" deity.

Though the combination of elements in the Pashupati seal is unique, there are a group of other Indus seals that have some of them. One, also from Mohenjo-daro (find number DK 12050) and now in Islamabad, has a nude three-faced horned deity seated on a throne in a yogic position, wearing bangles on its arms. In this case no animals are depicted, and there is some dispute as to the gender of the figure, despite it seeming to have a beard.

The Pashupati seal is in the National Museum of India, having been moved there with the other Mohenjo-daro finds before independence. These were reserved for the future national museum, finally founded in 1949, and the seal was allocated to the Dominion of India at Partition in 1947.

== Discovery and description ==
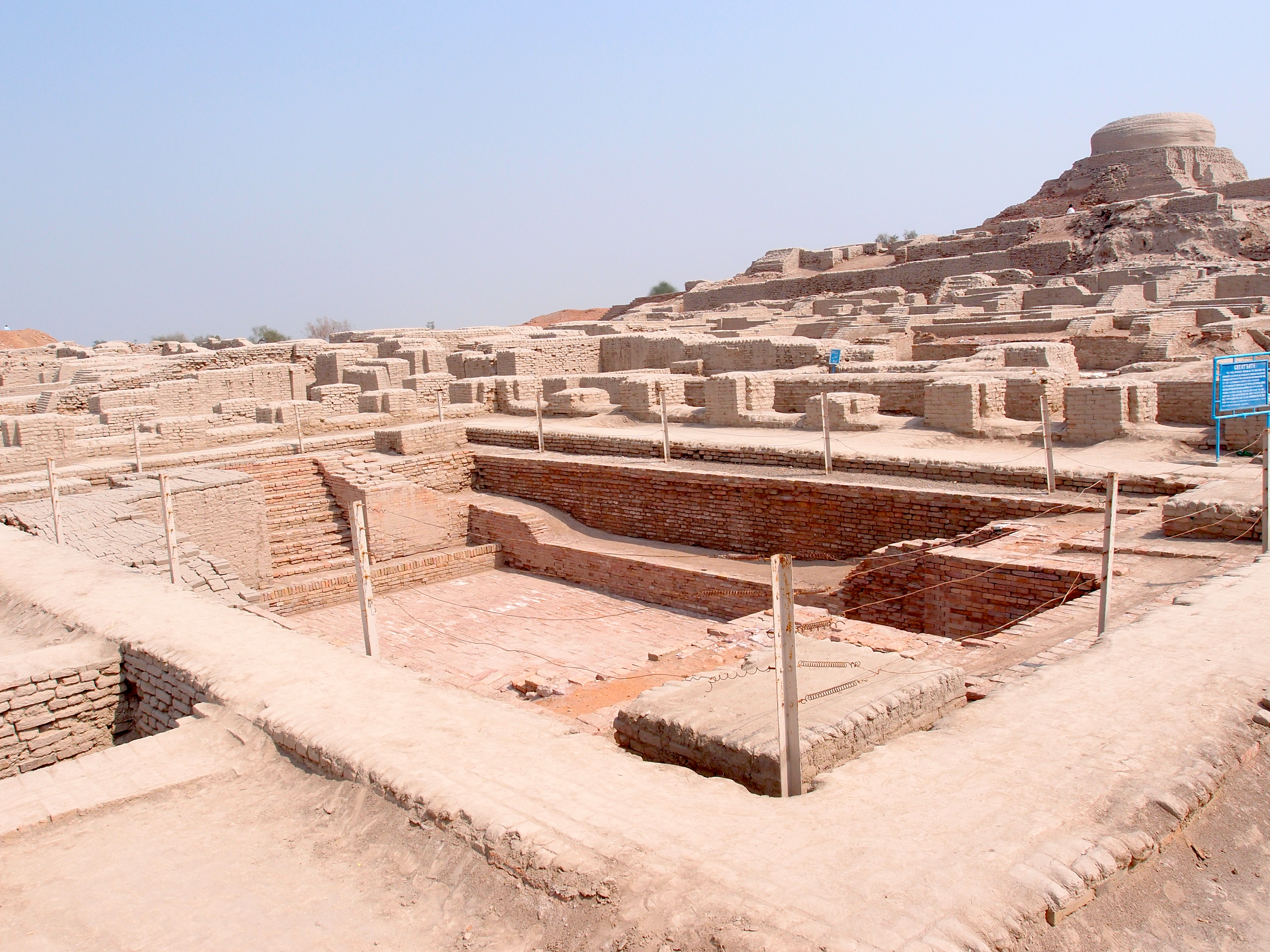
A view of the Mohenjo-daro excavation site. The DK-G Area where the seal was found lies north-east of the Great Bath seen in the foreground

The seal was uncovered in 1928 or 1929, in Block 1, Southern Portion of the DK-G Area of Mohenjo-daro, at a depth of 3.9 meters below the surface. Ernest Mackay, who directed the excavations at Mohenjo-daro, dated the seal to the Intermediate I Period (now considered to fall around 2350–2000 BCE) in his 1937–1938 report in which the seal is numbered 420, giving it its alternate name.

The seal is carved in steatite and measures 3.56 cm by 3.53 cm, with a thickness of 7.6 mm. It has a human figure at the centre seated on a platform and facing forward. The legs of the figure are bent at the knees with the heels touching and the toes pointing downwards. The arms extend outwards and rest lightly on the knees, with the thumbs facing away from the body. Eight small and three large bangles cover the arms. The chest is covered with what appear to be necklaces, and a double band wraps around the waist. The figure wears a tall and elaborate headdress with a central fan-shaped structure flanked by two large striated horns. The human figure is surrounded by four wild animals: an elephant and a tiger to its one side, and a water buffalo (bubalus arnee) and an Indian rhinoceros on the other. Under the dais are two deer or ibexes looking backwards, so that their curved horns almost meet in the centre. At the top of the seal are seven Indus script symbols, with the last apparently displaced downwards for lack of horizontal space.

== Post-excavation history ==
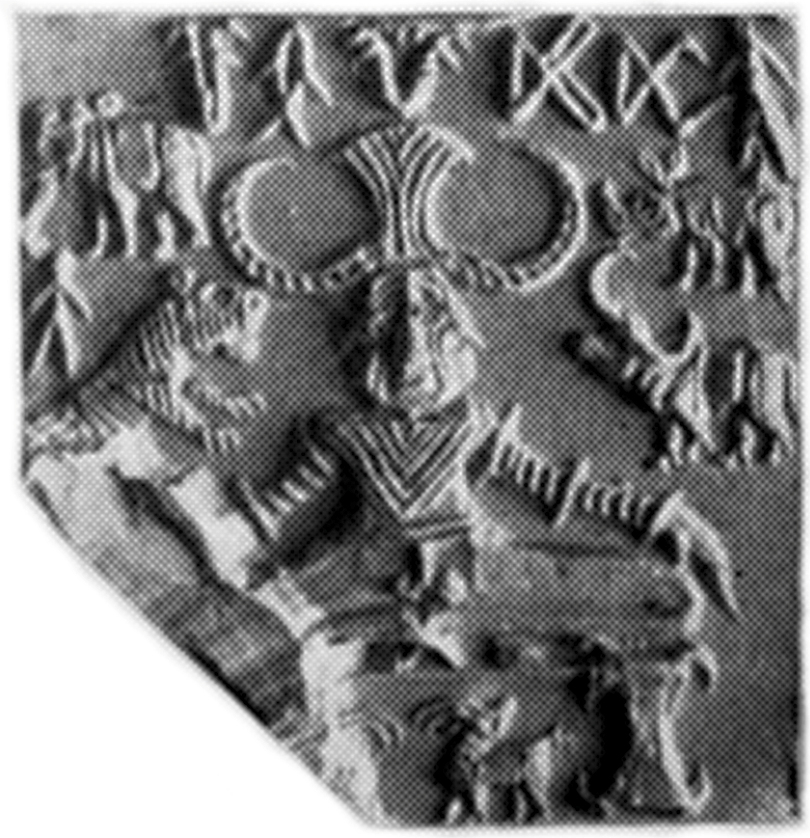
An impression made from the steatite seal

The finds from Mohenjo-daro were initially deposited in the Lahore Museum, but later moved to the ASI headquarters in New Delhi, where a new "Central Imperial Museum" was being planned for the new capital of the British Raj, in which at least a selection would be displayed. It became apparent that Indian independence was approaching, but the Partition of India was not anticipated until late in the process. The new Pakistani authorities requested the return of the Harappan pieces excavated on their territory, but the Indian authorities refused. Eventually an agreement was reached, whereby the finds, totalling some 12,000 objects (most sherds of pottery), were split equally between the countries; in some cases this was taken very literally, with some necklaces and girdles having their beads separated into two piles. In the case of the "two most celebrated sculpted figures", Pakistan asked for and received the Priest-King figure, while India retained the Dancing Girl, and also the Pashupati seal.

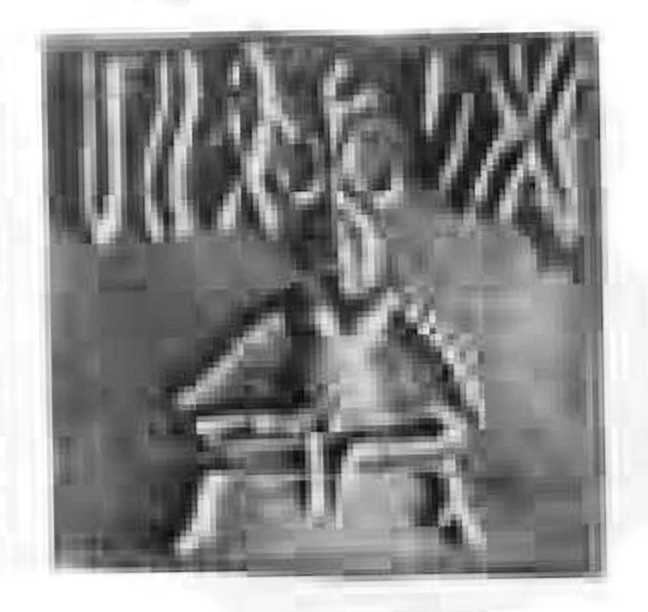
Mohenjo-daro, Seated figure 222

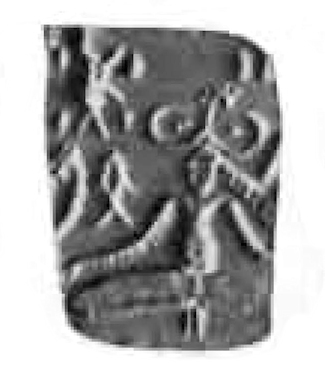
Mohenjo-daro, Seated figure 235

== Interpretations ==
=== Marshall's identification with proto-Shiva ===
The first description and analysis of the seal's iconography was that of the archaeologist John Marshall who had served as the Director-General of the Archaeological Survey of India and led the excavations of the Indus Valley sites. In addition to the general features of the seal described above, he also saw the central figure as a male deity as three-faced, with a possible fourth face towards the back and, as ithyphallic, while conceding that what appeared to be the exposed phallus could instead be a tassel hanging from the waistband. Most significantly he identified the seal as an early prototype of the Hindu god Shiva (or, his Vedic predecessor, Rudra), who also was known by the title Pashupati ('lord or father of all the animals') in historic times. In a 1928–29 publication, Marshall summarized his reasons for the identification as follows:

My reasons for the identification are four. In the first place the figure has three faces and that Siva was portrayed with three as well as with more usual five faces, there are abundant examples to prove. Secondly, the head is crowned with the horns of a bull and the trisula are characteristic emblems of Siva. Thirdly, the figure is in a typical yoga attitude, and Siva [sic] was and still is, regarded as a mahayogi—the prince of Yogis. Fourthly, he is surrounded by animals, and Siva is par excellence the "Lord of Animals" (Pasupati)—of the wild animals of the jungle, according to the Vedic meaning of the word pashu, no less than that of domesticated cattle.

Later, in 1931, he expanded his reasons to include the fact that Shiva is associated with the phallus in the form of linga, and that in medieval art he is shown with deer or ibexes, as are seen below the throne on the seal. Marshall's analysis of the Indus Valley religion, and the Pashupati seal in particular, was very influential and widely accepted for at least the next two generations. Herbert Sullivan, who had significant disagreements with it, recognised in 1964 that Marshall's analysis "has been accepted almost universally and has greatly influenced scholarly understanding of the historical development of Hinduism".

Writing in 1976, Doris Srinivasan introduced an article otherwise critical of Marshall's interpretation by observing that "no matter what position is taken regarding the seal's iconography, it is always prefaced by Marshall's interpretation. On balance the proto-Śiva character of the seal has been accepted." Thomas McEvilley noted, in line with Marshall, that the central figure was in the yoga pose Mulabandhasana, quoting the Kalpa Sutra's description "a squatting position with joined heels" used with meditation and fasting to attain infinite knowledge (kevala).

Alf Hiltebeitel noted in 2011 that, following Marshall's analysis, "nearly all efforts at interpreting the [Indus Valley] religion have centered discussion around [the Pashupati seal] figure". A lot of discussion has taken place about this seal. While Marshall's work has earned some support, many critics and even supporters have raised several objections.

Herbert Sullivan interpreted the figure as a female goddess on the grounds that the so-called erect phallus actually represents the dangling end of a waistband or girdle, a feature found on many undoubtedly female terracotta figurines, and ambiguous on some other seals, including DK 12050 (mentioned above). Marshall himself had admitted this was possible. In the terracottas, males are always nude; in addition, the jewellery worn on the Pashupati seal is characteristic of female rather than male terracottas.

=== Doris Srinivasan's reinterpretation ===
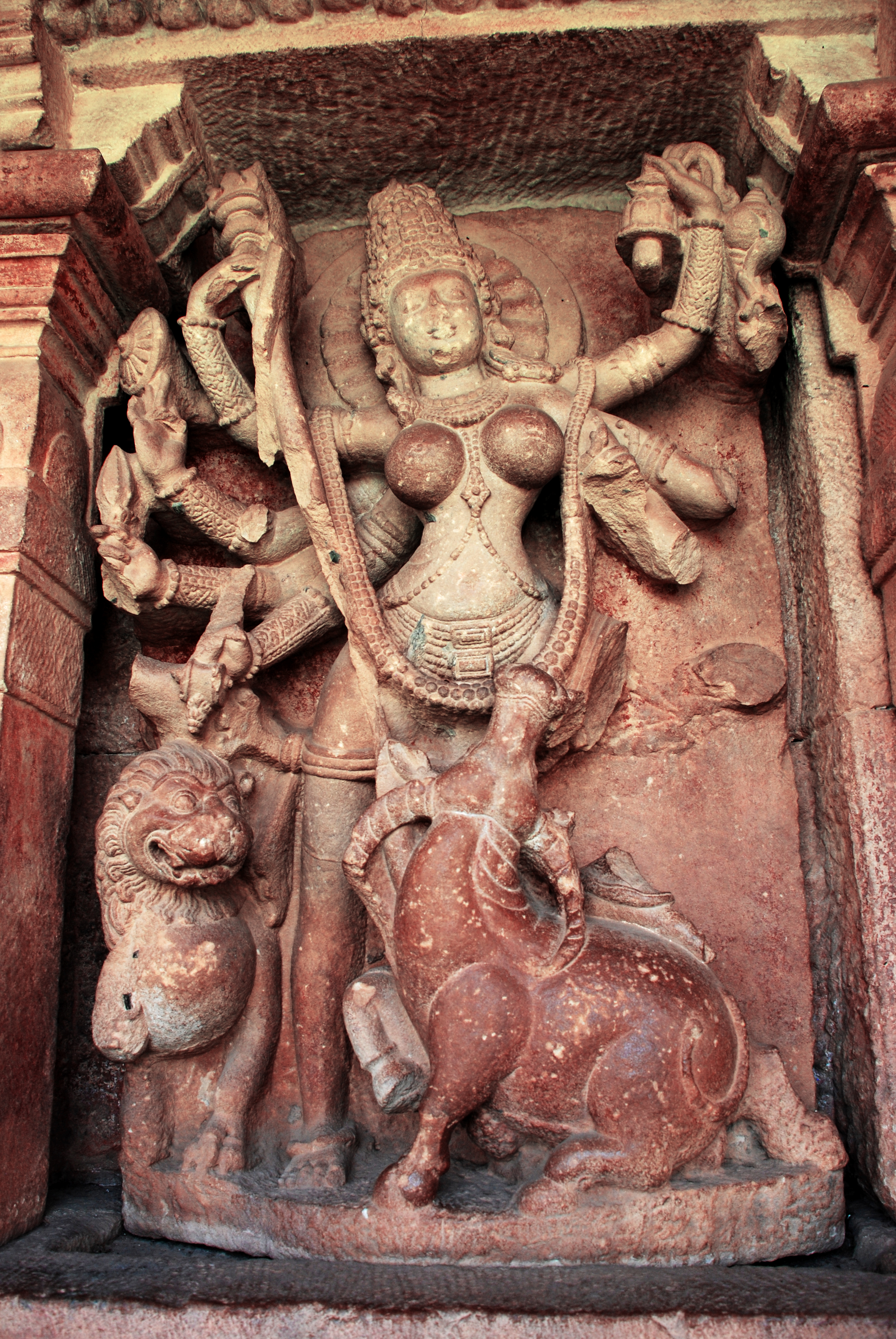
Mahishasura, the buffalo demon being slayed by the goddess Durga. Durga Temple, Aihole

Doris Srinivasan, a professor of Indian studies, raised objections to Marshall's identification, and provided a interpretation for the figure, where she postulated the lateral projections were cow-like ears rather than faces, which had already been suggested by Sullivan and others. In 1975 or 1976, she published a journal article titled 'The So-Called Proto-śiva Seal from Mohenjo-Daro: An Iconological Assessment' in the academic journal Archives of Asian Art. In 1997, she reiterated her views in a book titled Many Heads, Arms, and Eyes: Origin, Meaning, and Form of Multiplicity in Indian Art.

According to her, the two extra faces could be reinterpreted as possible ears, and the central face has predominant bovine features. She has drawn similarities between the central figure of seal 420, and other artefacts from the Indus Valley such as the horned mask from Mohenjo-Daro, the terracotta bull from Kalibangan, and the depiction of a horned deity on a water pitcher from the archaeological site of Kot Diji. She has also noted that the yogic posture of the figure is repeated on a number of other seals and sealings, some of which indicate that the figure receives worship. On the basis of these observations, she suggests that the figure of seal 420 could be a divine buffalo-man.

=== Dravidian Interpretations ===
Scholars who consider the Indus Valley civilisation to be associated with a Dravidian rather than Vedic context have offered other interpretations. Expanding on a mention by D. D. Kosambi in 1962, Alf Hiltebeitel thought the horned figure could be a prototype of Mahishasura, the buffalo demon enemy of the Hindu goddess Durga. He has also argued that the tiger depicted in the seal could relate to the goddess Durga who is often depicted as riding a tiger (or a lion) in the Hindu pantheon. He also suggested that the surrounding animals could represent the vahanas (vehicles, mounts) of deities for the four cardinal directions.

Where Marshall's description had "the head is crowned with the horns of a bull", Hiltebeitel is emphatic that the figure has the very different horns of a buffalo, and that IVC people familiar with both species would not have confused the two species: "One might imagine a "proto-Siva" with bull's horns as a prefiguration of Siva's connection with his vahana or riding vehicle Nandin. But a "proto-Siva" with buffalo's horns would take too much explaining to retain credibility".

The American archaeologist Walter Fairservis tried to translate what he considered to be a Dravidian inscription, and was of the view that the seal could be identified with Anil, the paramount chief of four clans represented by the animals. The Finnish Indologist, Asko Parpola has suggested that the yogic pose could be an imitation of the Proto-Elamite way of representing seated bulls. He attempted to translate the inscription which he considers to be an early form of Dravidian, and found that the figure represents a servant of an aquatic deity. He finds that the animals depicted on the seal best resemble those associated with the Hindu god Varuna who could be associated with the aquatic themes which are prominent in the Indus religion.

=== Vedic Interpretations ===
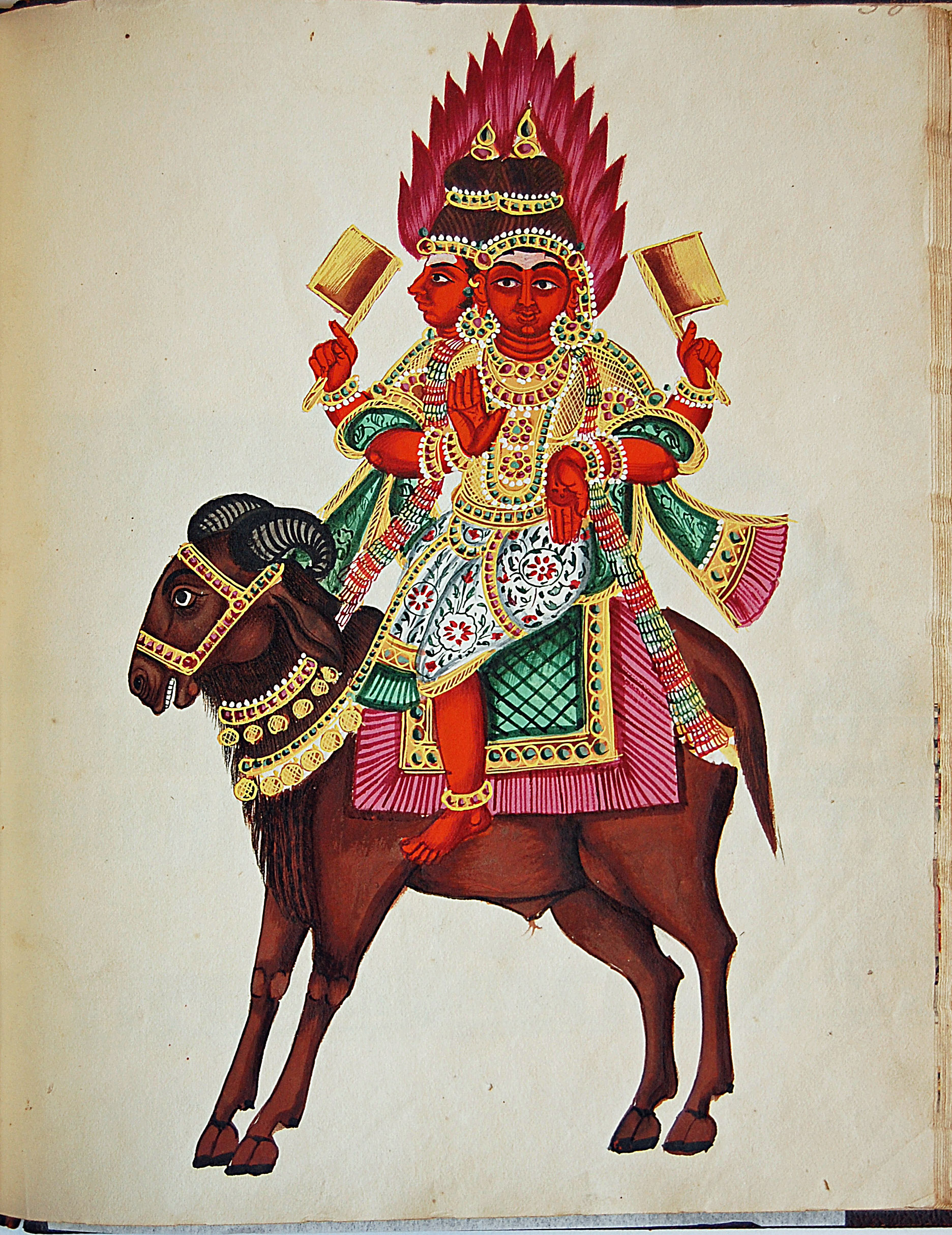
Agni is the god of fire, and a prominent deity in the Vedas

M.V.N. Krishna Rao identified the figure with the Hindu god Indra. He argued that the tiger could be ignored since it is much larger than the other animals, and the two deer could also be ignored since they were seated under the table. Then he combined the first phoneme of each of the animals, and the word 'nara' meaning man, and arrived at the term 'makhanasana' which is an epithet of Indra.

=== Not determinable ===
Some 21st-century scholars have urged caution in interpretation. The American Indologist Wendy Doniger wrote in 2011 that while "several generations of scholars" had taken up Marshall's suggestion, and while there was "a general resemblance" between the figure on the seal and later Hindu images of Shiva, and while the people of the Indus could have had "a symbolism of the divine phallus", all the same "we cannot know it, [and] it does not mean that the Indus images are the source of the Hindu images, or that they had the same meaning." The scholar of religious studies Geoffrey Samuel wrote that the multiple interpretations "certainly cannot all be right". Since, further, there was no obvious method for choosing between the interpretations, and little was known with certainty about Indus Valley religious practices, "the evidence for the yogic or 'Tantric' practices is so dependent on reading later practices into the material that it is of little or no use for constructing any kind of history of [such] practices".

== See also ==
- Gundestrup cauldron
- Cernunnos
- Gutasaga

== Sources ==
- Doniger, Wendy (2011). "God's Body, or, The Lingam Made Flesh: Conflicts over the Representation of the Sexual Body of the Hindu God Shiva". Social Research. 78 (2, Part 1 (Summer 2011)): 485–508. doi:10.1353/sor.2011.0067. JSTOR 23347187. S2CID 170065724.
- Hiltebeitel, Alf (2011). "The Indus Valley "Proto-Śiva", Reexamined through Reflections on the Goddess, the Buffalo, and the Symbolism of vāhanas". In Adluri, Vishwa; Bagchee, Joydeep (eds.). When the Goddess was a Woman: Mahabharata Ethnographies - Essays by Alf Hiltebeitel. BRILL. ISBN 978-90-04-19380-2.
- Kenoyer, J.M., entry by, in: Matthiae, P; Lamberg-Karlovsky, Carl Clifford, Art of the First Cities: The Third Millennium B.C. from the Mediterranean to the Indus, p. 403, 2003, Metropolitan Museum of Art (New York, N.Y.), google books
- Kosambi, Damodar Dharmanand, Myth and Reality: Studies in the Formation of Indian Culture, 1962 (2005 reprint), Popular Prakashan, ISBN 9788171548705, 8171548709, google books
- Mackay, Ernest John Henry (1928–29). "Excavations at Mohenjodaro". Annual Report of the Archaeological Survey of India: 67–75.
- Mackay, Earnest John Henry (1937–38). Further excavations at Mohenjo-Daro : being an official account of archaeological excavations at Mohenjo-Daro carried out by the Government of India between the years 1927 and 1931. Delhi: Government of India.
- McEvilley, Thomas (1981). "An Archaeology of Yoga". RES: Anthropology and Aesthetics. 1 (1): 44–77. doi:10.1086/RESv1n1ms20166655. JSTOR 20166655. S2CID 192221643.
- Marshall, John (1931). Mohenjo-Daro and the Indus Civilization: Being an Official Account of Archaeological Excavations at Mohenjo-Daro Carried Out by the Government of India Between the Years 1922 and 1927. Asian Educational Services. ISBN 978-81-206-1179-5.
- Possehl, Gregory L. (2002). The Indus Civilization: A Contemporary Perspective. Rowman Altamira. ISBN 978-0-7591-1642-9.
- Samuel, Geoffrey (2017) [2008]. The Origins of Yoga and Tantra. Indic Religions to the Thirteenth Century. Cambridge University Press. ISBN 978-0521695343.
- Singh, Kavita, "The Museum Is National", Chapter 4 in: Mathur, Saloni and Singh, Kavita (eds), No Touching, No Spitting, No Praying: The Museum in South Asia, 2015, Routledge, PDF on academia.edu
- Singh, Upinder, A History of Ancient and Early Medieval India: From the Stone Age to the 12th Century, 2008, Pearson Longman, ISBN 9788131716779
- Srinivasan, Doris (1975–76). "The So-Called Proto-śiva Seal from Mohenjo-Daro: An Iconological Assessment". Archives of Asian Art. 29: 47–58. JSTOR 20062578.
- Srinivasan, Doris (1997). Many Heads, Arms, and Eyes: Origin, Meaning, and Form of Multiplicity in Indian Art. Brill. ISBN 9004107584.
- Sullivan, Herbert P. (1964). "A Re-Examination of the Religion of the Indus Civilization". History of Religions. 4 (1): 115–125. doi:10.1086/462498. JSTOR 1061875. S2CID 162278147.
- Werness, Hope B. (2006). Continuum Encyclopedia of Animal Symbolism in World Art. A&C Black. p. 270. ISBN 978-0826419132.
- Witzel, Michael (2008). "Vedas and Upanisads". In Gavin Flood (ed.). The Blackwell Companion to Hinduism. John Wiley & Sons. pp. 68–70. ISBN 978-0-470-99868-7.
