= F. A. Khan =

Pakistani archaeologist (1910–2009)

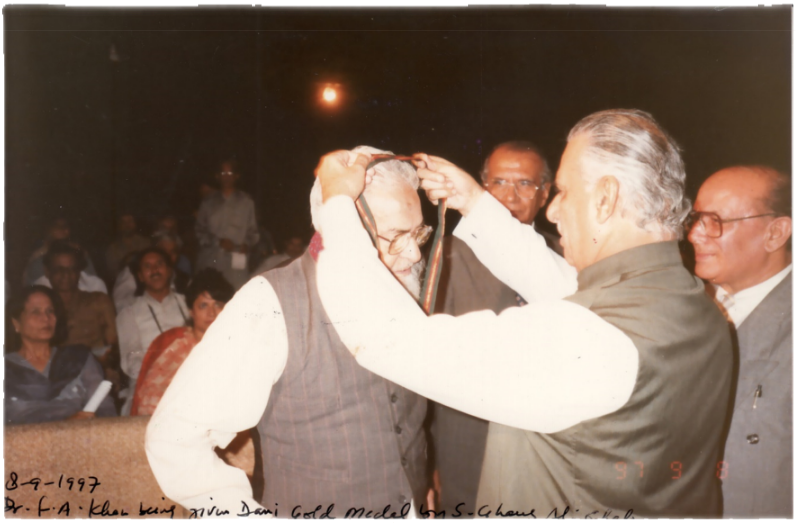
- Khan being awarded the Dani Gold Medal by Syed Ghous Ali Shah, in 1997
- Born: 1 October 1910; Rawalpindi, British India
- Died: 2009 (aged 98–99); P.E.C.H.S, Karachi, Pakistan
- Education: Aligarh Muslim University; University of London
- Occupations: Archaeologist; Professor
- Known for: Director General, Department of Archaeology & Museums (1958–1970)
- Awards: Tamgha-i-Imtiaz (1961); Sitara-i-Imtiaz (1965)

Fazal Ahmad Khan (1 October 1910 – 2009) was a renowned Pakistani archaeologist who served as a Director General of the Department of Archaeology & Museums (DOAM) from 1958 to 1970. He was a student of esteemed archaeologist Mortimer Wheeler.

== Early life ==
Khan was born on 1 October 1910 in Rawalpindi, British India. His father, Hassan Ali Khan, was a distinguished medical professional and one of the first graduates of King Edward Medical College. Hassan Ali Khan served in various locations during the British era, including Baghdad during World War I, earning him the title "Medalist of the First World War." Khan's mother was Nawab Begum.

== Career ==
Khan received his early education in Punjab, followed by MA degrees in History and Geography from Aligarh Muslim University in 1935 and 1938, respectively. Khan joined the Archaeological Survey of India as a Field Scholar for Exploration and Excavation in October 1938. In 1943, he was appointed Custodian of the Archaeological Museum Mohenjo-Daro. The Government of India awarded him a scholarship to study Chinese archaeology at Beijing University for three years in 1947. Later, the Government of Pakistan awarded him a scholarship to pursue higher education in England in 1951, where he completed his PhD in a record time of two years and four months under the supervision of Max Mallowan and V. Gordon Childe at the Institute of Archaeology, University of London. His doctoral dissertation, "An Archaeological Study of the Indus Valley Civilizations and their Relationship to the Early Cultures of Iran," showcased his expertise in the field.

After returning, Khan was appointed Superintendent of the Exploration and Excavation Branch, conducting archaeological excavations at the Arab archaeological site of Banbhore in Sindh and the Buddhist archaeological site of Mainmati in East Pakistan (now Bangladesh). In April 1958, he became Director of the Department of Archaeology, Pakistan, serving until his retirement on September 30, 1970. In 1959, in his capacity as Director of the Department of Archaeology, he wrote the 'Note on a New National Museum of Pakistan' which outlined a plan for the re-organisation of the National Museum of Pakistan in Karachi. Post-retirement, he chaired the Antiquities Acquisition Committee of the National Museum for many years. From 1970 to 1977, he served as Professor of Archaeology at the University of Karachi. In 1974, Khan served as a consultant for UNESCO in Bahrain, Kuwait, Qatar, and the United Arab Emirates.

== Death ==
In 2009, he died at the age of 90 in PECHS colony, Karachi.

== Notable Contributions ==
Khan's work spanned over 25 years, focusing on comparative studies of the Indus Valley civilizations. He also explored archaeological problems of the Hindu, Buddhist, and Muslim periods. His notable excavations include:

- Kot Diji (1955–1957): He excavated this fortified city, dating back to the Indus Valley Civilization.
- Banbhore (1957–1965), The excavations carried out by the F. A. Khan revealed important architectural and archaeological remains of a pre-Islamic and Islamic settlement.
- Mainamati (1962–1963): Khan led extensive excavations at Mainamati (East Pakistan), uncovering numerous Buddhist viharas, temples, and other structures dating back to the 7th-10th centuries AD.

== Awards and honours ==
Khan received numerous honors, including the Tamga-i-Pakistan (1961), Sitara-i-Imtiaz (1965), France's highest honor, and Italy's high honor (1982). He was awarded the 1996 Dani Gold Medal by the Pakistan Society of Archaeology, Archives and Museums on July 31, 1997. The library of the Women's University, Lahore, is named after him.
