= Mohenjo-daro =

Archaeological site in Sindh, Pakistan

- The site in 2014

- Location within Sindh Location within Pakistan Location within South Asia
- 27°19′45″N 68°08′20″E
- Type: Settlement
- Cultures: Indus Valley Civilisation
- Location: Larkana District, Sindh, Pakistan

History
- Built: c. 2500 BC
- Abandoned: c. 1700 BC

Site notes
- Area: 250 ha (620 acres)

UNESCO World Heritage Site
- Official name: Archaeological Ruins at Moenjodaro
- Criteria: Cultural: ii, iii
- Reference: 138
- Inscription: 1980 (4th Session)
- Area: 240 ha (590 acres)

Mohenjo-daro (/moʊˌhɛndʒoʊ ˈdɑːroʊ/; Sindhi: موهن جو دڙو, lit. 'Mound of the Dead Men'; Urdu: موئن جو دڑو [muˑənⁱ dʑoˑ d̪əɽoˑ]) is an archaeological site in the Larkana District of Sindh, Pakistan. Built c. 2500 BCE, it was one of the largest settlements of the ancient Indus Valley Civilisation, and one of the world's earliest major cities, contemporaneous with the civilisations of ancient Egypt, Mesopotamia, Minoa, and Norte Chico.

With an estimated population of at least 40,000 people, Mohenjo-daro prospered for several centuries, but by c. 1700 BCE had been abandoned, along with other large cities of the Indus Valley Civilisation.

The site was rediscovered in the 1920s. Significant excavation has since been conducted at the site of the city, which was designated a UNESCO World Heritage Site in 1980, the first site in South Asia to be so designated. The site is currently threatened by erosion and improper restoration.

== Etymology ==
The city's original name is unknown. Based on his analysis of a Mohenjo-daro seal, Iravatham Mahadevan speculates that the city's ancient name could have been Kukkuṭārma ("the city [-rma] of the cockerel [kukkuta]"). Cock-fighting may have had ritual and religious significance for the city. Mohenjo-daro may also have been a point of diffusion for the clade of the domesticated chicken found in Africa, Western Asia, Europe and the Americas.

Mohenjo-daro, the modern name for the site, has been interpreted as "Mound of the Dead" in Sindhi.

== Location ==
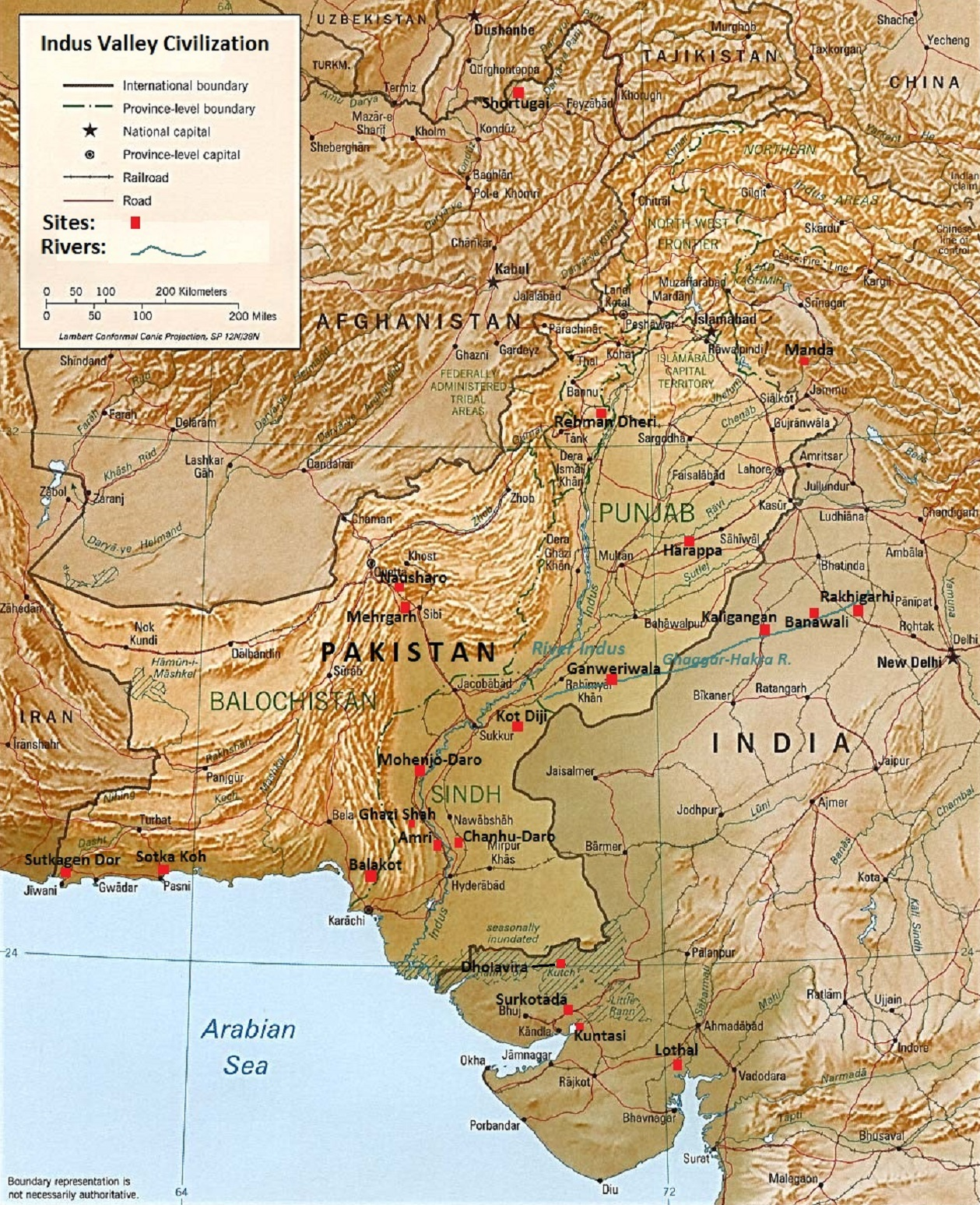
Map showing the major sites and theorised extent of the Indus Valley Civilisation, including the location of the Mohenjo-daro site

Mohenjo-daro is located off the right (west) bank of the lower (Note: "Lower Indus" refers to the portion of the river below its confluence with Panjnad, the combined river of all its five tributaries flowing through the Punjab region.) Indus river in Larkana District, Sindh, Pakistan. It lies on a Pleistocene ridge in the flood plain of the Indus, around 28 kilometres (17 mi) from the town of Larkana.

== Historical context ==
Mohenjo-daro was built around 2500 BCE. It was one of the largest cities of the ancient Indus Valley Civilisation, also known as the Harappan Civilisation, which developed c. 3000 BC from the prehistoric Indus culture. At its height, the Indus Civilisation spanned much of what is now Pakistan and North India, extending westwards to the Iranian border, south to Gujarat in India and northwards to an outpost in Bactria, with major urban centers at Harappa, Mohenjo-daro, Lothal, Kalibangan, Dholavira, and Rakhigarhi. Mohenjo-daro was the most advanced city of its time, with remarkably sophisticated civil engineering and urban planning. When the Indus civilisation went into sudden decline c. 1700 BCE, Mohenjo-daro was abandoned.

== Rediscovery and excavation ==
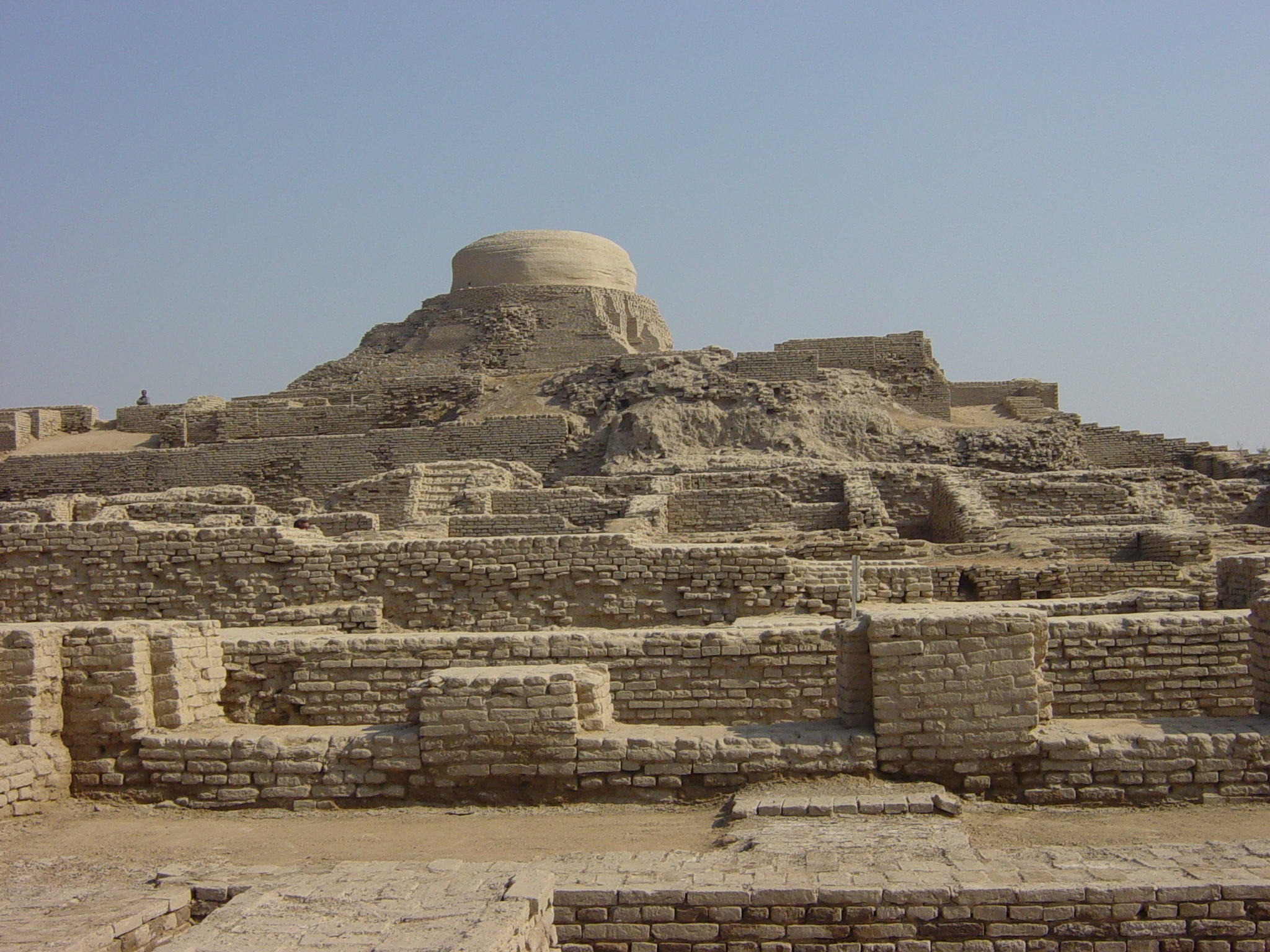
Archaeological ruins at Moenjodaro

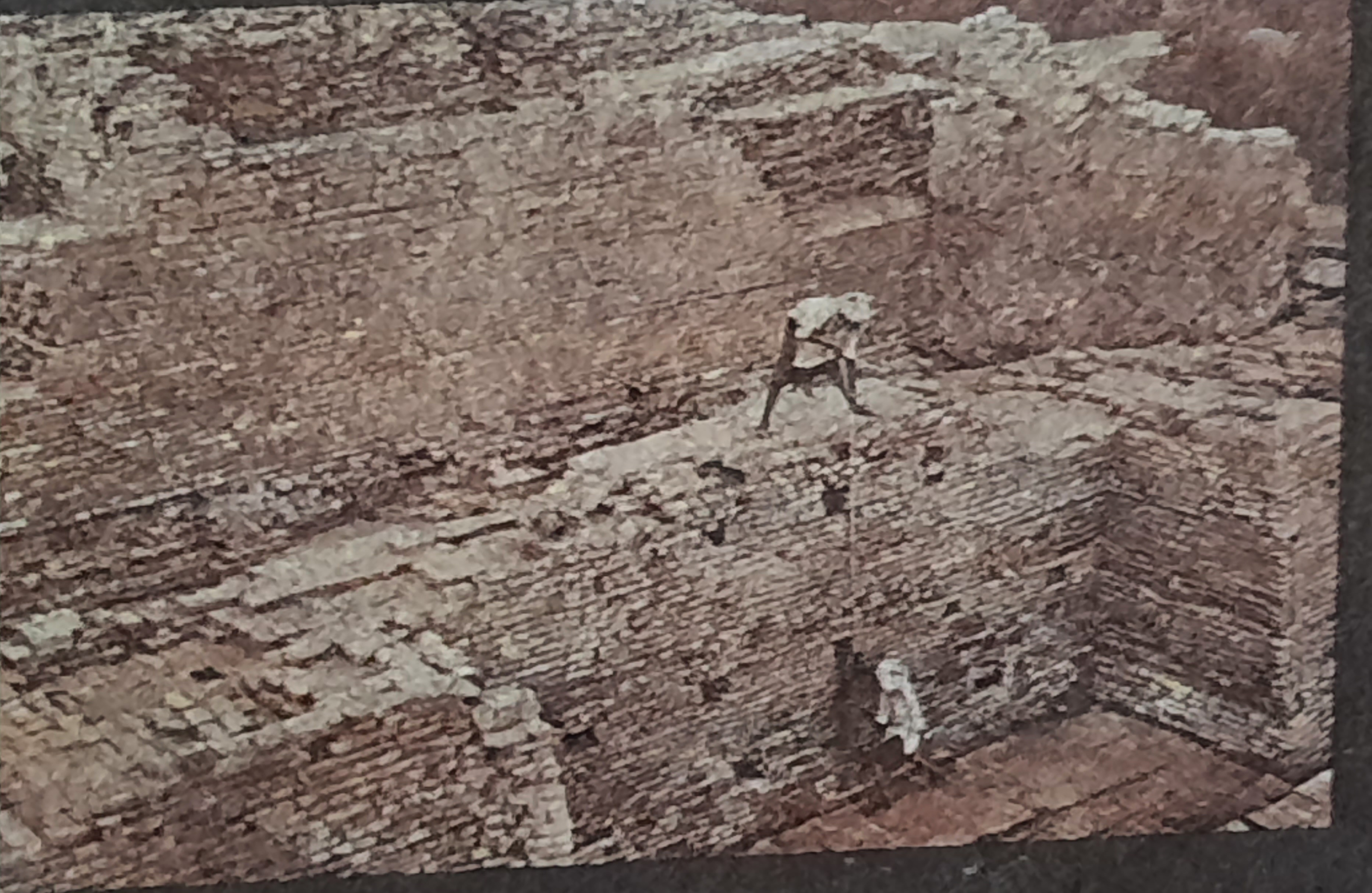
Excavations at Mohenjo-daro in 1924

The ruins of the city remained undocumented for around 3,700 years until R. D. Banerji, an officer of the Archaeological Survey of India, visited the site in 1919–1920 identifying what he thought to be a Buddhist stupa (150–500 CE) known to be there and finding a flint scraper which convinced him of the site's antiquity. This led to large-scale excavations of Mohenjo-daro led by Kashinath Dikshit in 1924–1925, and John Marshall in 1925–1926. In the 1930s, major excavations were conducted at the site under the leadership of Marshall, D. K. Dikshitar and Ernest Mackay. Further excavations were carried out in 1945 by Mortimer Wheeler and his trainee, Ahmad Dani and F. A. Khan. The last major series of excavations were conducted in 1964 and 1965 by George Dales. After 1965, excavations were banned due to weathering damage to the exposed structures, and the only projects allowed at the site since have been salvage excavations, surface surveys, and conservation projects. In the 1980s, German and Italian survey groups led by Michael Jansen and Maurizio Tosi used less invasive archeological techniques, such as architectural documentation, surface surveys, and localized probing, to gather further information about Mohenjo-daro. A dry core drilling conducted in 2015 by Pakistan's National Fund for Mohenjo-daro revealed that the site is larger than the unearthed area.

== Architecture and urban infrastructure ==
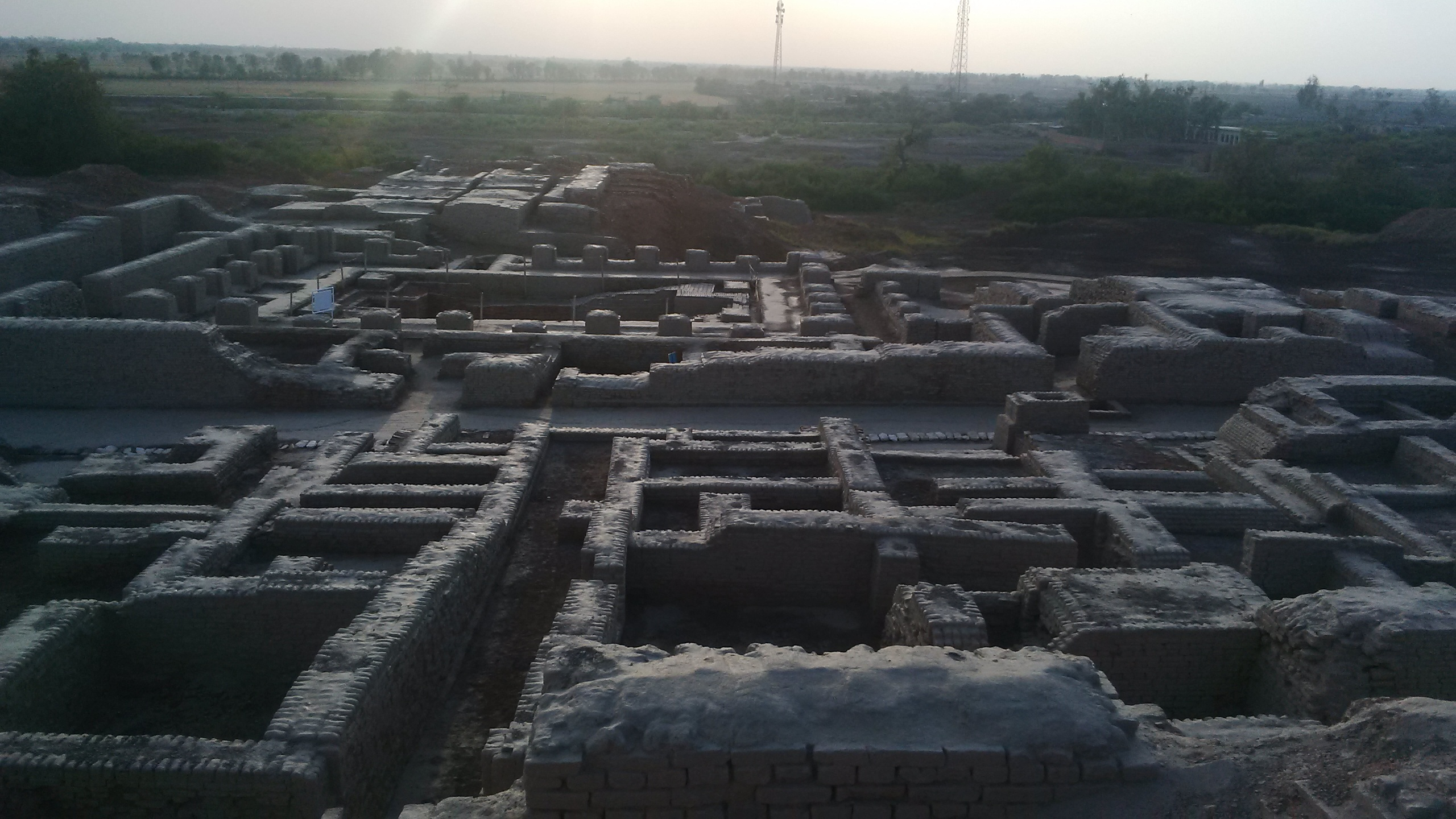
Regularity of streets and buildings suggests the influence of ancient urban planning in Mohenjo-daro's construction

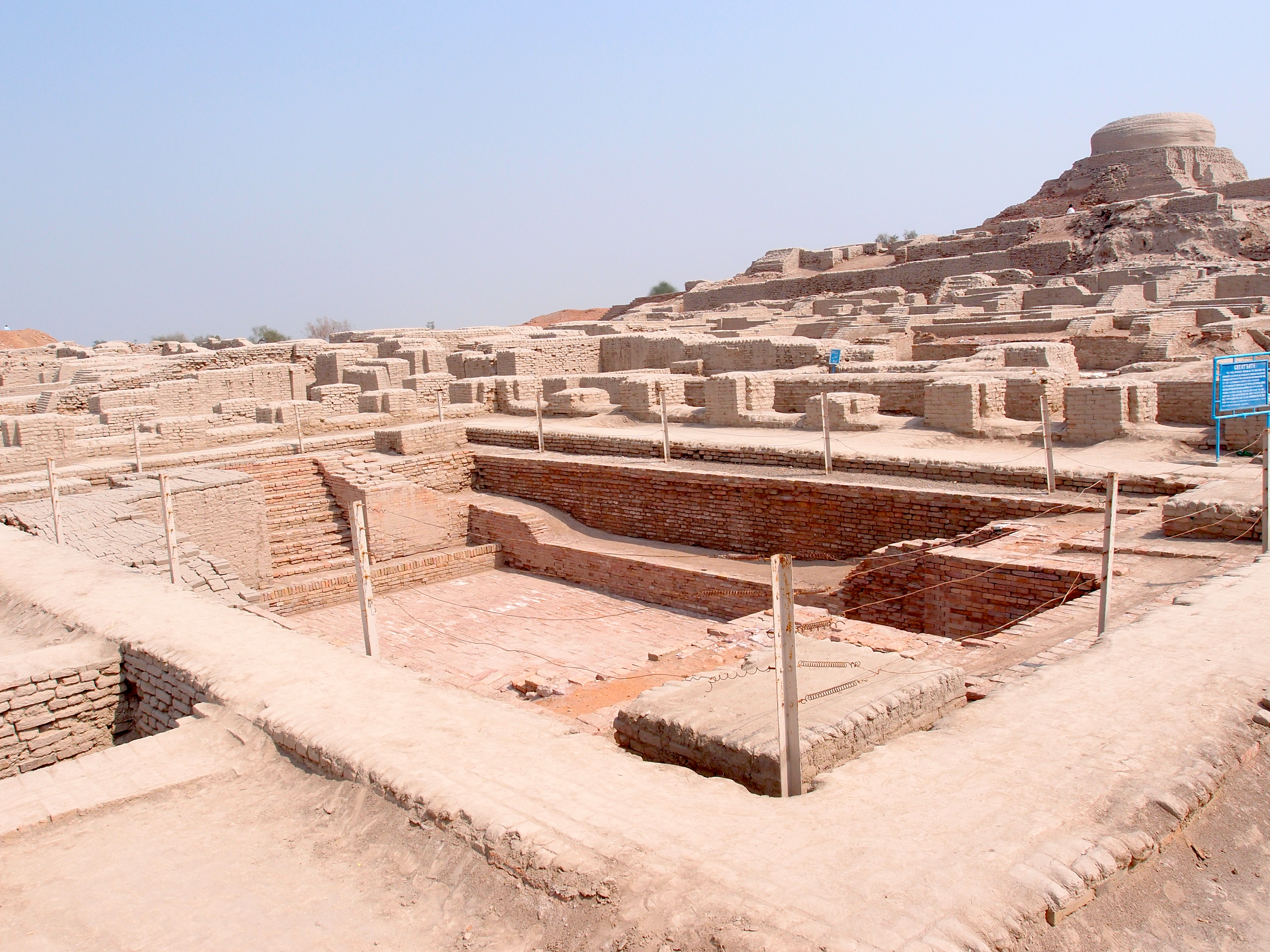
View of the site's Great Bath, showing the surrounding urban layout

Mohenjo-daro has a planned layout with rectilinear buildings arranged on a grid plan. Most were built of fired and mortared brick; some incorporated sun-dried mud-brick and wooden superstructures. The covered area of Mohenjo-daro is estimated at 300 hectares. The Oxford Handbook of Cities in World History offers a "weak" estimate of a peak population of around 40,000. (Note: Peter Clark (editor), The Oxford Handbook of Cities in World History, Oxford University Press, 2013, pp. 158–59; "since it is impossible to ascertain what proportion of the city was used for habitation the basis for this [population] estimate is weak." For lower area estimate of 85 hectares, see note 25, citing U. Singh, A History of Ancient and Medieval India, Delhi, Pearson Education, 2008, p. 149. See also FR Alchin and G Erdosy, The Archaeology of Early Historic Asia: The Emergence of Cities and States, Cambridge University Press, 1995, p. 57.)

The sheer size of the city, and its provision of public buildings and facilities, suggests a high level of social organisation. (Note: McIntosh (2008), p. 389. "The enormous amount of labor involved in the creation of Mohenjo-daro's flood defense platforms (calculated at around 4 million man-days) indicates the existence of an authority able to plan the construction and to mobilize and feed the requisite labor force.") The city is divided into two parts, the so-called Citadel and the Lower City. The Citadel – a mud-brick mound around 12 metres (39 ft) high – is known to have supported public baths, a large residential structure designed to house about 5,000 citizens, and two large assembly halls. The city had a large central well with an entrance doorway that opened to the city's main street; thus, this well was used by the general public. Individual households or groups of households obtained their water from smaller wells. Waste water was channeled to covered drains that lined the major streets. Some houses, presumably those of more prestigious inhabitants, include rooms that appear to have been set aside for bathing, and one building had an underground furnace (known as a hypocaust), possibly for heated bathing. Most houses had inner courtyards, with doors that opened onto side-lanes. Some buildings had two stories. Due to repeated flooding, efforts were made to create raised mud-brick platforms during periods of reconstruction as means to elevate the city's structures and provide protection against future flooding.

=== Major buildings ===
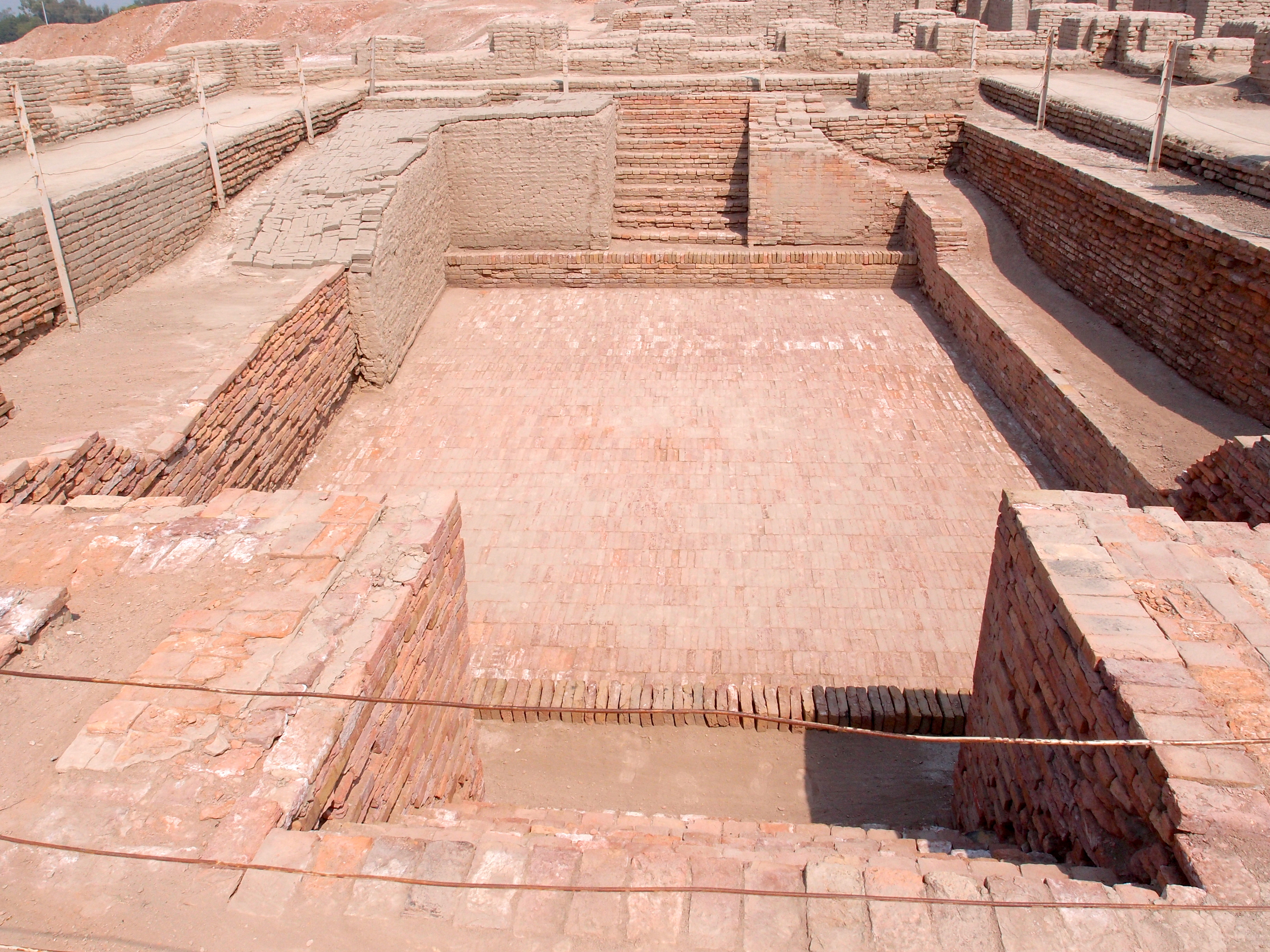
The Great Bath

In 1950, Sir Mortimer Wheeler identified one large building in Mohenjo-daro as a "Great Granary". Certain wall-divisions in its massive wooden superstructure appeared to be grain storage-bays, complete with air-ducts to dry the grain. According to Wheeler, carts would have brought grain from the countryside and unloaded them directly into the bays. However, Jonathan Mark Kenoyer noted the complete lack of evidence for grain at the "granary", which, he argued, might therefore be better termed a "Great Hall" of uncertain function.

Close to the "Great Granary" is a large and elaborate public bath, sometimes called the "Great Bath". From a colonnaded courtyard, steps lead down to the brick-built pool, which was waterproofed by a lining of bitumen. The pool measures 12 metres (39 ft) long, 7 metres (23 ft) wide and 2.4 metres (7.9 ft) deep. It may have been used for religious purification. Just north of the "Great Bath" is a smaller, private structure containing 8 bathrooms and a staircase to an uper level. It is believed that these bathrooms were reserved for priests who lived on the level above, and the "Great Bath" was used by the wider public.

Other large buildings include a "Pillared Hall", thought to be an assembly hall of some kind, and the so-called "College Hall", thought to have been a priestly residence. The "College Hall" consisted of several rooms and was multi-leveled. The combination of potentially religious and administrative buildings further frames Mohenjo-daro as a developed urban city.

=== Fortifications ===
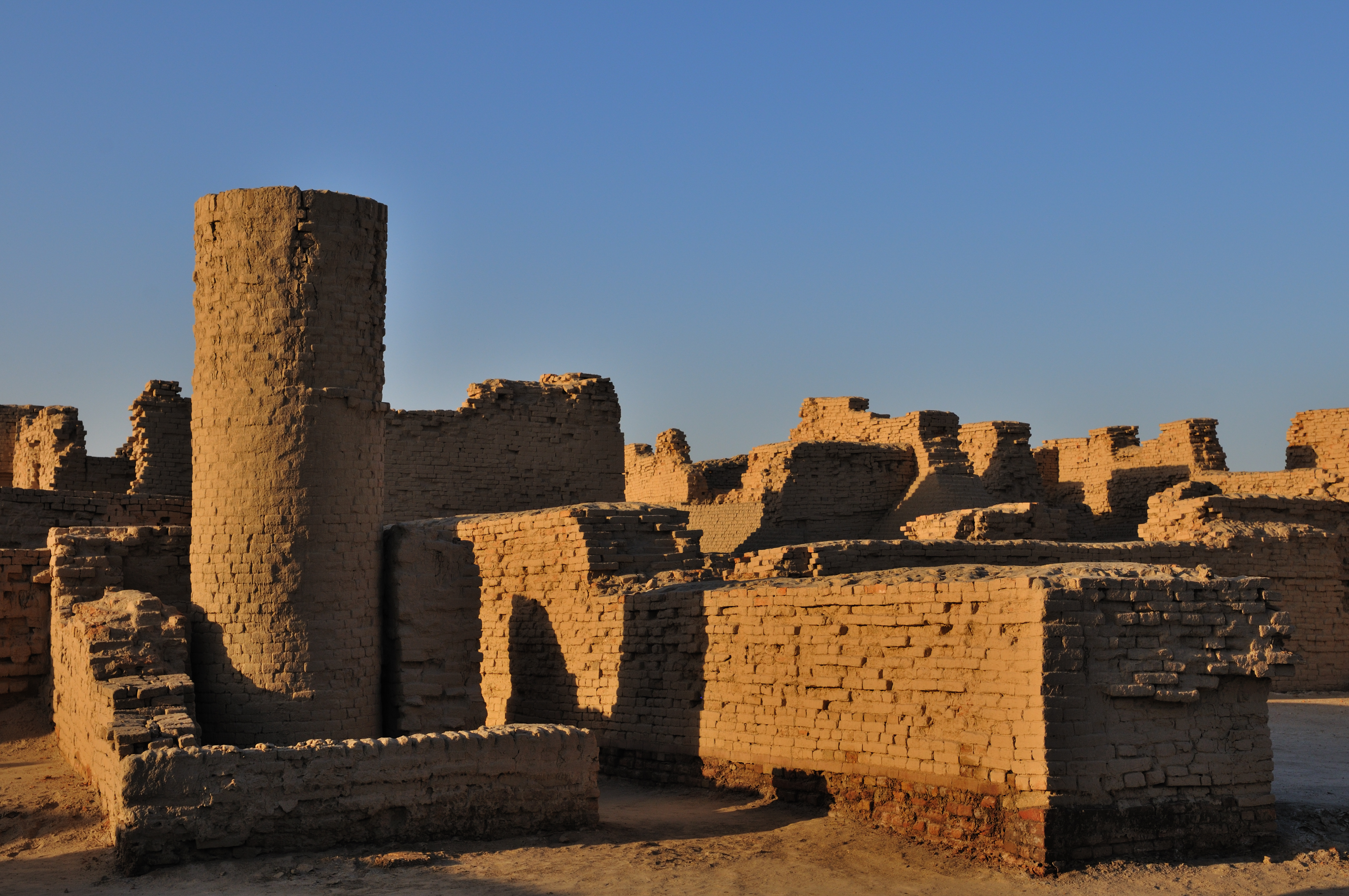
Excavation of the city revealed very tall wells (left), which it seems were continually built up as flooding and rebuilding raised the elevation of street level (Note: McIntosh (2008), p. 118. "More than seven hundred wells were sunk at Mohenjo-daro when the city was built. Over the centuries houses were rebuilt and street levels rose; new courses of bricks were therefore added to the wells to keep their tops at the same height with respect to the street. The removal of earth and debris during the excavation of the city has left many wells standing like towers high above the exposed remnants of earlier streets.")

Archaeologists have identified the foundations of eroded mud-brick walls that surrounded Mohenjo-daro. It was also fortified with guard towers to the west of the main settlement, and defensive fortifications to the south. Based on these fortifications and the structure of other major Indus Valley cities such as Harappa, scholars have postulated that Mohenjo-daro was an administrative center. Harappa and Mohenjo-daro share a similar architectural layout and were generally not as heavily fortified as other Indus Valley sites. It is obvious from the identical city layouts of all Indus sites that there was some kind of political or administrative centrality, but the extent and functioning of an administrative center remains unclear.

=== Water supply and wells ===
The location of Mohenjo-daro was built in a relatively short period of time, with the water supply system and wells being some of the first planned constructions. With the excavations done so far, over 700 wells are present at Mohenjo-daro, alongside drainage and bathing systems. This number is unheard of when compared to other civilisations at the time, such as Egypt or Mesopotamia, and the quantity of wells transcribes as one well for every three houses. Because of the large number of wells, it is believed that the inhabitants relied solely on annual rainfall, as well as the Indus River's course remaining close to the site, alongside the wells providing water for long periods of time in the case of the city coming under siege. Due to the period in which these wells were built and used, it is likely that the circular brick well design used at this and many other Harappan sites are an invention that should be credited to the Indus civilisation, as there is no existing evidence of this design from Mesopotamia or Egypt at this time, and even later. Sewage and waste water for buildings at the site were disposed of via a centralized drainage system that ran alongside the site's streets. These drains that ran alongside the road were effective at allowing most human waste and sewage to be disposed of as the drains most likely took the waste toward the Indus River.

=== Flooding and rebuilding ===
The city also had large platforms perhaps intended as defense against flooding. According to a theory first advanced by Wheeler, the city could have been flooded and silted over, perhaps six times, and later rebuilt in the same location. Some archaeologists believed that the site was abandoned after a final flood engulfed the city in a sea of mud. Gregory Possehl was the first to theorize that the floods were caused by overuse and expansion upon the land, and that the mud flood was not the reason the site was abandoned. Instead of a mud flood wiping part of the city out in one fell swoop, Possehl coined the possibility of constant mini-floods throughout the year, paired with the land being worn out by crops, pastures, and resources for bricks and pottery spelled the downfall of the site.

== Notable artefacts ==
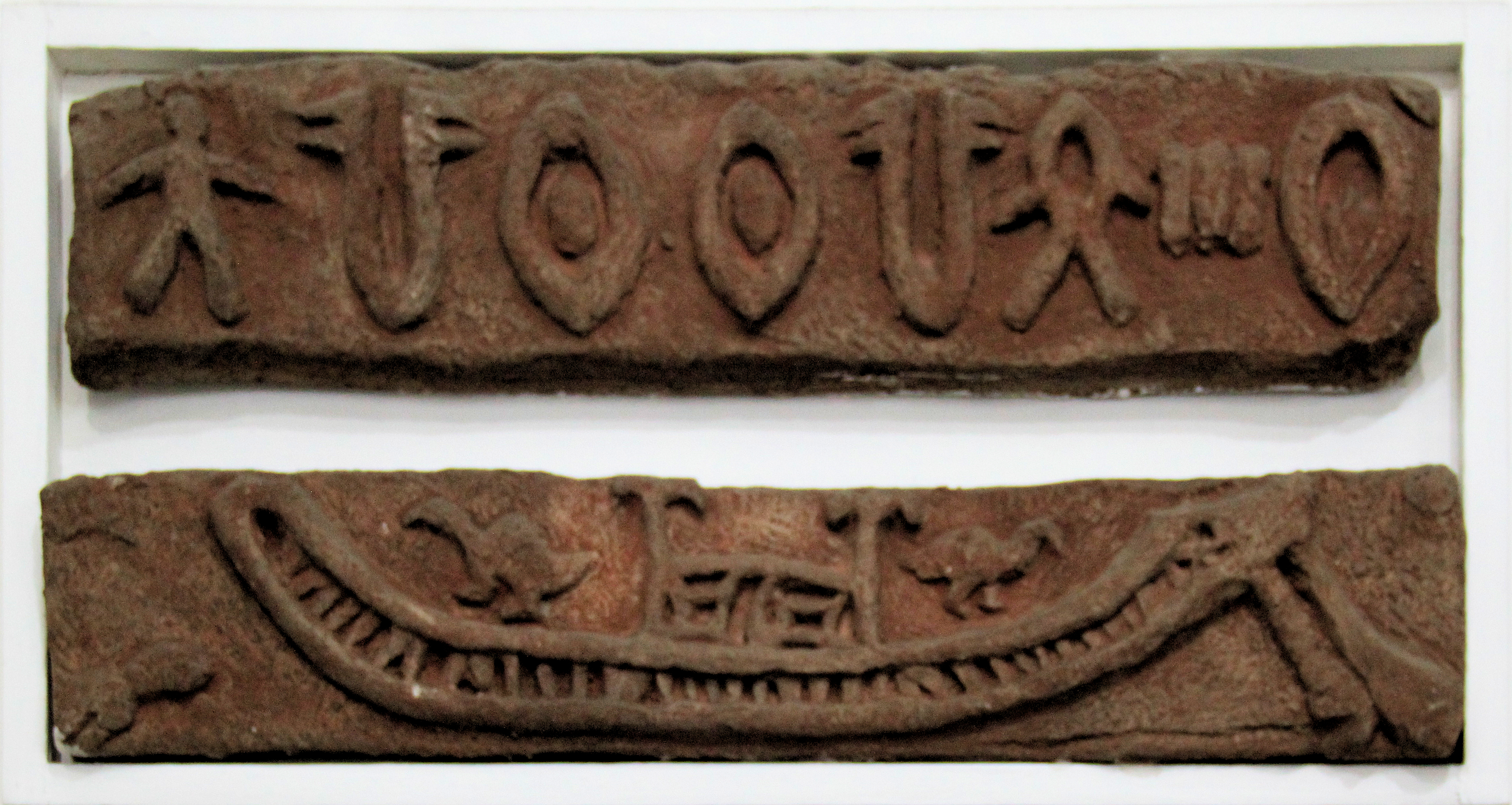
Boat with direction finding birds to find land. Model of Mohenjo-Daro seal, 2500–1750 BC

Numerous objects found in excavation include seated and standing figures, copper and stone tools, carved seals, balance-scales and weights, gold and jasper jewellery, and children's toys. Many bronze and copper pieces, such as figurines and bowls, have been recovered from the site, showing that the inhabitants of Mohenjo-daro understood how to utilize the lost wax technique. The furnaces found at the site are believed to have been used for copperworks and melting the metals as opposed to smelting. There even seems to be an entire section of the city dedicated to shell-working, located in the northeastern part of the site. Some of the most prominent copperworks recovered from the site are the copper tablets which have examples of the untranslated Indus script and iconography. While the script has not been deciphered yet, many of the images on the tablets match another tablet and both hold the same caption in the Indus language, with the example given showing three tablets with the image of a mountain goat and the inscription on the back reading the same letters for the three tablets.

Pottery and terracotta sherds have been recovered from the site, with many of the pots having deposits of ash in them, leading archeologists to believe they were either used to hold the ashes of a person or as a way to warm up a home located in the site. These heaters, or braziers, were ways to heat the house while also being able to be utilized in a manner of cooking or straining, while others solely believe they were used for heating.

The finds from Mohenjo-daro were initially deposited in the Lahore Museum, but later moved to the ASI headquarters at New Delhi, where a new "Central Imperial Museum" was being planned for the new capital of the British Raj, in which at least a selection would be displayed. It became apparent that Indian independence was approaching, but the Partition of India was not anticipated until late in the process. The new Pakistani authorities requested the return of the Harappan pieces excavated on their territory, but the Indian authorities refused. Eventually an agreement was reached, whereby the finds, totalling some 12,000 objects (most sherds of pottery), were split equally between the countries; in some cases this was taken very literally, with some necklaces and girdles having their beads separated into two piles. In the case of the "two most celebrated sculpted figures", Pakistan asked for and received the Priest-king, while India retained the much smaller Dancing Girl, and also the Pashupati seal.

Most of the objects from Mohenjo-daro retained by India are in the National Museum of India in New Delhi and those returned to Pakistan in the National Museum of Pakistan in Karachi, with many also in the museum now established at Mohenjo-daro itself. In 1939, a small representative group of artefacts excavated at the site was transferred to the British Museum by the Director-General of the Archaeological Survey of India.

=== Mother Goddess Idol ===
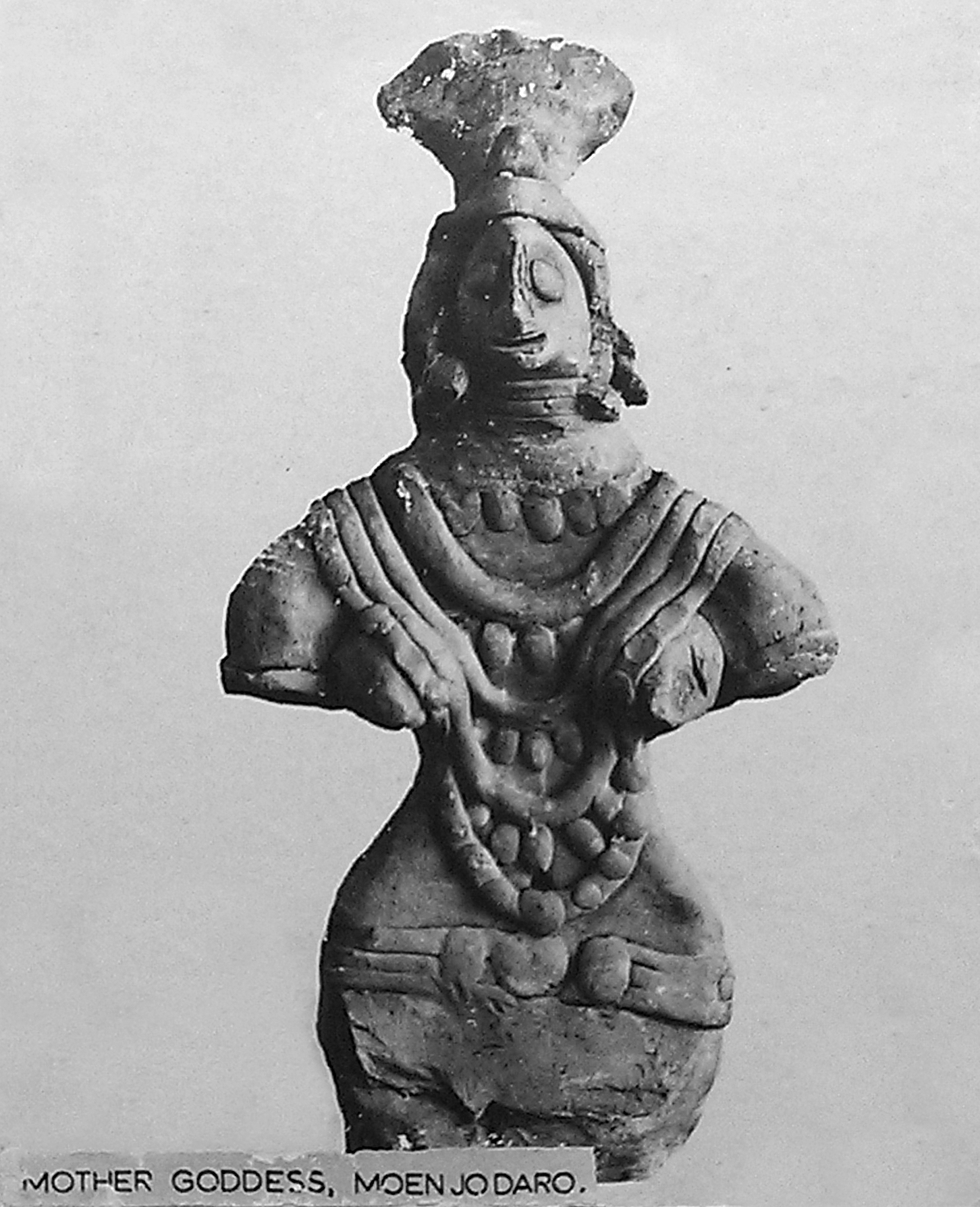
"The Mother Goddess"

Discovered by John Marshall in 1931, the idol appears to mimic certain characteristics that match the Mother Goddess belief common in many early Near East civilisations. Sculptures and figurines depicting women have been observed as part of Harappan culture and religion, as multiple female pieces were recovered from Marshall's archaeological digs. These figures were not categorized correctly, according to Marshall, meaning that where they were recovered from the site is not actually clear. One of said figures is 18.7 cm tall and is currently on display at the National Museum of Pakistan, in Karachi. The fertility and motherhood aspects on display on the idols is represented by the female genitalia that is presented in an almost exaggerated style as stated by Marshall, with him inferring that such figurines are offerings to the goddess, as opposed to the typical understanding of them being idols representing the goddess's likeness. Because of the figurines being unique in terms of hairstyles, body proportions, as well as headdresses and jewelry, there are theories as to who these figurines actually represent. Shereen Ratnagar theorizes that because of their uniqueness and dispersed discovery throughout the site that they could be figurines of ordinary household women, who commissioned these pieces to be used in rituals or healing ceremonies to help aforementioned individual women.

Many more female terra-cotta figurines were discovered by John Marshal. Some figurines depict domestic activities such as kneading bread or holding cake, believed to be toys. Other figurines depict bearing children or pregnancy, believed to be ex-voto offerings for fertility.

=== Dancing Girl ===
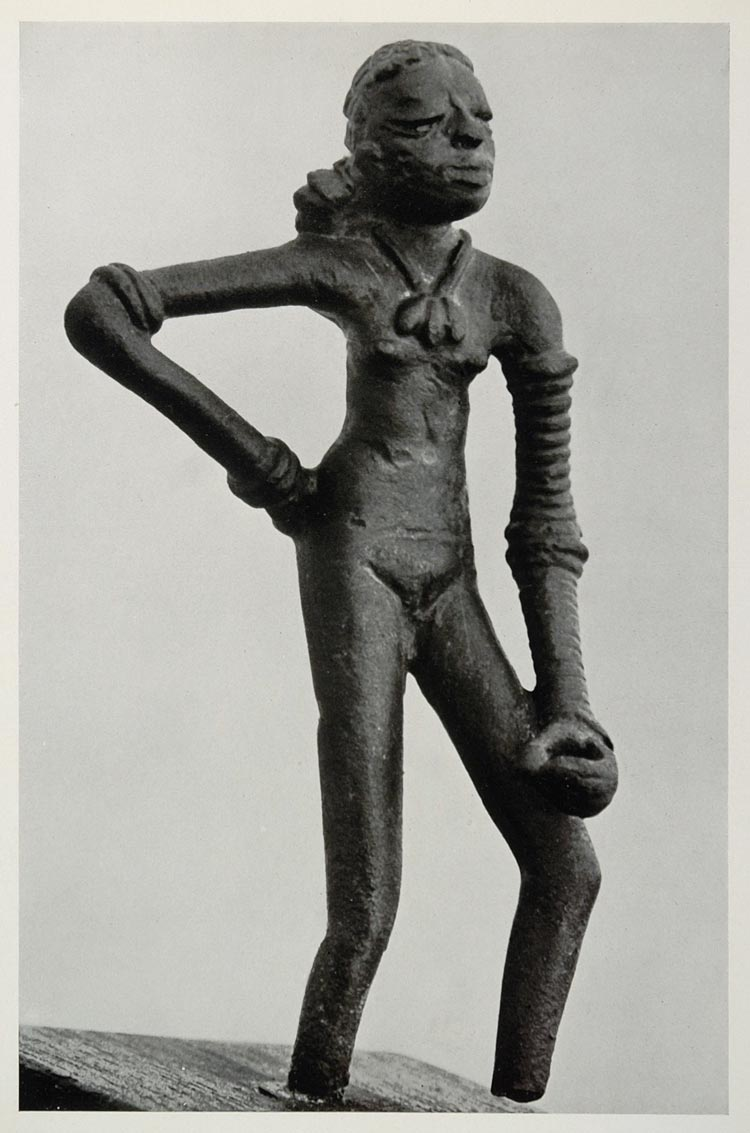
"The Dancing Girl"

A bronze statuette dubbed the "Dancing Girl", 10.5 centimetres (4.1 in) high and around 4,000 years old, was found in 'HR area' of Mohenjo-daro in 1926; it is now in the National Museum, New Delhi. In 1973, British archaeologist Mortimer Wheeler described the item as his favourite statuette:

She's about fifteen years old I should think, not more, but she stands there with bangles all the way up her arm and nothing else on. A girl perfectly, for the moment, perfectly confident of herself and the world. There's nothing like her, I think, in the world.

John Marshall, another archeologist at Mohenjo-daro, described the figure as "a young girl, her hand on her hip in a half-impudent posture, and legs slightly forward as she beats time to the music with her legs and feet." The archaeologist Gregory Possehl said of the statuette, "We may not be certain that she was a dancer, but she was good at what she did and she knew it." The statue led to two important discoveries about the civilisation: first, that they knew metal blending, casting and other sophisticated methods of working with ore, and secondly that entertainment, especially dance, was part of the culture.

=== Priest-King ===
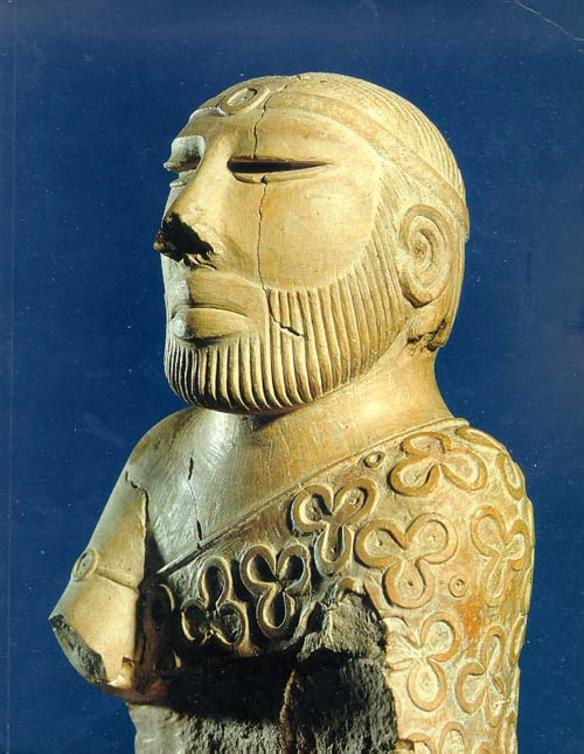
"The Priest-King", a seated stone sculpture at the National Museum, Karachi

In 1927, a seated male soapstone figure was found in a building with unusually ornamental brickwork and a wall-niche. Though there is no evidence that priests or monarchs ruled Mohenjo-daro, archaeologists dubbed this dignified figure a "Priest-King". The sculpture is 17.5 centimetres (6.9 in) tall, and shows a neatly bearded man with pierced earlobes and a fillet around his head, possibly all that is left of a once-elaborate hairstyle or head-dress; his hair is combed back. He wears an armband, and a cloak with drilled trefoil, single circle and double circle motifs, which show traces of red. His eyes might have originally been inlaid.

=== Pashupati seal ===
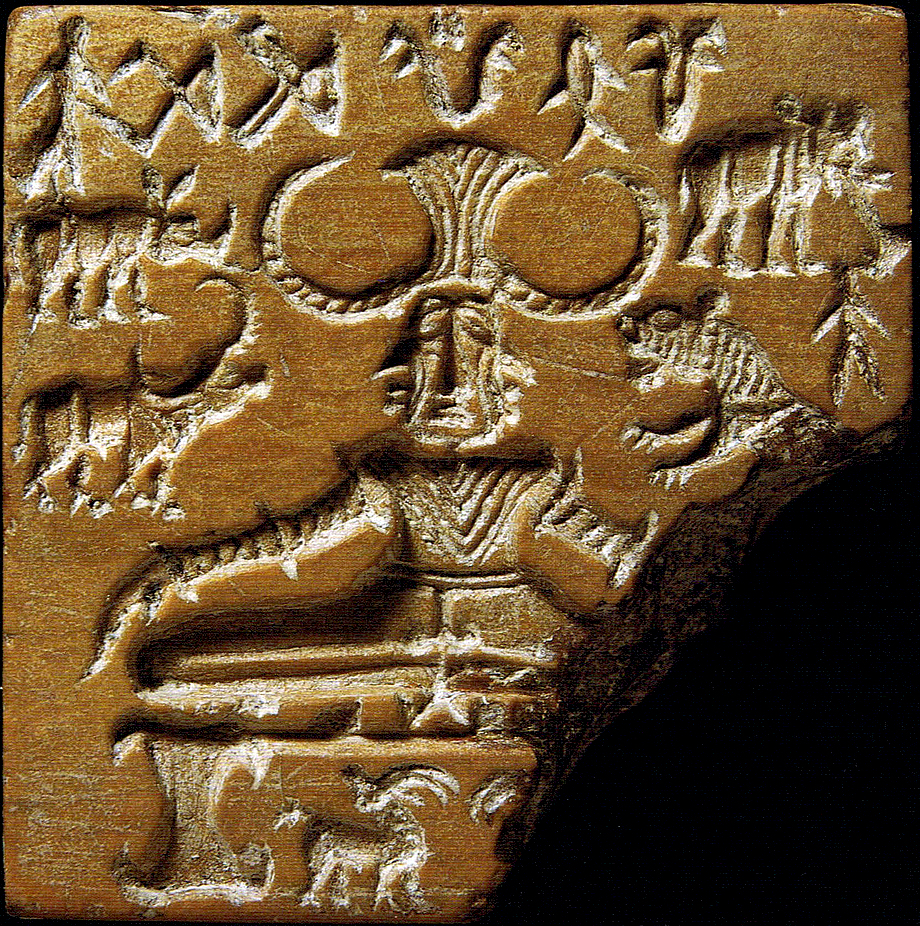
The Pashupati seal

A seal discovered at the site bears the image of a seated, cross-legged and possibly ithyphallic figure surrounded by animals. The figure has been interpreted by some scholars as a yogi, and by others as a three-headed "proto-Shiva" as "Lord of Animals".

=== Seven-stranded necklace ===
Sir Mortimer Wheeler was especially fascinated with this artifact, which he believed to be at least 4,500 years old. The necklace has an S-shaped clasp with seven strands, each over 4 ft long, of bronze-metal bead-like nuggets which connect each arm of the "S" in filigree. Each strand has between 220 and 230 of the many-faceted nuggets, and there are about 1,600 nuggets in total. The necklace weighs about 250 grams in total, and is presently held in a private collection in India.

=== The Mohenjo-daro ruler ===
The Indus Valley civilisation employed rulers made of ivory for measuring length circa 1500 BC. The Mohenjo-Daro ruler is divided into units corresponding to 34 millimetres (1.32 in) and these are further marked in decimal subdivisions with great accuracy, to within 0.13 mm (0.005 in). A ruler found at Lothal (2400 BCE) is calibrated to about 1.6 mm (1/16 in). The decimal subdivision on the ruler is noteworthy, as it predates the modern metric system by 3,000 years or more. The base unit used was known as the angula (finger) and is about 17 mm. A piece of shell found in Mackay's excavation is very precisely incised with lines spaced 6.7 mm (0.264 in) apart. Ancient bricks found throughout the region have dimensions that correspond to these units.

== Conservation and current state ==
An initial agreement to fund restoration was agreed through UNESCO in Paris on 27 May 1980. Contributions were made by a number of other countries to the project:

Country	Contribution US$
Australia	$62,650
Bahrain	$3,000
Cameroon	$1,000
Egypt	$63,889.60
Germany	$375,939.85
India	$49,494.95
Iraq	$9,781
Japan	$200,000
Kuwait	$3,000
Malta	$275.82
Mauritius	$2,072.50
Nigeria	$8,130
Saudi Arabia	$58,993.63
Sri Lanka	$1,562.50
Tanzania	$1,000

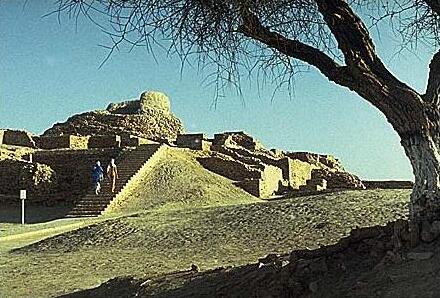
Surviving structures at Mohenjo-daro, 2005

Preservation work for Mohenjo-daro was suspended in December 1996 after funding from the Pakistani government and international organizations stopped. Site conservation work resumed in April 1997, using funds made available by the UNESCO. The 20-year funding plan provided $10 million to protect the site and standing structures from flooding. In 2011, responsibility for the preservation of the site was transferred to the government of Sindh.

Currently the site is threatened by groundwater salinity and improper restoration. Many walls have already collapsed, while others are crumbling from the ground up. In 2012, Pakistani archaeologists warned that, without improved conservation measures, the site could disappear by 2030.

=== 2014 Sindh Festival ===
The Mohenjo-daro site was further threatened in January 2014, when Bilawal Bhutto Zardari of the Pakistan People's Party chose the site for Sindh Festival's inauguration ceremony. This would have exposed the site to mechanical operations, including excavation and drilling. Farzand Masih, head of the Department of Archaeology at Punjab University warned that such activity was banned under the Antiquity Act, saying "You cannot even hammer a nail at an archaeological site." On 31 January 2014, a case was filed in the Sindh High Court to bar the Sindh government from continuing with the event. The festival was held by PPP at the historic site, despite all the protest by both national and international historians and educators.

== Climate ==
Mohenjo-daro has a hot desert climate (Köppen climate classification BWh) with extremely hot summers and mild winters. The highest recorded temperature is 53.5 °C (128.3 °F), recorded in May 2010 and the lowest recorded temperature is −5.4 °C (22.3 °F), recorded in January 2006. Rainfall is low, and mainly occurs in the monsoon season (July–September). The average annual rainfall of Mohenjo-daro is 100.1 mm and mainly occurs in the monsoon season. The highest annual rainfall ever is 1023.8 mm, recorded in 2022, and the lowest annual rainfall ever is 10 mm, recorded in 1987.

Climate data for Mohenjo-daro
Month	Jan	Feb	Mar	Apr	May	Jun	Jul	Aug	Sep	Oct	Nov	Dec	Year
Record high °C (°F)	29.4 (84.9)	36.5 (97.7)	45.5 (113.9)	48.5 (119.3)	53.5 (128.3)	51.7 (125.1)	47.6 (117.7)	46.0 (114.8)	43.5 (110.3)	41.5 (106.7)	39.2 (102.6)	30.6 (87.1)	53.5 (128.3)
Mean daily maximum °C (°F)	24.8 (76.6)	26.2 (79.2)	32.1 (89.8)	38.7 (101.7)	43.8 (110.8)	44.2 (111.6)	41.9 (107.4)	38.7 (101.7)	37.5 (99.5)	35.2 (95.4)	30.5 (86.9)	24.8 (76.6)	34.9 (94.8)
Daily mean °C (°F)	16.0 (60.8)	17.0 (62.6)	22.7 (72.9)	28.8 (83.8)	33.9 (93.0)	35.8 (96.4)	34.4 (93.9)	32.8 (91.0)	31.1 (88.0)	26.7 (80.1)	21.1 (70.0)	16.0 (60.8)	26.4 (79.4)
Mean daily minimum °C (°F)	7.3 (45.1)	7.9 (46.2)	13.3 (55.9)	18.9 (66.0)	24.0 (75.2)	27.4 (81.3)	27.9 (82.2)	27.0 (80.6)	24.7 (76.5)	18.2 (64.8)	11.8 (53.2)	7.3 (45.1)	18.0 (64.3)
Record low °C (°F)	−5.4 (22.3)	−4.0 (24.8)	2.2 (36.0)	3.0 (37.4)	13.0 (55.4)	15.6 (60.1)	18.4 (65.1)	18.0 (64.4)	14.5 (58.1)	0.0 (32.0)	−1.0 (30.2)	−4.0 (24.8)	−5.4 (22.3)
Average precipitation mm (inches)	2.6 (0.10)	5.8 (0.23)	3.4 (0.13)	2.9 (0.11)	2.2 (0.09)	2.5 (0.10)	39.9 (1.57)	26.6 (1.05)	6.6 (0.26)	0.4 (0.02)	0.9 (0.04)	6.3 (0.25)	100.1 (3.95)
Average precipitation days	0.2	0.5	0.9	0.2	0.3	0.4	1.9	1.4	0.3	0.1	0.1	0.3	6.6
Source: PMD (1991–2020)

== See also ==
- List of forts in Pakistan
- List of Indus Valley Civilisation sites
- List of museums in Pakistan
- List of World Heritage Sites in Pakistan
- Mehrgarh
