= Dancing Girl (prehistoric sculpture) =

Indus Valley Civilisation bronze sculpture

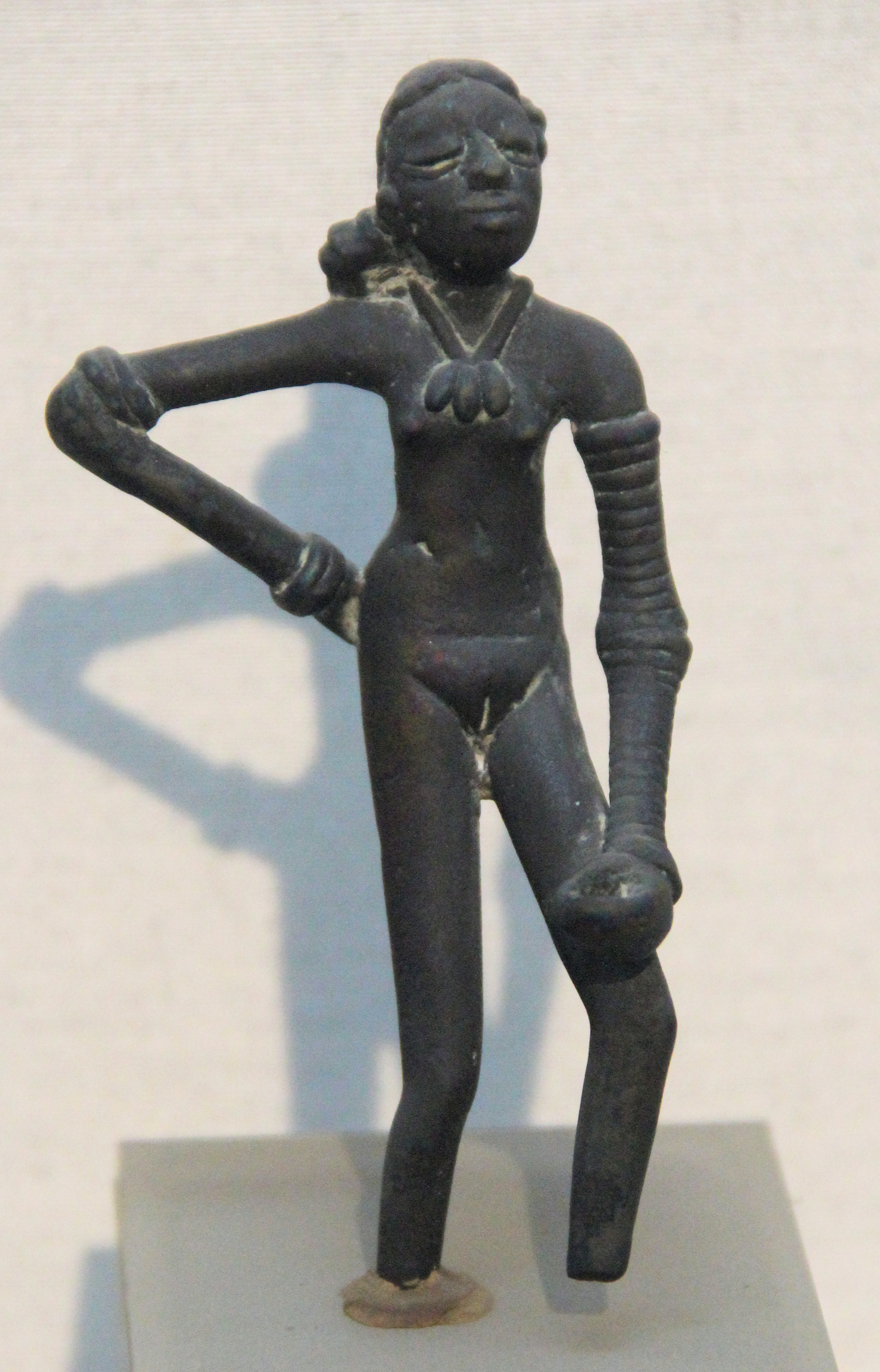
- Material: Bronze
- Height: 10.5 cm
- Created: c. 2000 BC
- Discovered: 1926; Sind Division, British Raj (present-day Sindh, Pakistan)
- Present location: National Museum, New Delhi, India

The Dancing Girl is a bronze sculpture made in lost-wax casting around c. 2300–1750 BC in the Indus Valley Civilisation city of Mohenjo-daro (in modern-day Pakistan), which was one of the earliest cities. The statue is 10.5 centimetres (4.1 in) tall, and depicts a nude young woman or girl with stylized ornaments, standing in a confident, naturalistic pose. Dancing Girl is highly regarded as a work of art.

The statue was excavated by British archaeologist Ernest Mackay in the "HR area" of Mohenjo-daro in 1926. It is now in the National Museum, New Delhi, having been allocated to India at the Partition of India in 1947.

== History ==
After excavation at Mohenjo-daro in 1926, this and the other finds were initially deposited in the Lahore Museum, but later moved to the Archaeological Survey of India headquarters at New Delhi, where a new "Central Imperial Museum" was being planned for the new capital of the British Raj, in which at least a selection would be displayed. It became apparent that Indian independence was approaching, but the Partition of India was not anticipated until late in the process.

The new Pakistani authorities requested the return of the Mohenjo-daro pieces excavated on their territory, but the Indian authorities refused. Eventually an agreement was reached, whereby the finds, totalling some 12,000 objects (most sherds of pottery), were split equally between the countries; in some cases this was taken very literally, with some necklaces and girdles having their beads separated into two piles. In the case of the "two most celebrated sculpted figures", Pakistan asked for and received the so-called Priest-King figure, while India retained the much smaller Dancing Girl.

Despite the division of the Mohenjo-daro finds having been agreed by the two governments at partition, some Pakistani politicians have subsequently demanded that the Dancing Girl be returned to Pakistan.

In 2016, a Pakistani barrister, Javed Iqbal Jaffery, petitioned the Lahore High Court for the return of the statue, claiming that it had been "taken from Pakistan 60 years ago on the request of the National Arts Council in Delhi but never returned". According to him, the Dancing Girl was to Pakistan what Da Vinci's Mona Lisa was to Europe. However, no public request to India has been made by the Pakistani government.

== Description ==
This is one of two bronze figures found at Mohenjo-daro that show more flexible features when compared to other more formal poses. The girl is nude, wears a number of bangles and a necklace and is shown in a natural standing position with one hand on her hip. She wears 24 to 25 bangles on her left arm and 4 bangles on her right arm, and some object was held in her left hand, which is resting on her thigh; both arms are unusually long. Her necklace has three big pendants. She has her long hair styled in a big bun that is resting on her shoulder.

== Interpretations ==
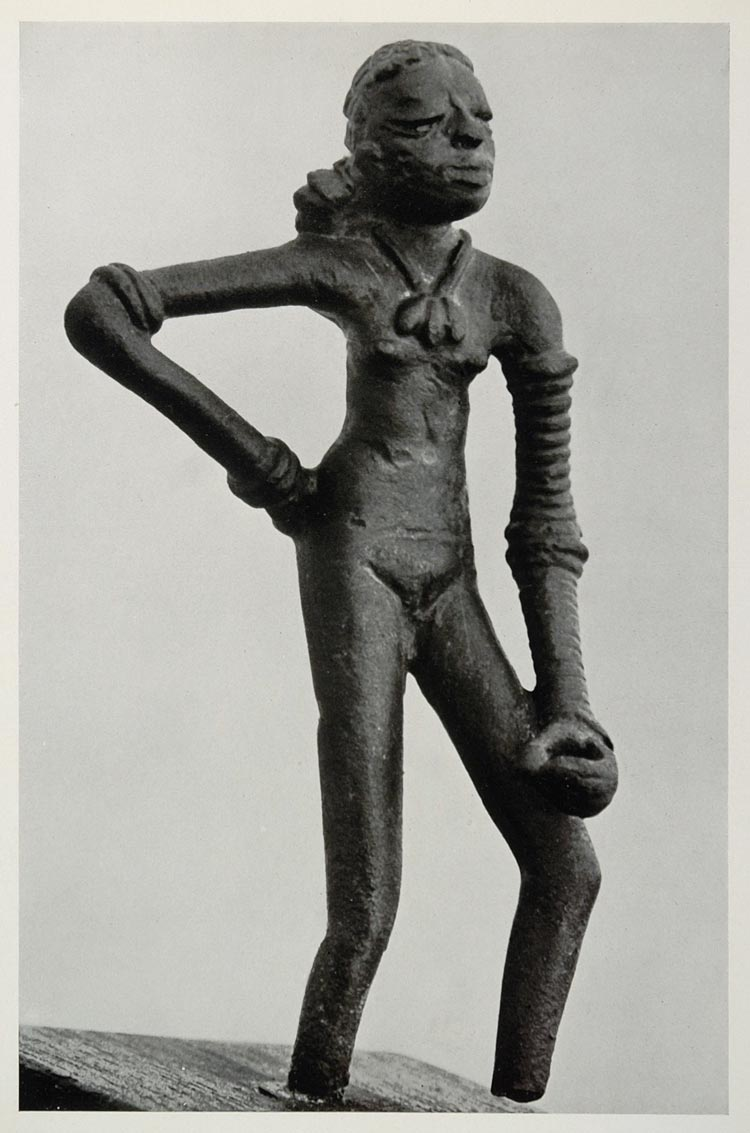
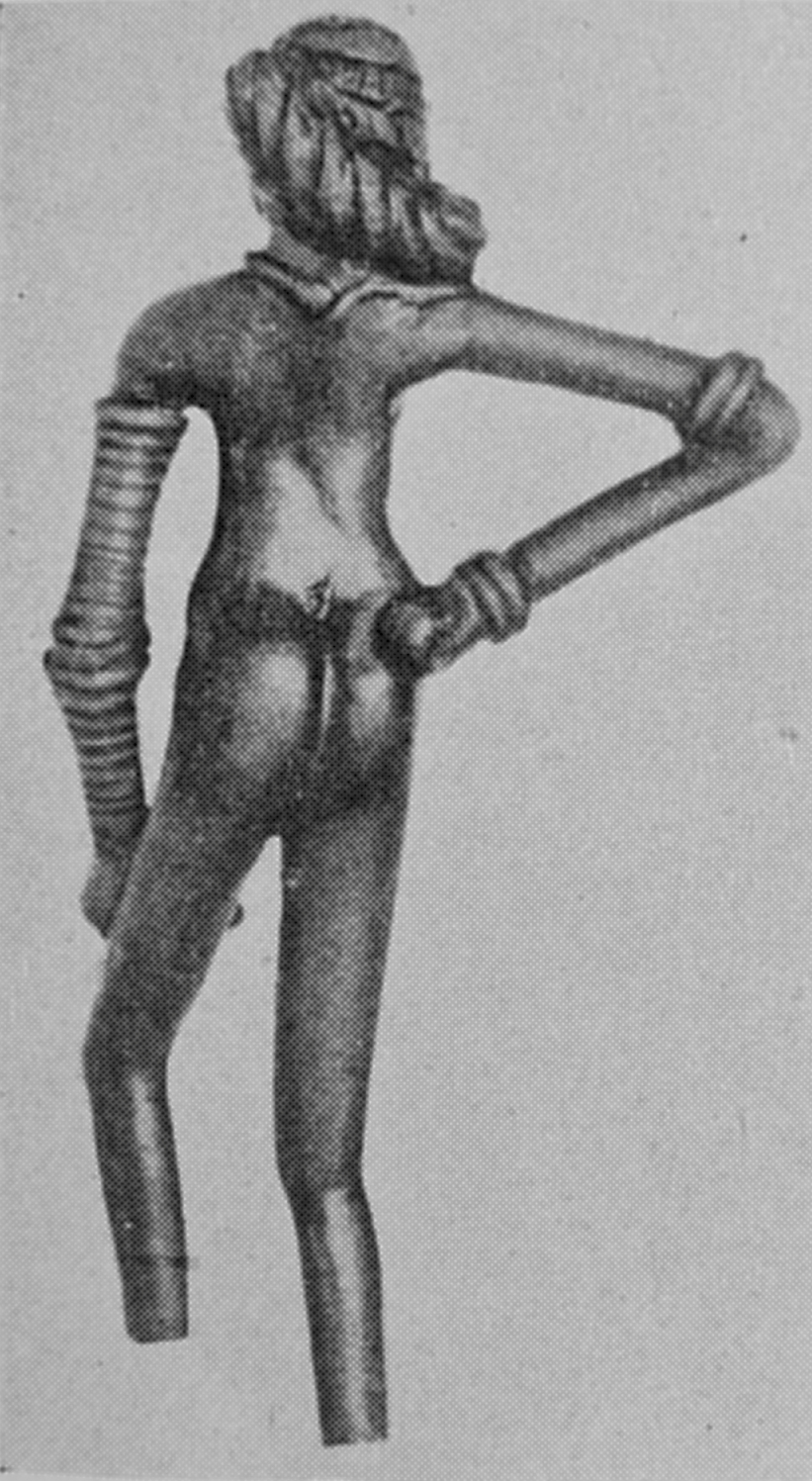
Bronze dancing girl (front and back views)

In 1973, British archaeologist Mortimer Wheeler described the item as his favourite statuette:

She's about fifteen years old I should think, not more, but she stands there with bangles all the way up her arm and nothing else on. A girl perfectly, for the moment, perfectly confident of herself and the world. There's nothing like her, I think, in the world.

John Marshall, the archeologist at Mohenjo-daro who found the figure, described the figure as "a young girl, her hand on her hip in a half-impudent posture, and legs slightly forward as she beats time to the music with her legs and feet". He is known to have reacted with surprise when he saw this statuette. He said "When I first saw them I found it difficult to believe that they were prehistoric." The archaeologist Gregory Possehl described Dancing Girl as "the most captivating piece of art from an Indus site" and qualified the description of her as a dancer by stating that "We may not be certain that she was a dancer, but she was good at what she did and she knew it."

To the American IVC specialist Jonathan Kenoyer, the reading of the figure as a dancer is "based on a colonial British perception of Indian dancers, but it more likely represents a woman carrying an offering" (which he also thinks the second figure is doing), although most sources, such as the National Museum of India, continue to see her as a dancer.

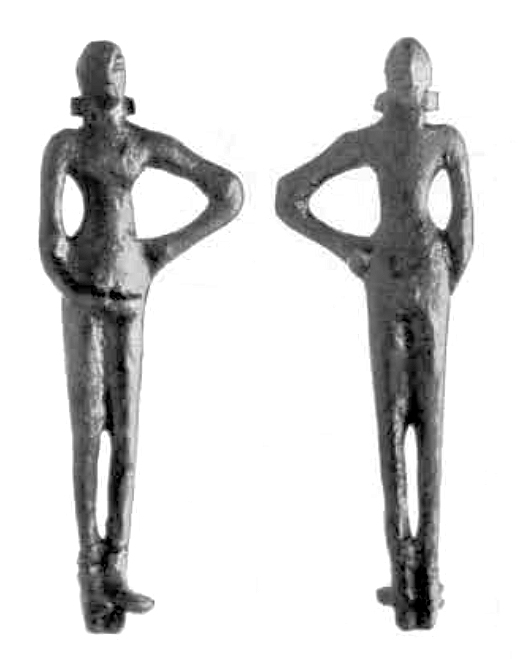
Second bronze statuette of a girl, now displayed at Karachi Museum, Pakistan

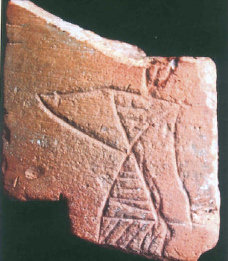
Dancing Girl engraving on a piece of red potsherd, discovered at Bhirrana, India

The statue led to two important discoveries about the civilization: first that they knew metal blending, casting and other sophisticated methods, and secondly that entertainment, especially dance, was part of the culture. The bronze girl was made using the lost-wax casting technique and shows the expertise of the people in making bronze works during that time.

A similar bronze statuette was found by Mackay during his final full season of 1930–1931 at DK-G area in a house at Mohenjo-daro. The preservation, as well as quality of craftsmanship, is inferior to that of the well known Dancing Girl. This second bronze female figure is displayed at the National Museum of Pakistan, Pakistan.

An engraving on a piece of red potsherd, discovered at Bhirrana, India, a Harappan site in Fatehabad district in Haryana, shows an image that is evocative of Dancing Girl. The excavation team leader, L. S. Rao, Superintending Archaeologist, Excavation Branch, ASI, remarked that, "the delineation [of the lines in the potsherd] is so true to the stance, including the disposition of the hands, of the bronze that it appears that the craftsman of Bhirrana had first-hand knowledge of the former".
