= Burns Garden =

Public park in Karachi

- برنس گارڈن
- Interactive map of Burns Garden
- Type: Urban park
- Location: Dr Ziauddin Ahmed Road, Karachi, Sindh, Pakistan
- Coordinates: 24.85319°N 67.01734°E
- Area: 11.1 acres (4.5 ha)
- Created: 1927
- Operator: Karachi Metropolitan Corporation
- Status: Open all year

Burns Garden is a public park in Karachi, Pakistan, situated on Dr Ziauddin Ahmed Road. It houses the National Museum of Pakistan.

== History ==
Burns Garden was founded in 1927. It is named for a physician frequently referred to as Dr Burns, and is possibly James Burnes, the Scottish surgeon who became physician-general of Bombay in colonial India. In its early years, Burns Garden, owing to its central location, drew considerable crowds of Karachi residents and their families, thereby cementing its popularity among the local populace.

== See also ==
- List of parks and gardens in Karachi
