= National Museum of Pakistan =

- قومی عجائب گھر پاکِستان
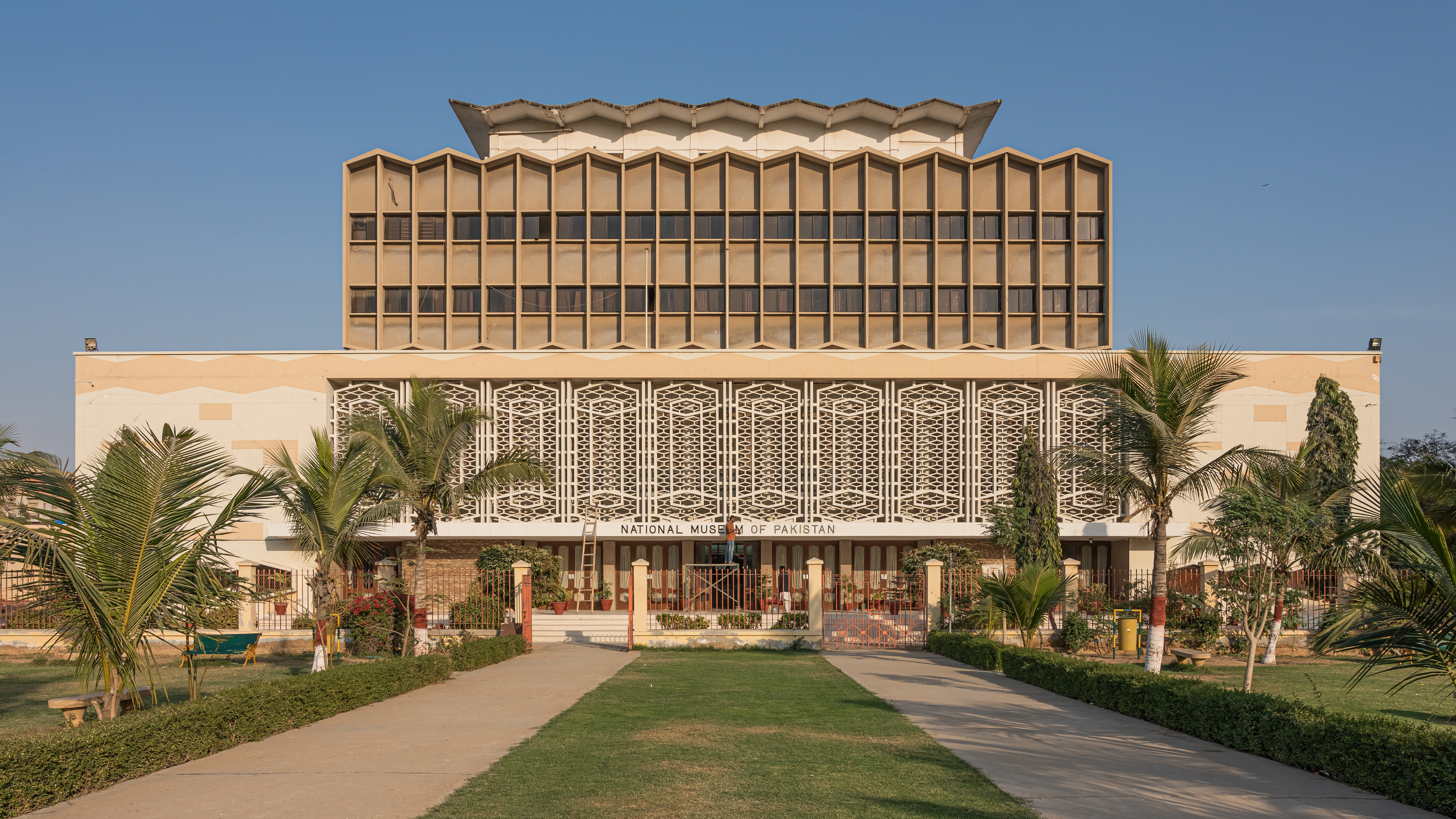
- Front View, National Museum, Karachi.
- Established: 1950
- Location: Dr. Ziauddin Ahmed Road, Karachi, Sindh
- Coordinates: 24°51′10″N 67°01′04″E
- Type: Art museum

The National Museum of Pakistan (Urdu: قومی عجائب گھر پاکِستان) is a public museum located in Karachi, Pakistan.

== History ==
The National Museum of Pakistan was established in Frere Hall in 1951, replacing the defunct Victoria Museum. Frere Hall itself was built in 1865 as a tribute to Sir Bartle Frere, a commissioner of Sind during the 19th century. Once the museum was inaugurated the government of Pakistan constituted an advisory council in 1950 with the primary duty to counsel the museum on the issues of enriching its collection through new acquisitions and purchase of antiquities and works of arts. In 1959 architect F.A. Khan outlined a plan for a new museum in a purpose-built modern building that would feature local materials in its construction. He expressed the hope that the museum would be 'truly representative of our great cultural heritage'. The museum was shifted to the present premises, located in Burns Garden, in 1970.

== Galleries ==
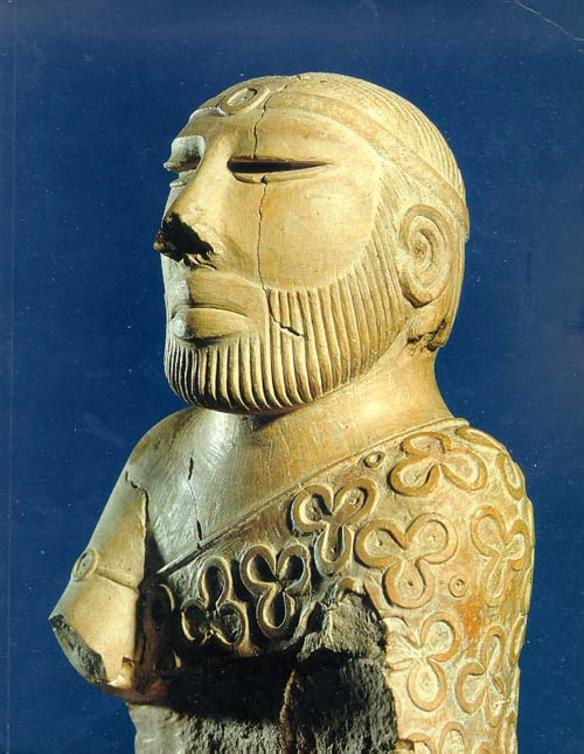
The Priest-King, an iconic artwork of the Indus Valley civilization; 2400–1900 BC; steatite; height: 17.5 cm (6 3/4 in.); National Museum of Pakistan (Karachi)

In 1970 there were only four galleries in the museum. Over time the museum grew, with the building currently housing eleven galleries including a “Quran Gallery”. The National Museum has more than 300 copies of the Quran, out of which around 52 rare manuscripts are on display. The museum also contains an important collection of items relating to Pakistan's cultural heritage. Other galleries display Indus Valley Civilisation artifacts, Gandhara civilization sculptures, Islamic art, miniature paintings, ancient coins and manuscripts documenting Pakistan's political history. There is also an Ethnological Gallery with life-size statues of different ethnicities living in the four provinces of modern-day Pakistan.

The museum has a collection of seals and statues found at the Mohenjo-daro site. The statues include the so-called Priest-King, terracotta toys and many stamp seals. It also shows some ancient coins found in those Hijri and some belongings of the national heroes of Pakistan: Quaid-e-Azam's pen, cuffs, and sword; Allama Iqbal's personal chair and pen; and Liaqat Ali Khan's personal itar bottle, watch and walking stick. There are galleries that show the clothing, pottery works and glasses Muslims used to make, and the apparatus that was used to make them.

== Collection ==
The museum has a collection of 58,000 old coins (some dating from 74 Al-Hijra), and hundreds of well-preserved sculptures. Some 70,000 publications, books and other reading material of the Archeology and Museums Department were also shifted to the National Museum so that the general public could see them. Every year National Museum holds around a dozen exhibitions on National Days and other occasions.

== Facilities ==
For the preservation of the collection, a conservation laboratory is also a part of the museum. There is an auditorium on the museum premises with the capacity to seat 250.

== See also ==
- Brahma from Mirpur-Khas
- List of museums in Pakistan
