= Indo-Mesopotamia relations =

Indus–Mesopotamia relations

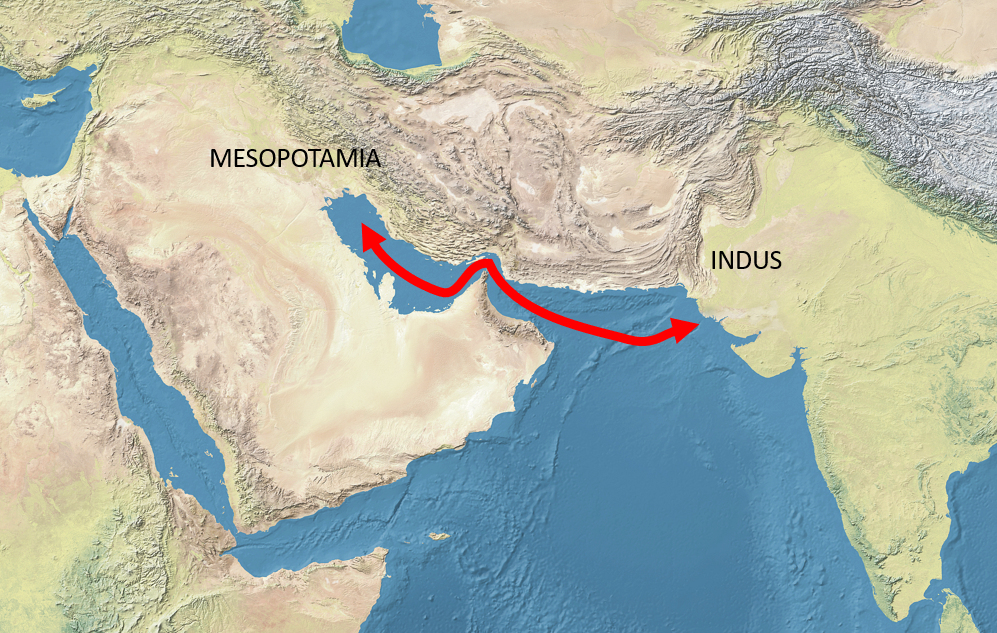
Trade routes between Mesopotamia and the Indus would have been significantly shorter due to lower sea levels in the 3rd millennium BCE.

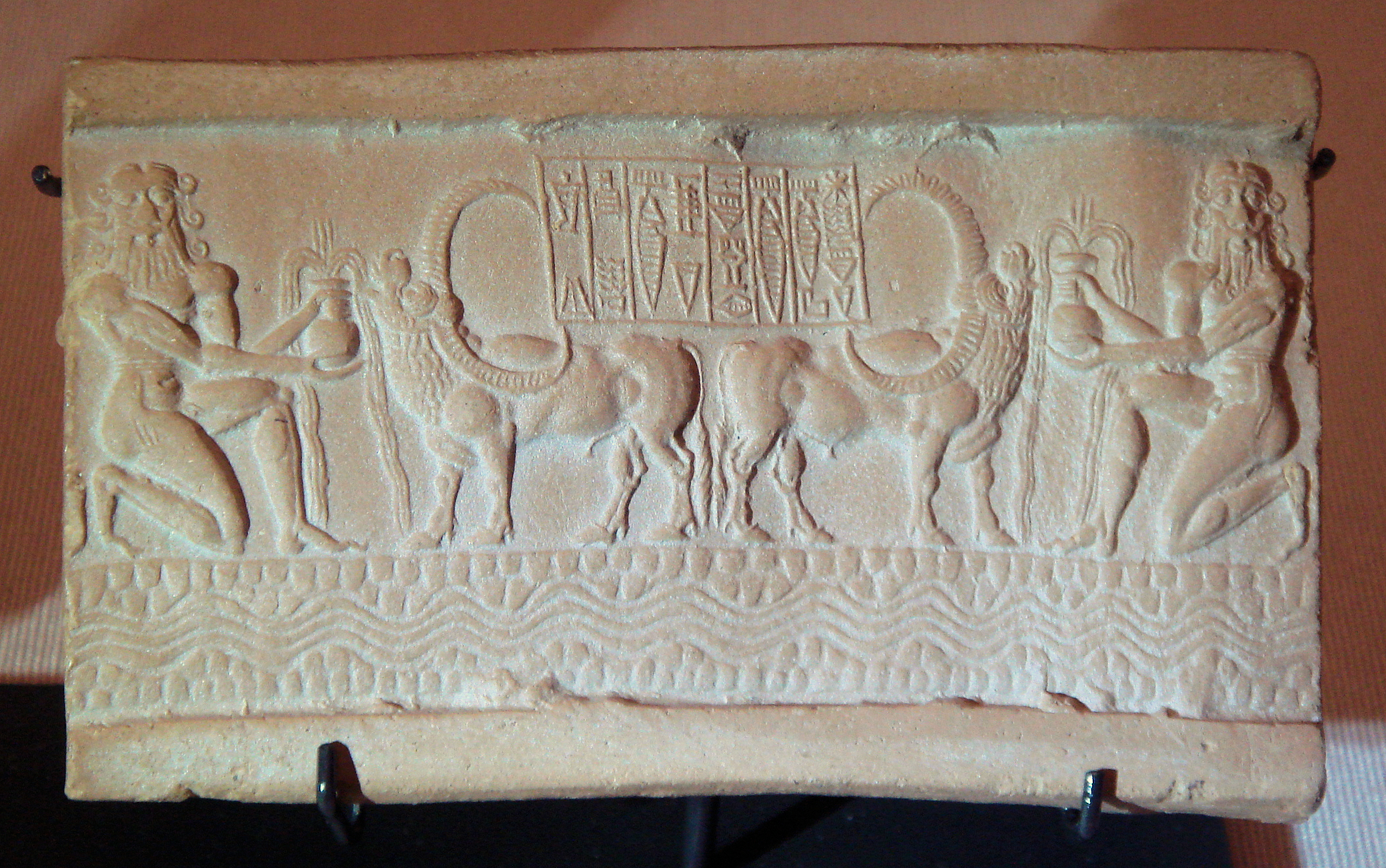
Impression of a cylinder seal of the Akkadian Empire, with label: "The Divine Sharkalisharri Prince of Akkad, Ibni-Sharrum the Scribe his servant". The long-horned water buffalo depicted in the seal is thought to have come from the Indus Valley, and testifies to exchanges with Meluhha, the Indus Valley Civilization. Circa 2217–2193 BCE. Louvre Museum, reference AO 22303.

Indo–Mesopotamia relations are thought to have developed during the second half of the 3rd millennium BCE, until they came to a halt with the extinction of the Indus Valley Civilization after around 1900 BCE. Mesopotamia had already been an intermediary in the trade of lapis lazuli between the Indus Valley and Egypt since at least about 3200 BCE, in the context of Egypt-Mesopotamia relations.

== Neolithic expansion (9000–6500 BCE) ==
Neolithic fertility figurines

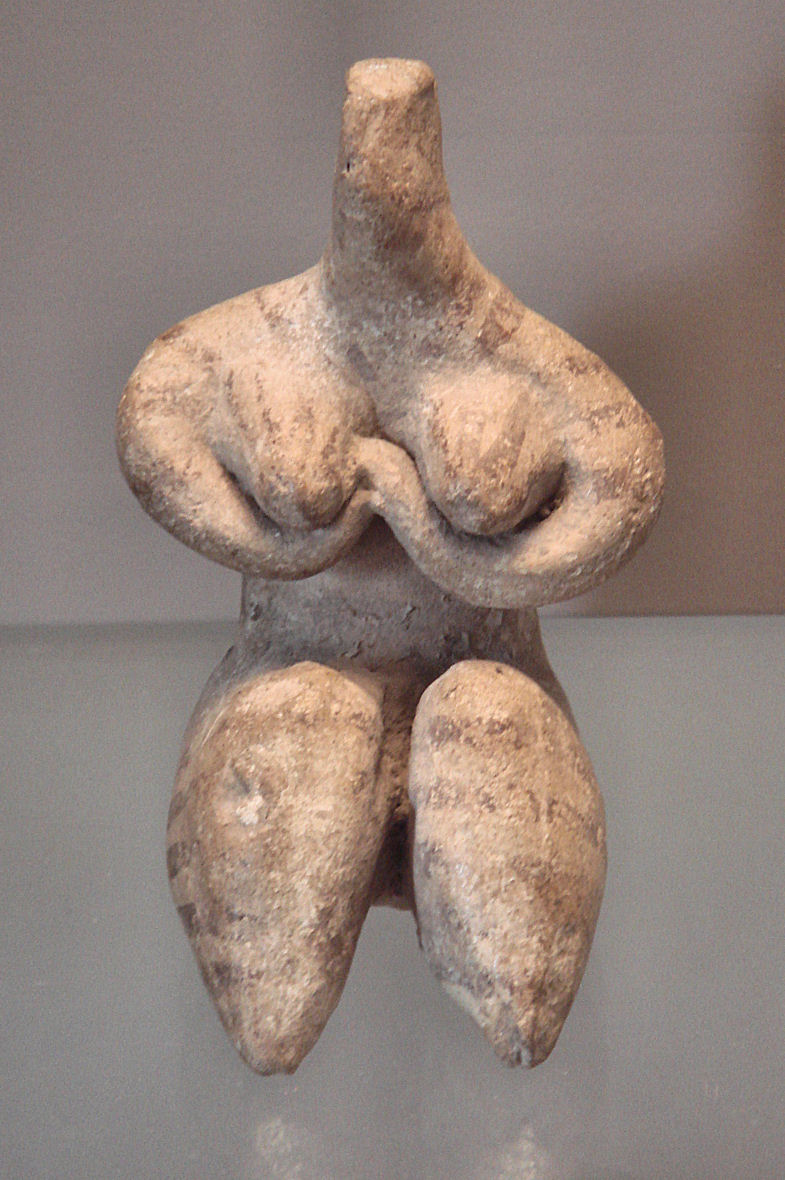
Fertility figurine of the Halaf culture, Mesopotamia, 6000–5100 BCE. Louvre.

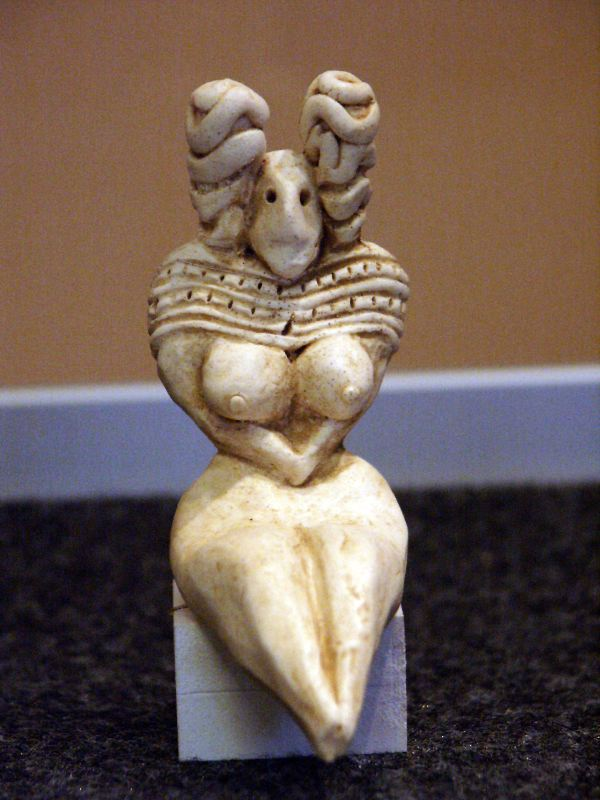
Fertility figurine from Mehrgarh, Indus Valley, 7000–3100 BCE.

Neolithic fertility goddesses in Mehrgarh are similar to those of the Near-East. They are all part of the Neolithic 'Venus figurines' tradition, the abundant breasts and hips of these figurines suggest links to fertility and procreation.

A first period of indirect contacts seems to have occurred as a consequence of the Neolithic Revolution and the diffusion of agriculture after 9000 BCE. (Note: According to Ahmad Hasan Dani, professor emeritus at Quaid-e-Azam University, Islamabad, the discovery of Mehrgarh "changed the entire concept of the Indus civilisation [...] There we have the whole sequence, right from the beginning of settled village life.") The prehistoric agriculture of the Indian subcontinent is thought to have combined local resources, such as humped cattle, with agricultural resources from the Near East as a first step in the 8th–7th millennium BCE, to which were later added resources from Africa and East Asia from the 3rd millennium BCE. Mehrgarh is one of the earliest sites with evidence of farming and herding in the subcontinent. (Note: Excavations at Bhirrana, Haryana, in India between 2006 and 2009, by archaeologist K.N. Dikshit, provided six artefacts, including "relatively advanced pottery", so-called Hakra ware, which were dated at a time bracket between 7380 and 6201 BCE. These dates compete with Mehrgarh for being the oldest site for cultural remains in the area. Yet, Dikshit and Mani clarify that this time-bracket concerns only charcoal samples, which were radio-carbon dated at respectively 7570–7180 BCE (sample 2481) and 6689–6201 BCE (sample 2333). Dikshit further writes that the earliest phase concerns 14 shallow dwelling-pits which "could accommodate about 3–4 people". According to Dikshit, in the lowest level of these pits wheel-made Hakra Ware was found which was "not well finished", together with other wares.) At Mehrgarh, around 7000 BCE, the full set of Near Eastern incipient agricultural products can be found: wheat, barley, as well as goats, sheep and cattle. The rectangular houses of Mehrgarh as well as the female figurines are essentially identical with those of the Near East.

The Near-Eastern origin of South Asian agriculture is generally accepted, and it has been the "virtual archaeological dogma for decades". Gregory Possehl however argues for a more nuanced model, in which the early domestication of plant and animal species may have occurred in a wide area from the Mediterranean to the Indus, in which new technology and ideas circulated fast and were widely shared. Today, the main objection to this model lies in the fact that wild wheat has never been found in South Asia, suggesting that either wheat was first domesticated in the Near-East from well-known domestic wild species and then brought to South Asia, or that wild wheat existed in the past in South Asia but somehow became extinct without leaving a trace.

Jean-François Jarrige argues for an independent origin of Mehrgarh. Jarrige notes "the assumption that farming economy was introduced full-fledged from Near-East to South Asia", (Note: According to Gangal et al. (2014), there is strong archeological and geographical evidence that neolithic farming spread from the Near East into north-west India. Gangal et al. (2014): "There are several lines of evidence that support the idea of connection between the Neolithic in the Near East and in the Indian subcontinent. The prehistoric site of Mehrgarh in Baluchistan (modern Pakistan) is the earliest Neolithic site in the north-west Indian subcontinent, dated as early as 8500 BCE.[18] Neolithic domesticated crops in Mehrgarh include more than 90% barley and a small amount of wheat. There is good evidence for the local domestication of barley and the zebu cattle at Mehrgarh [19], [20], but the wheat varieties are suggested to be of Near-Eastern origin, as the modern distribution of wild varieties of wheat is limited to Northern Levant and Southern Turkey [21]. A detailed satellite map study of a few archaeological sites in the Baluchistan and Khybar Pakhtunkhwa regions also suggests similarities in early phases of farming with sites in Western Asia [22]. Pottery prepared by sequential slab construction, circular fire pits filled with burnt pebbles, and large granaries are common to both Mehrgarh and many Mesopotamian sites [23]. The postures of the skeletal remains in graves at Mehrgarh bear strong resemblance to those at Ali Kosh in the Zagros Mountains of southern Iran [19]. Clay figurines found in Mehrgarh resemble those discovered at Teppe Zagheh on the Qazvin plain south of the Elburz range in Iran (the 7th millennium BCE) and Jeitun in Turkmenistan (the 6th millennium BCE) [24]. Strong arguments have been made for the Near-Eastern origin of some domesticated plants and herd animals at Jeitun in Turkmenistan (pp. 225–227 in [25]). The Near East is separated from the Indus Valley by the arid plateaus, ridges and deserts of Iran and Afghanistan, where rainfall agriculture is possible only in the foothills and cul-de-sac valleys [26]. Nevertheless, this area was not an insurmountable obstacle for the dispersal of the Neolithic. The route south of the Caspian sea is a part of the Silk Road, some sections of which were in use from at least 3,000 BCE, connecting Badakhshan (north-eastern Afghanistan and south-eastern Tajikistan) with Western Asia, Egypt and India [27]. Similarly, the section from Badakhshan to the Mesopotamian plains (the Great Khorasan Road) was apparently functioning by 4,000 BCE and numerous prehistoric sites are located along it, whose assemblages are dominated by the Cheshmeh-Ali (Tehran Plain) ceramic technology, forms and designs [26]. Striking similarities in figurines and pottery styles, and mud-brick shapes, between widely separated early Neolithic sites in the Zagros Mountains of north-western Iran (Jarmo and Sarab), the Deh Luran Plain in southwestern Iran (Tappeh Ali Kosh and Chogha Sefid), Susiana (Chogha Bonut and Chogha Mish), the Iranian Central Plateau (Tappeh-Sang-e Chakhmaq), and Turkmenistan (Jeitun) suggest a common incipient culture [28]. The Neolithic dispersal across South Asia plausibly involved migration of the population ([29] and [25], pp. 231–233). This possibility is also supported by Y-chromosome and mtDNA analyses [30], [31].") and the similarities between Neolithic sites from eastern Mesopotamia and the western Indus valley, which are evidence of a "cultural continuum" between those sites. But given the originality of Mehrgarh, Jarrige concludes that Mehrgarh has an earlier local background, and is not a "'backwater' of the Neolithic culture of the Near East".

== Land and maritime relations ==
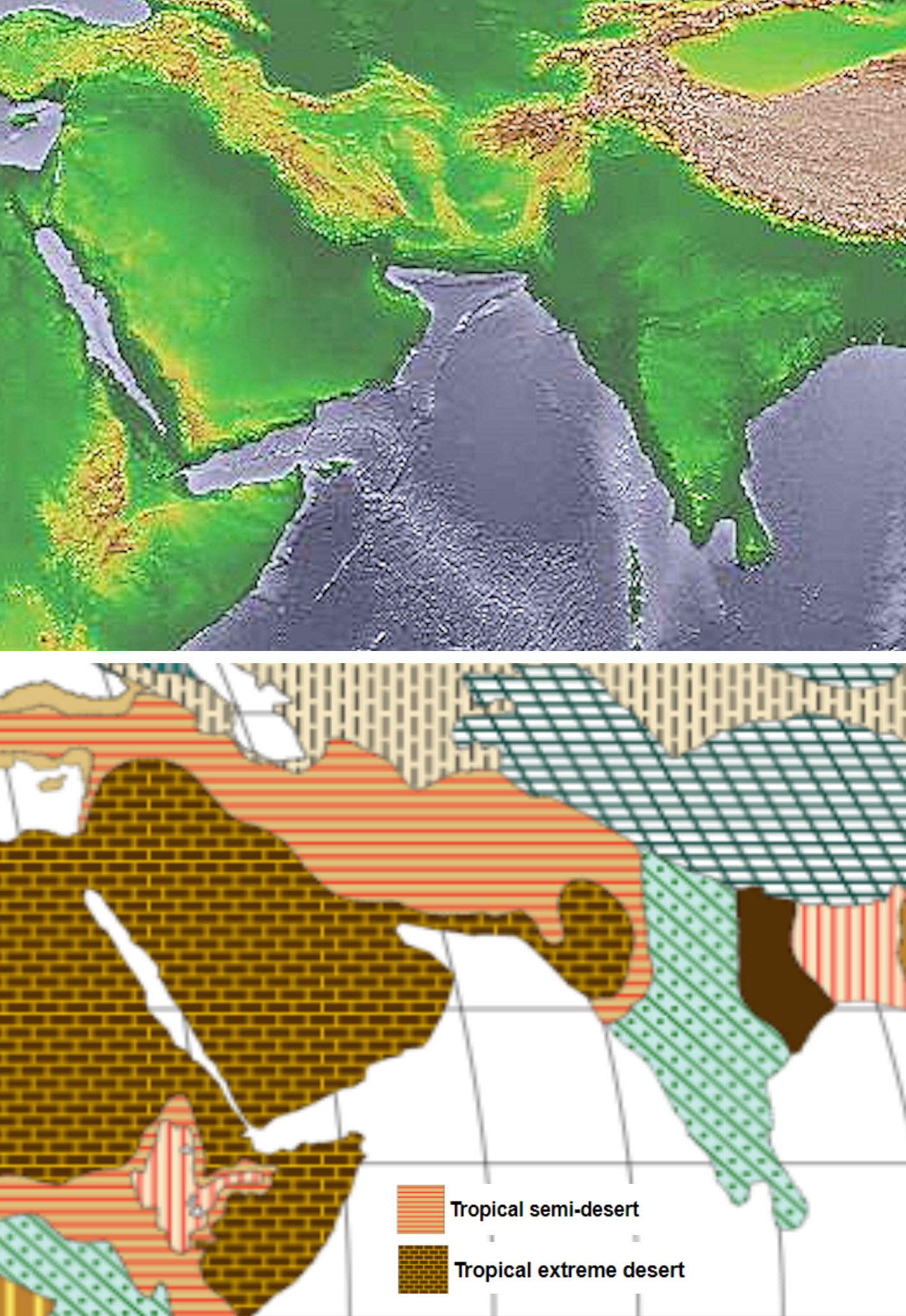
Global sea levels and vegetation during the Last Ice Age. The coastline was still roughly similar in about 10,000 BCE.

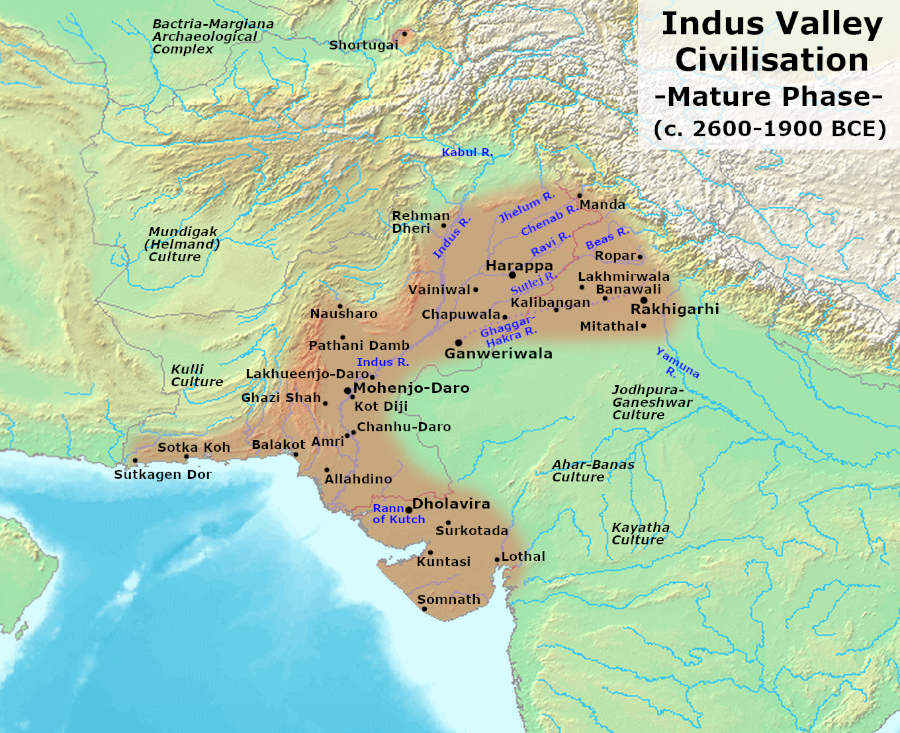
The Indus Valley Civilization extended westward as far as the Harappan trading station of Sutkagan Dor.

Sea levels have been rising about 100 meters over the last 15,000 years until modern times, with the effect that coast lines have been receding vastly. This is especially the case of the coast lines of the Indus and Mesopotamia, which were originally only separated by a distance of about 1000 kilometers, compared to 2000 kilometers today. For the ancestors of the Sumerians, the distance between the coasts of the Mesopotamian area and the Indus area would have been much shorter than it is today. In particular the Persian Gulf, which is only about 30 meters deep today, would have been at least partially dry, and would have formed an extension of the Mesopotamian basin.

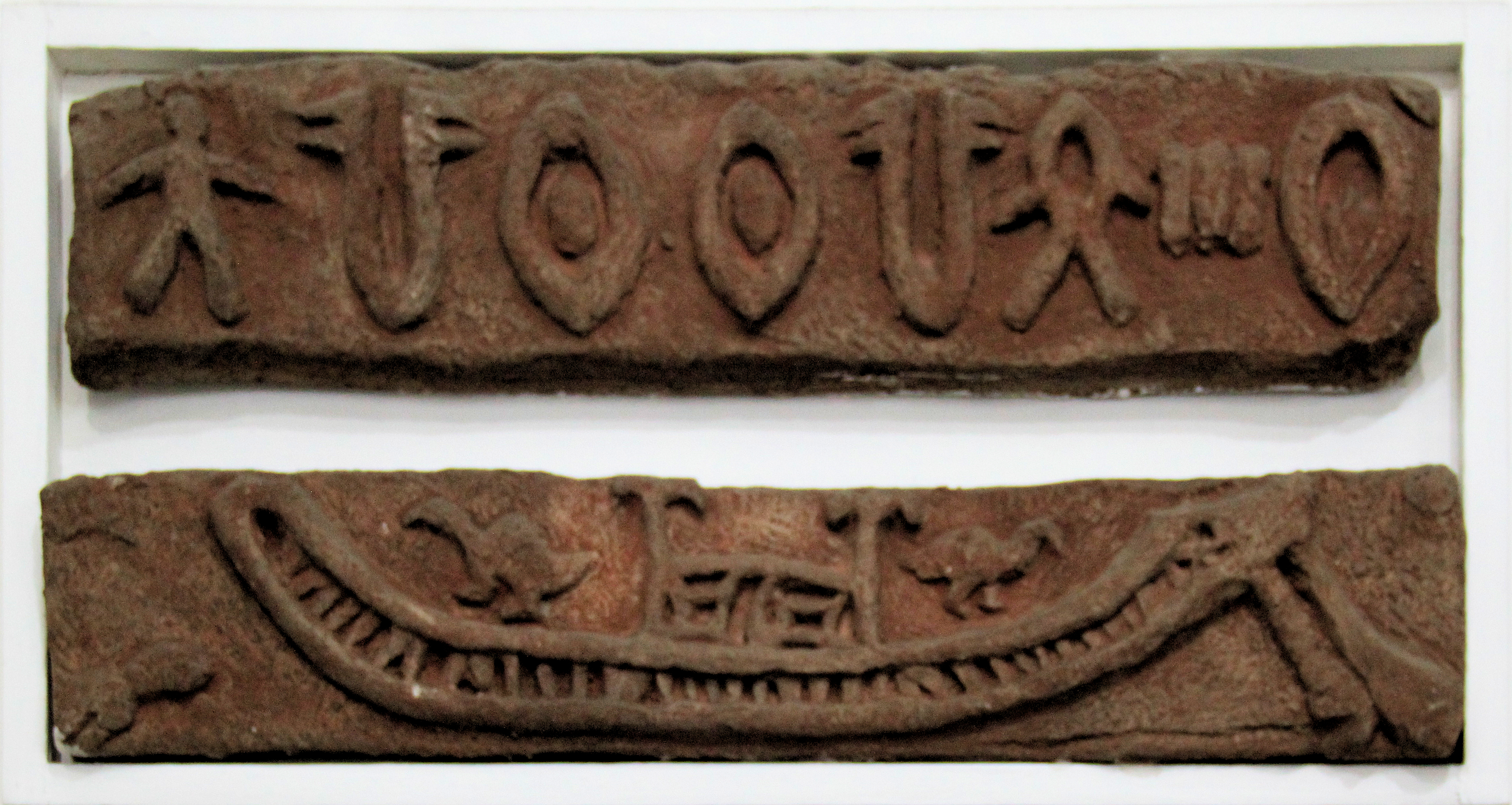
Boat with direction-finding birds to find land. Model of Mohenjo-daro tablet, 2500–1750 BCE.(National Museum, New Delhi).

The westernmost Harappan city was located on the Makran coast at Sutkagan Dor, near the tip of the Arabian Peninsula, and is considered as an ancient maritime trading station, probably between modern day Pakistan and the Persian Gulf.

Sea-going vessels were known in the Indus region, as shown by seals showing ships with land-finding birds (disha-kaka), dating to 2500–1750 BCE. When a boat was lost at sea, with land beyond the horizon, birds released by the mariners would securely fly back to land, and therefore show the boats the way to safety. Various stamp seals are known from the Indus and the Persian Gulf area, with depictions of large ships pertaining to different shipbuilding traditions. Sargon of Akkad (c. 2334–2284 BCE) claimed in one of his inscriptions that "ships from Meluhha, Magan and Dilmun made fast at the docks of Akkad".

== Commercial and cultural exchanges ==
Many archaeological finds suggest that maritime trade along the shores of Africa and Asia started several millennia ago. Indus pottery and seals have been found along the sea routes between the Indus and Mesopotamia, as in Ras al-Jinz, at the tip of Arabia.

=== Indus imports into Mesopotamia ===
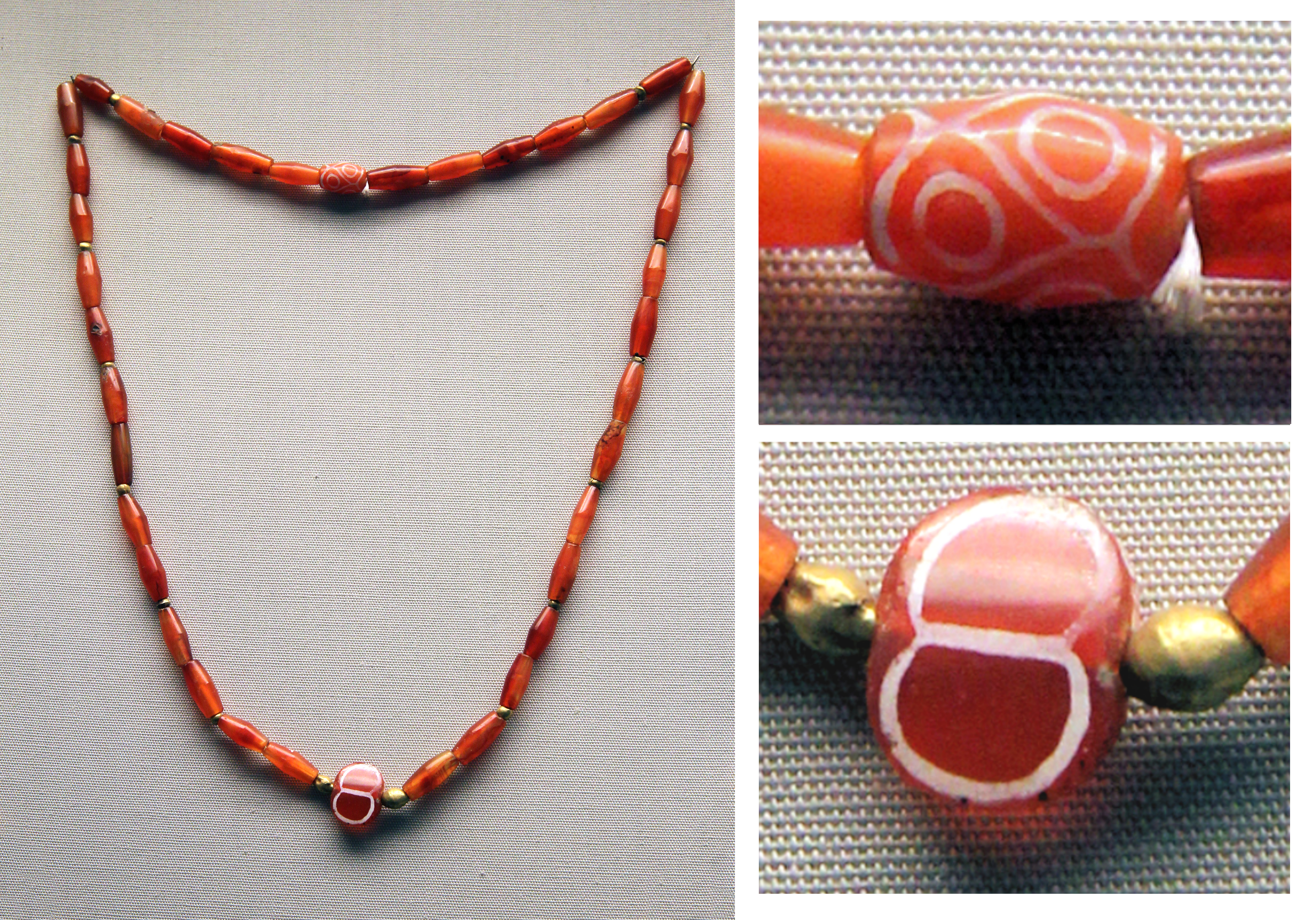
The etched carnelian beads in this necklace from the Royal Cemetery dating to the First Dynasty of Ur (2600–2500 BCE) were probably imported from the Indus Valley.

Clove heads, thought to originate from the Moluccas in Maritime Southeast Asia were found in a 2nd millennium BCE site in Terqa. Evidence for imports from the Indus to Ur can be found from around 2350 BCE. Various objects made with shell species that are characteristic of the Indus coast, particularly Trubinella Pyrum and Fasciolaria Trapezium, have been found in the archaeological sites of Mesopotamia dating from around 2500–2000 BCE. Carnelian beads from the Indus were found in Ur tombs dating to 2600–2450. In particular, carnelian beads with an etched design in white were probably imported from the Indus Valley, and made according to a technique of acid-etching developed by the Harappans. Lapis Lazuli was imported in great quantity by Egypt, and already used in many tombs of the Naqada II period (circa 3200 BCE). Lapis Lazuli probably originated in northern Afghanistan, as no other sources are known from that time, and had to be transported across the Iranian plateau to Mesopotamia, and then Egypt.

Several Indus seals with Harappan script have also been found in Mesopotamia, particularly in Ur, Babylon and Kish. The water buffalos that appear on Akkadian cylinder seals from the time of Naram-Sin (circa 2250 BCE) may have been imported to Mesopotamia from the Indus as a result of trade.

Akkadian Empire records mention timber, carnelian and ivory as being imported from Meluhha by Meluhhan ships, Meluhha being generally considered as the Mesopotamian name for the Indus Valley.

'The ships from Meluhha, the ships from Magan, the ships from Dilmun, he made tie-up alongside the quay of Akkad'

— Inscription by Sargon of Akkad (ca.2270–2215 BCE)

After the collapse of the Akkadian Empire, Gudea, the ruler of Lagash, is recorded as having imported "translucent carnelian" from Meluhha. Various inscriptions also mention the presence of Meluhha traders and interpreters in Mesopotamia. About twenty seals have been found from the Akkadian and Ur III sites, that have connections with Harappa and often use Harappan symbols or writing.

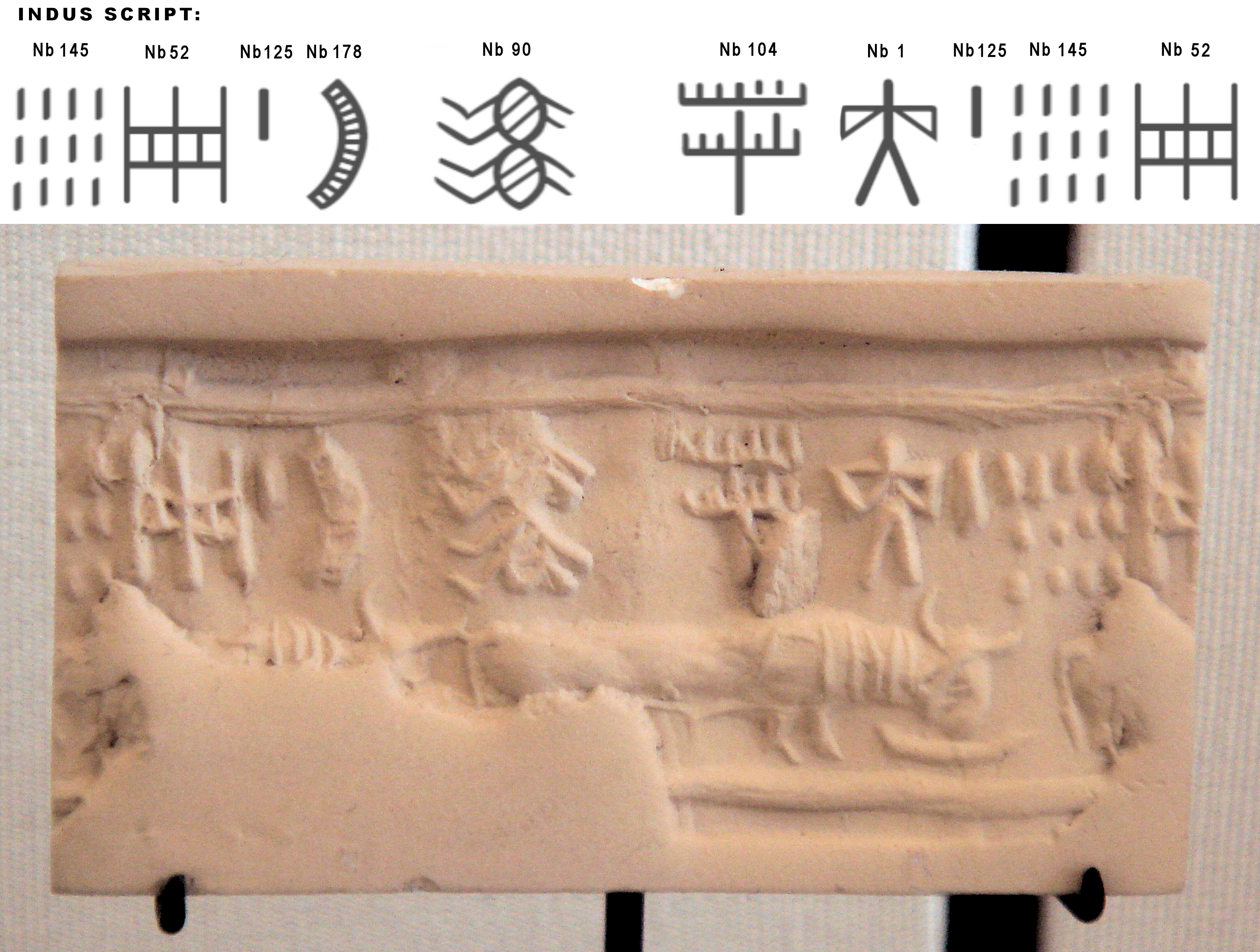
A modern impression of an Indus cylinder seal discovered in Susa, in strata dated to 2600–1700 BCE. Elongated buffalo with line of standard Indus script signs. Tell of the Susa acropolis. Louvre Museum, reference Sb 2425. Indus script numbering convention per Asko Parpola.

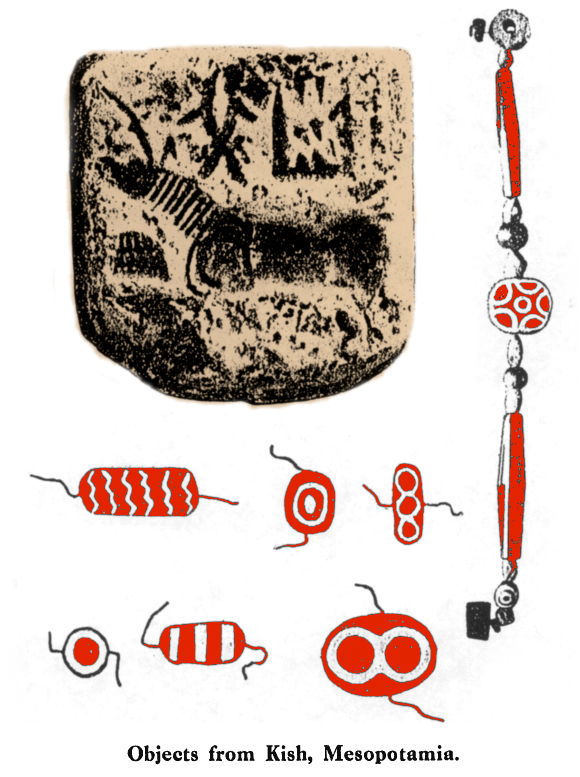
Indus Valley "Unicorn" seal and etched carnelian beads excavated in Kish by Ernest J. H. Mackay, Mesopotamia, early Sumerian period stratification, circa 3000 BCE.

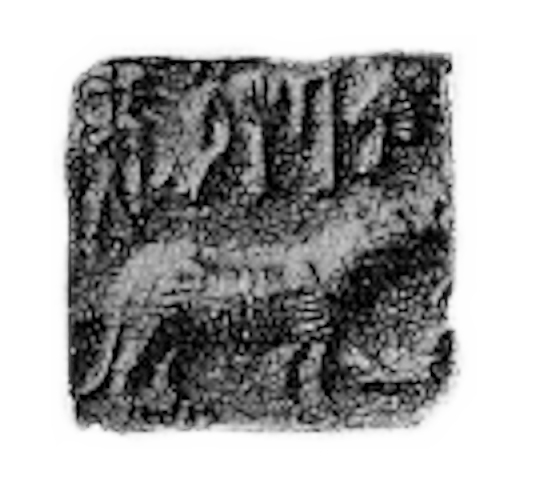
Indus seal discovered in Telloh, Mesopotamia.

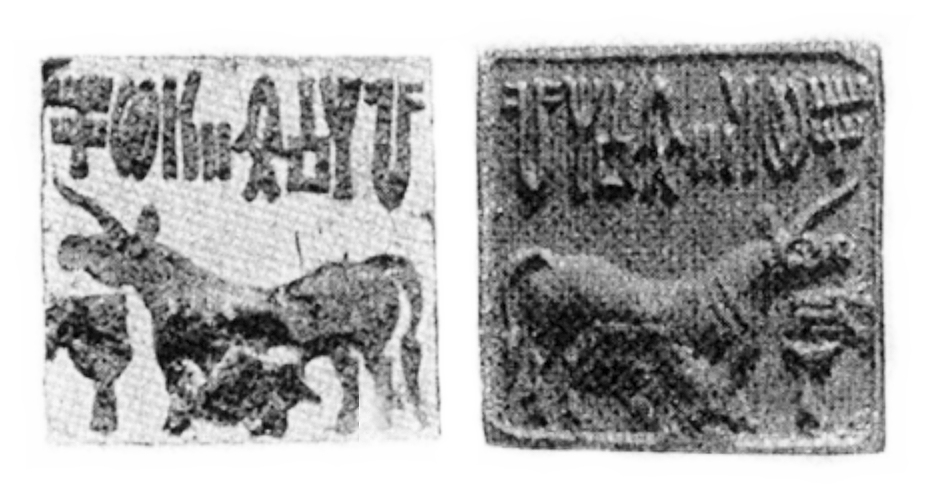
Indus seal found in Kish by S. Langdon. Pre-Sargonid (pre-2250 BCE) stratification.

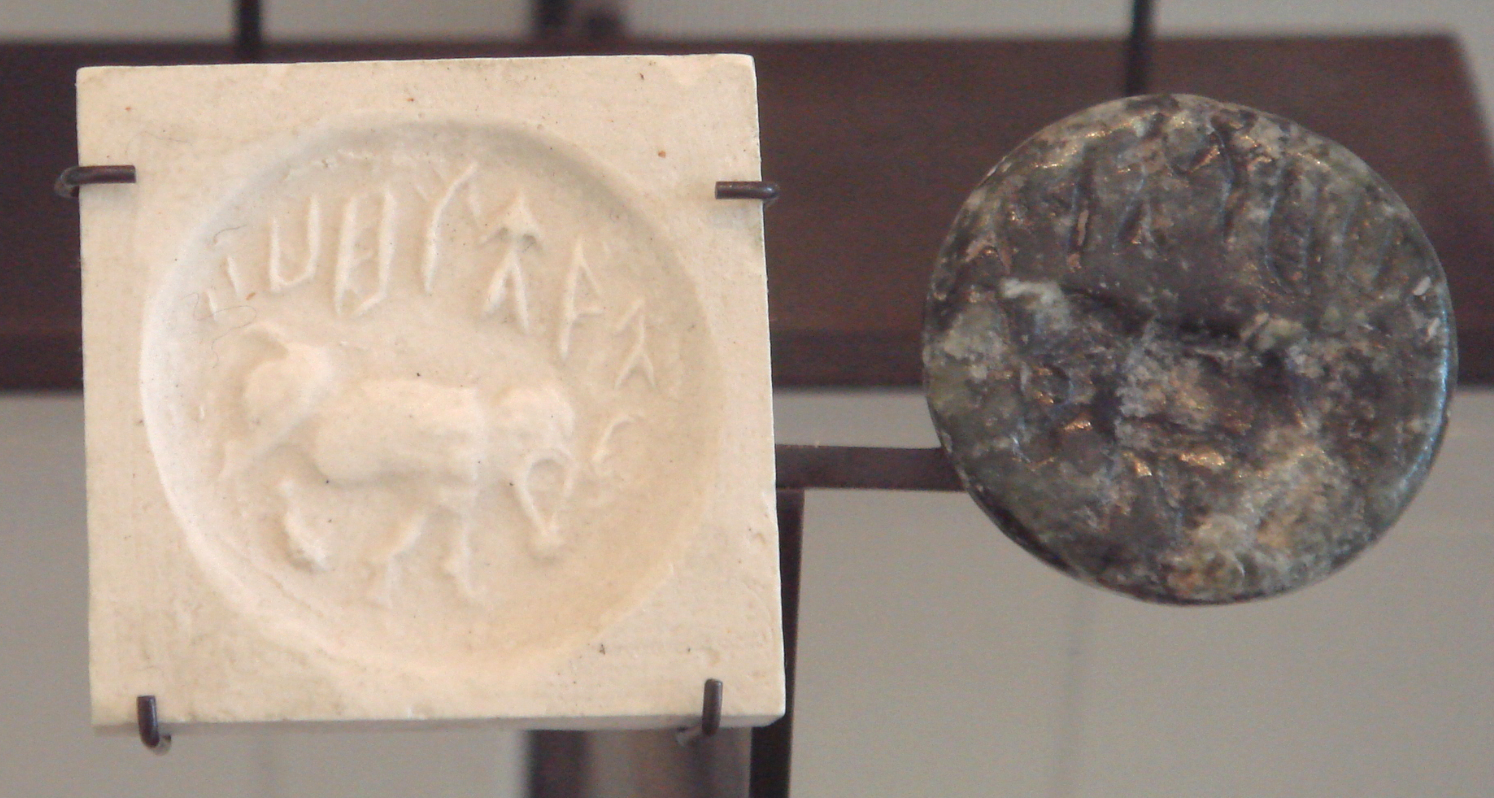
Indus round seal with impression. Elongated buffalo with Harappan script imported to Susa in 2600–1700 BCE. Found in the tell of the Susa acropolis. Louvre Museum, reference Sb 5614

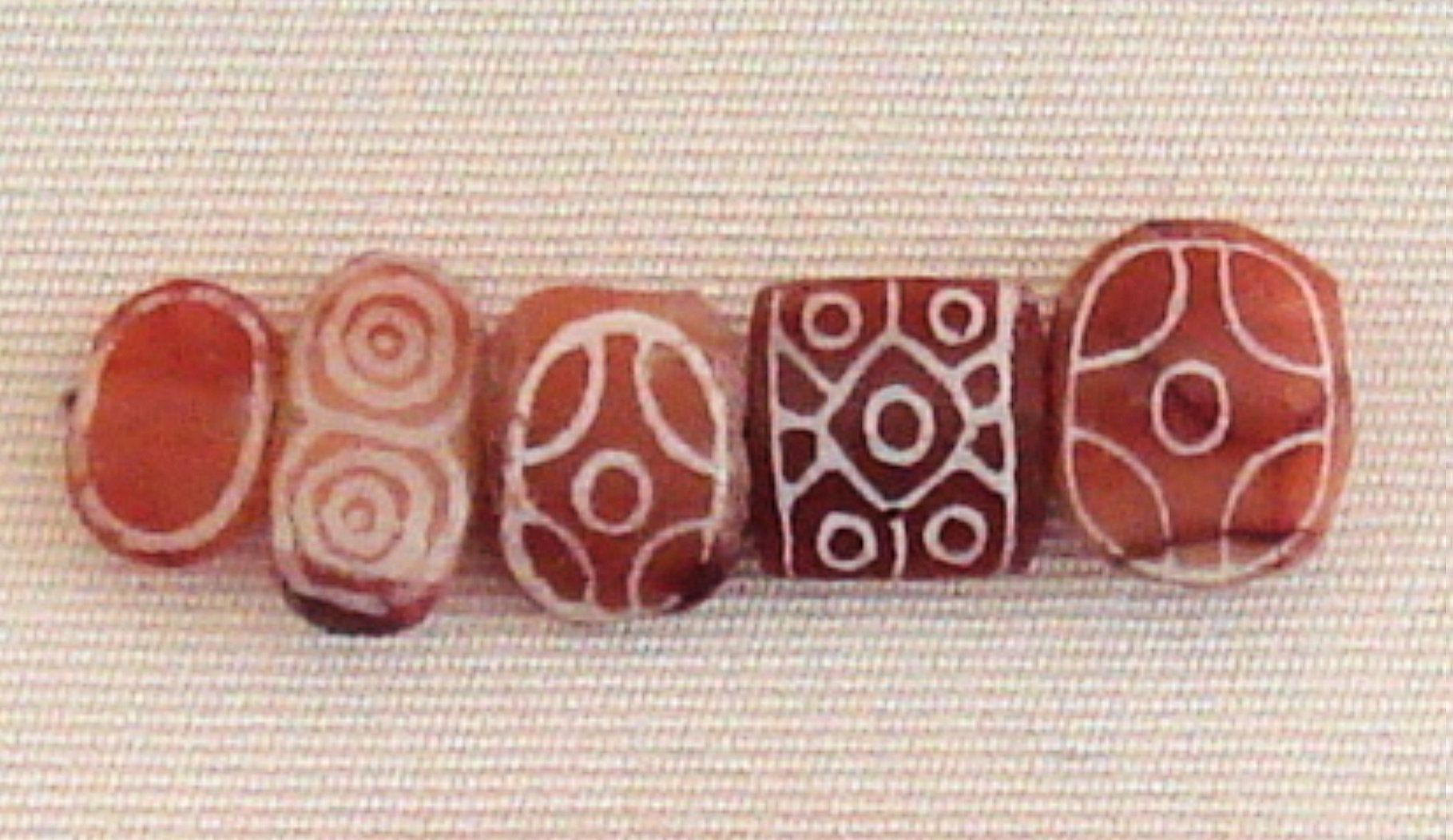
Indian carnelian beads with white design, etched in white with an alkali through a heat process, imported to Susa in 2600–1700 BCE. Found in the tell of the Susa acropolis. Louvre Museum, reference Sb 17751. These beads are identical with beads found in the Indus Civilization site of Dholavira.

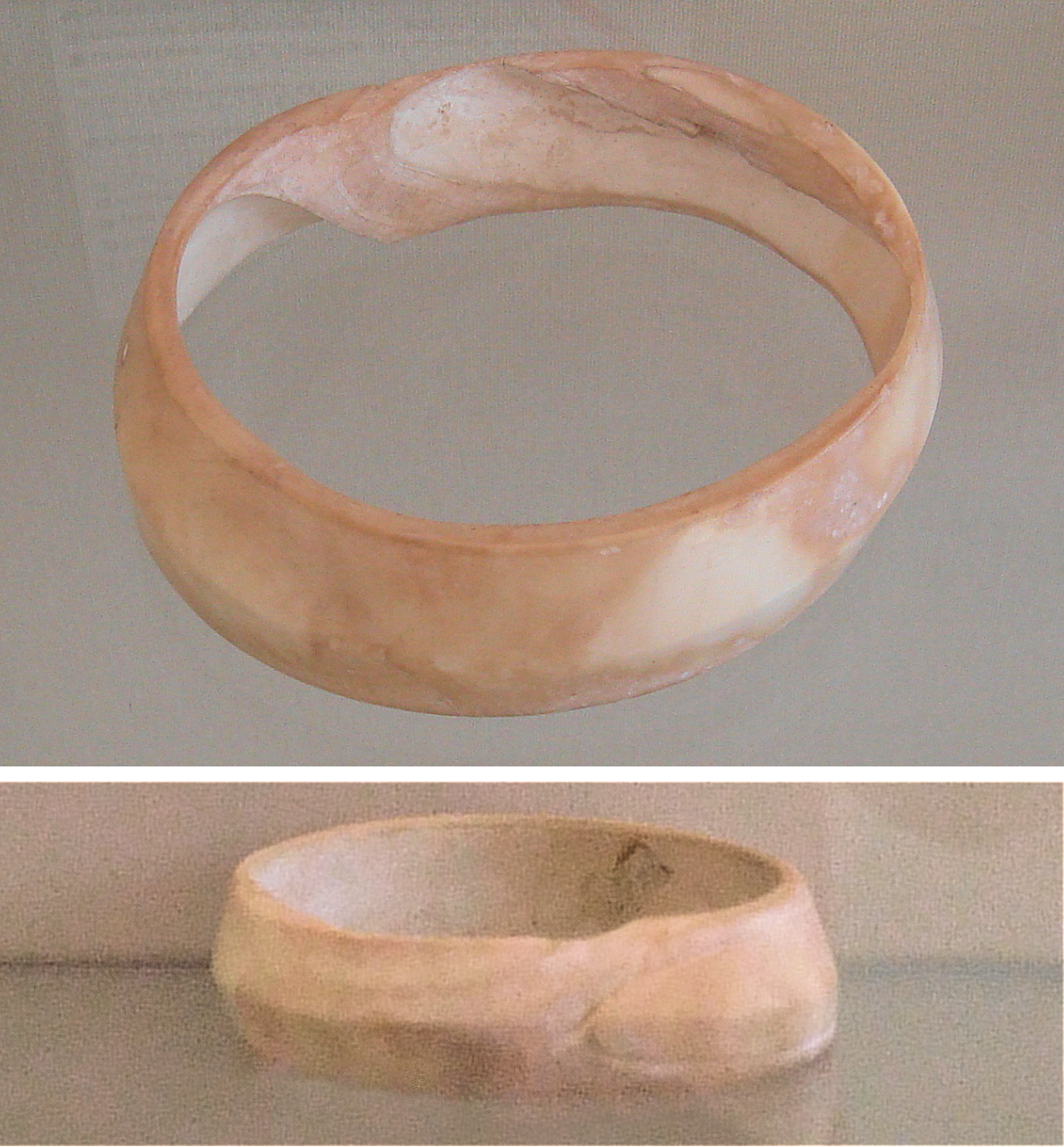
Indus bracelet, front and back, made of Fasciolaria Trapezium or Xandus Pyrum imported to Susa in 2600–1700 BCE. Found in the tell of the Susa acropolis. Louvre Museum, reference Sb 14473. This type of bracelet was manufactured in Mohenjo-daro, Lothal and Balakot. The back is engraved with an oblong chevron design which is typical of shell bangles of the Indus Civilization.

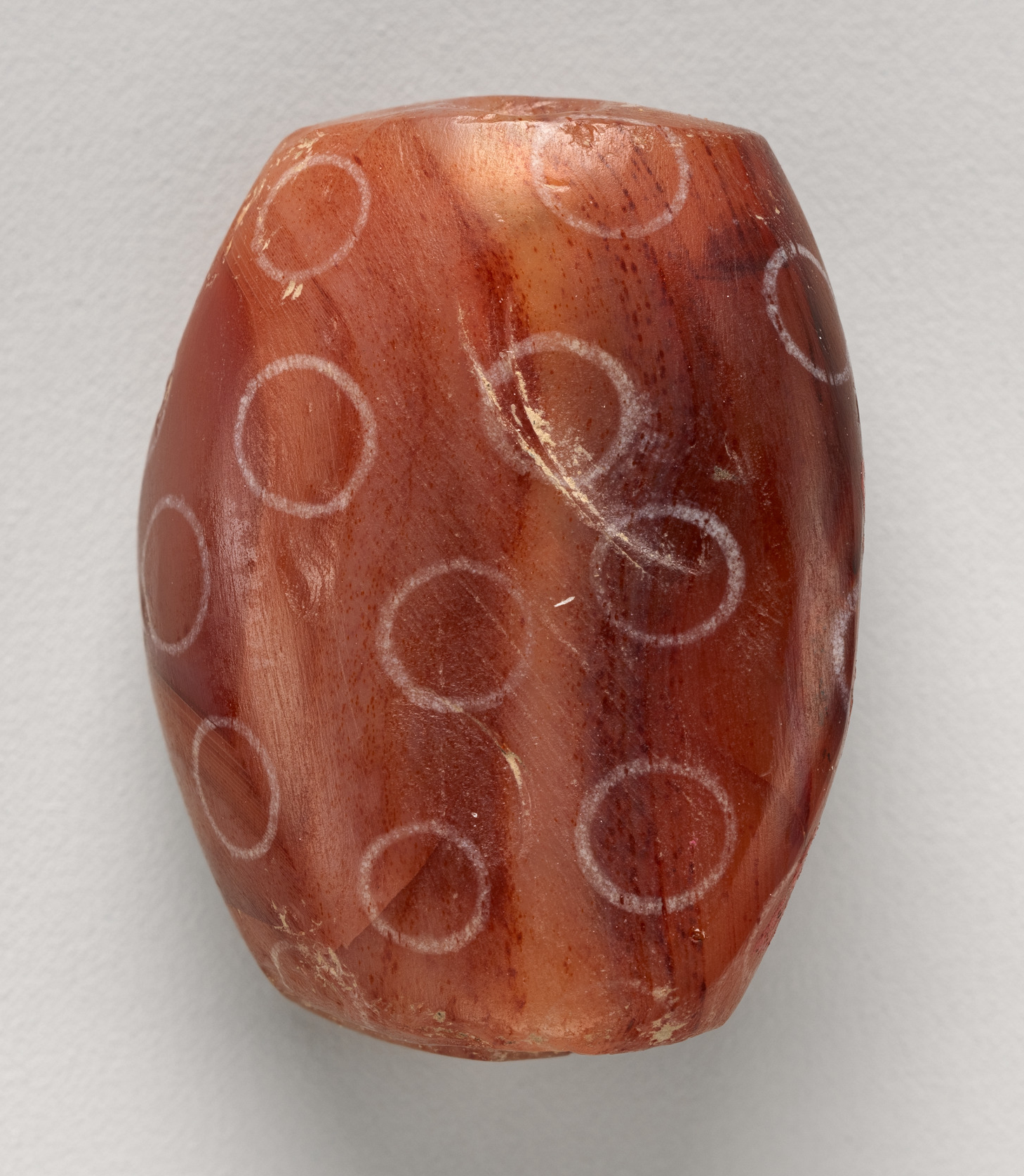
Indus Civilisation Carnelian bead with white design, ca. 2900–2350 BCE. Found in Nippur, Mesopotamian.

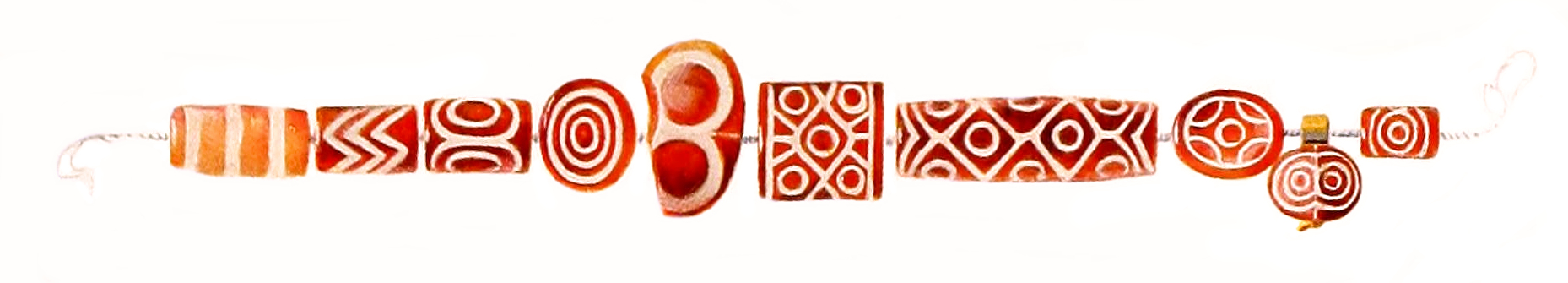
Etched carnelian beads excavated in the Royal Cemetery of Ur, tomb PG 1133, 2600–2500 BCE.

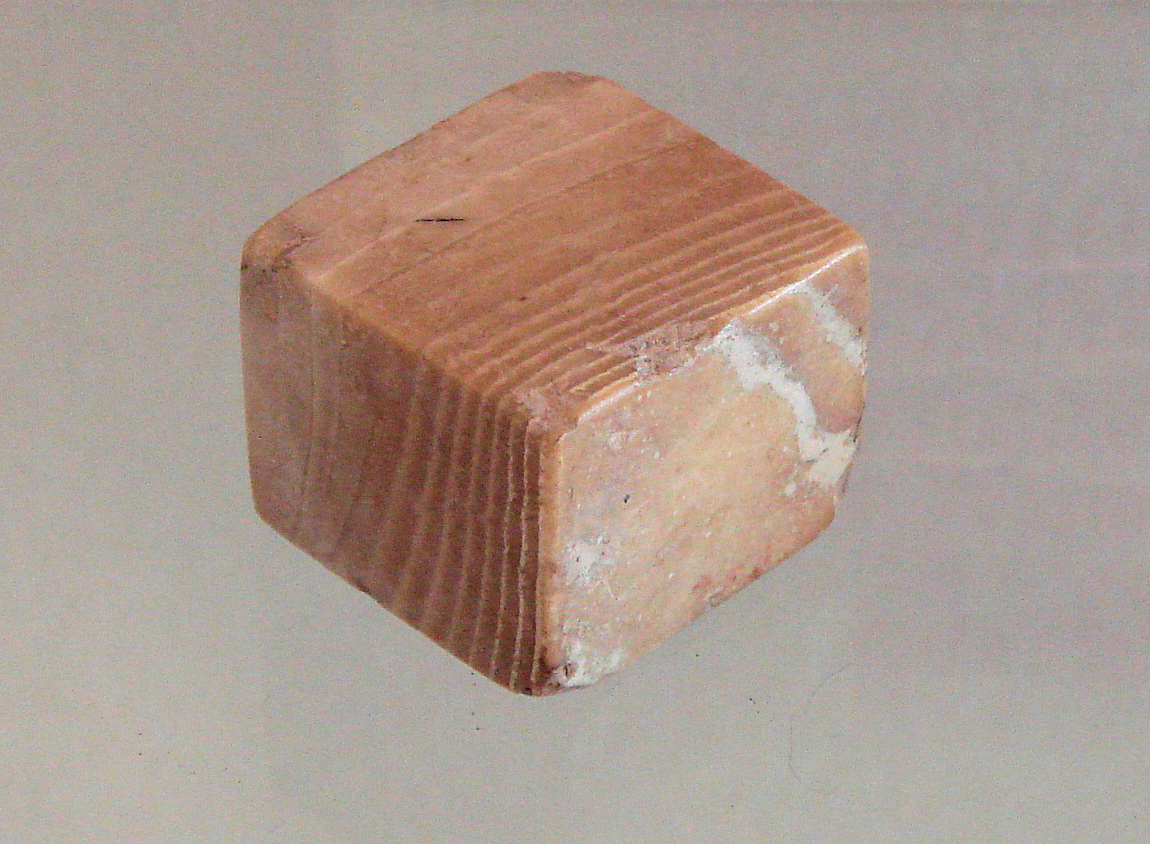
Indus Valley Civilization weight in veined jasper, excavated in Susa in a 12th-century BCE princely tomb. Louvre Museum Sb 17774.

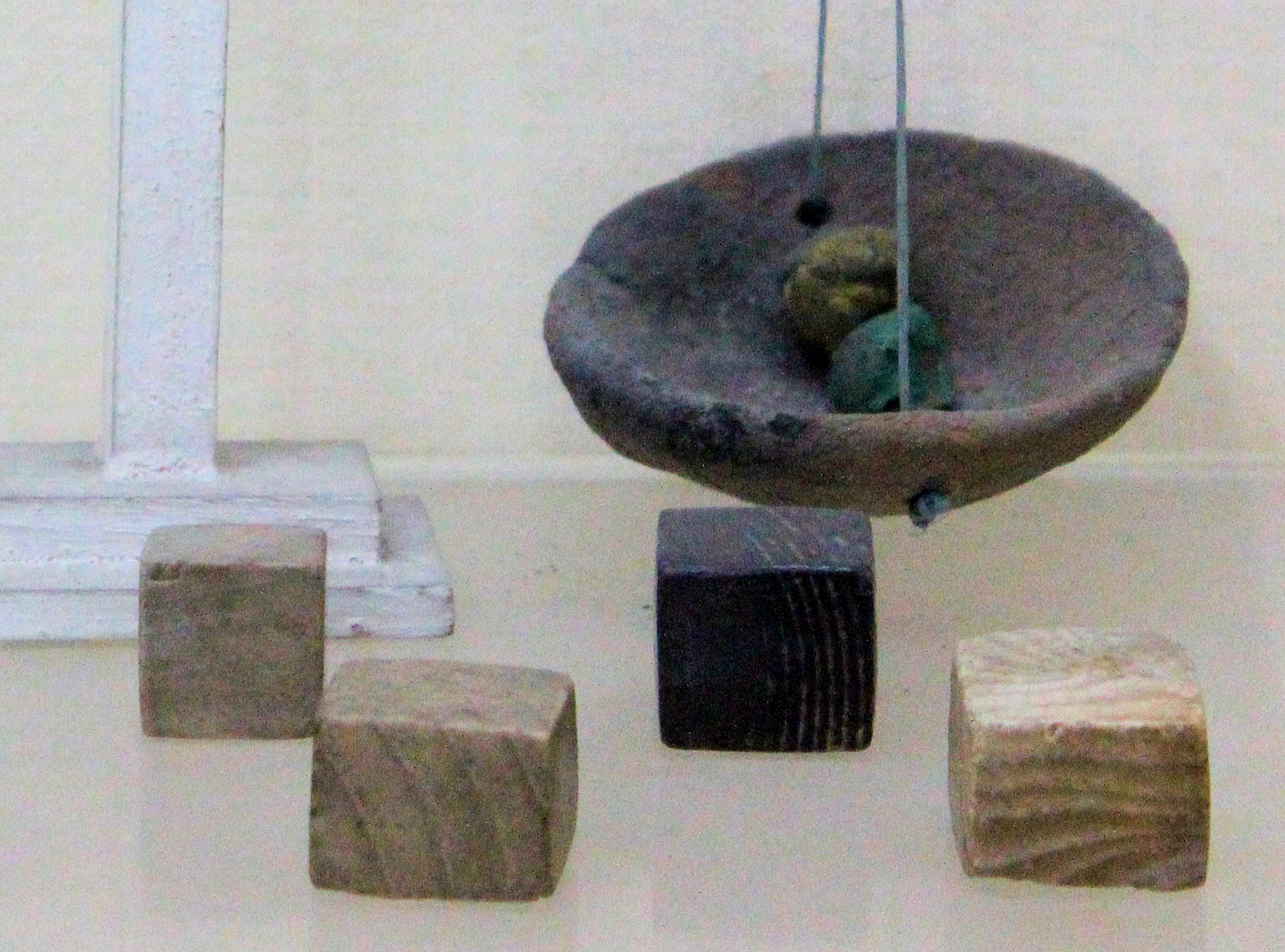
Similar Harappan weights found in the Indus Valley. New Delhi Museum.

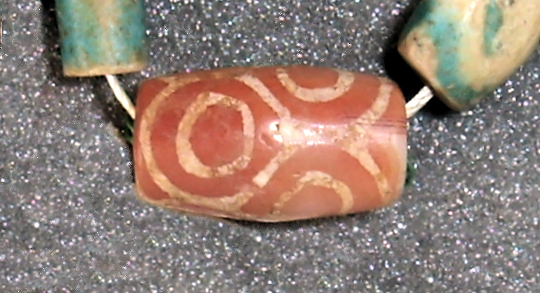
A rare etched carnelian bead found in Egypt, thought to have been imported from the Indus Valley Civilization through Mesopotamia. Late Middle Kingdom. London, Petrie Museum of Egyptian Archaeology, ref. UC30334.

=== Mesopotamian imports into the Indus ===
Master of Animals

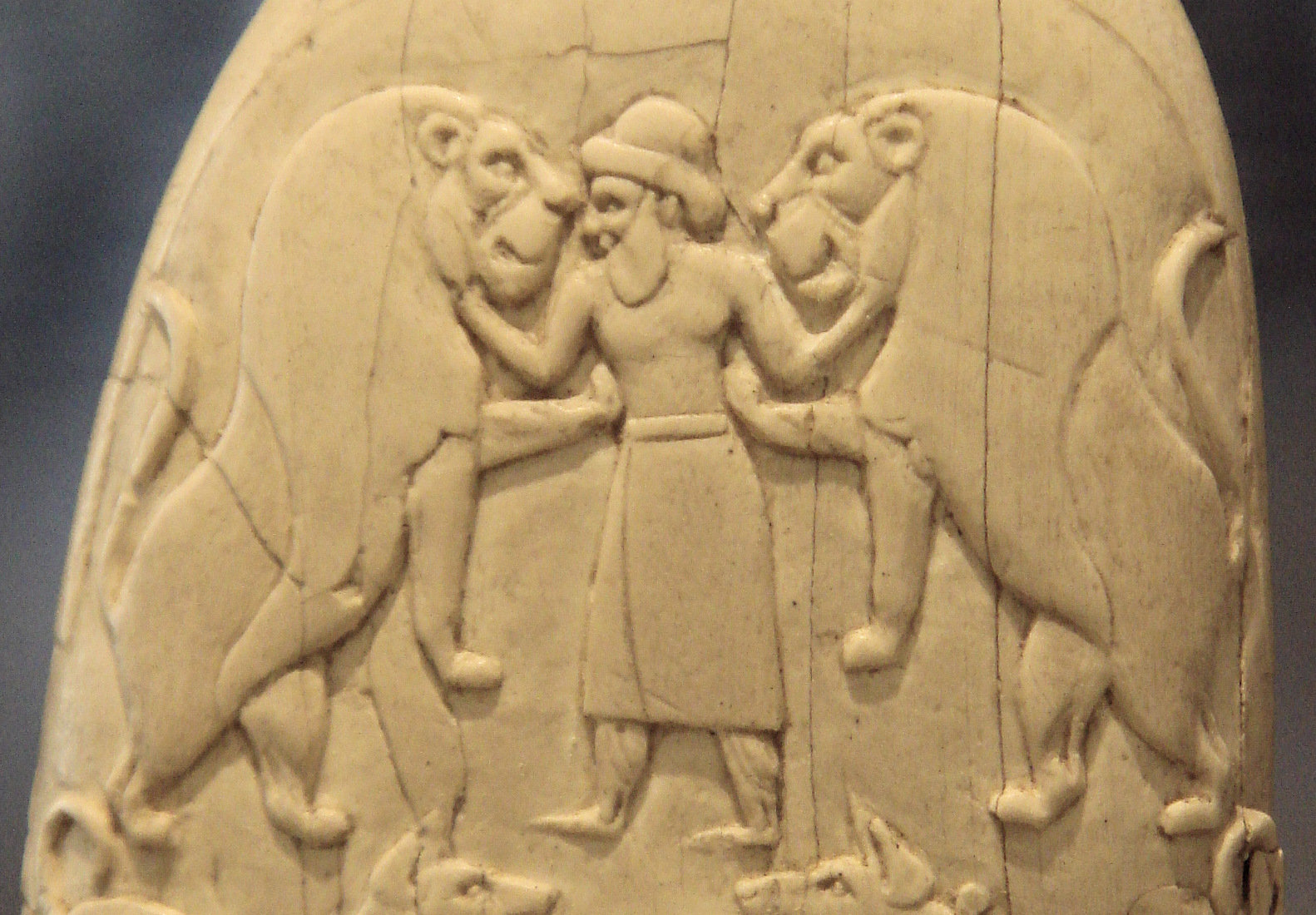
Uruk period Mesopotamian king as Master of Animals on the Gebel el-Arak Knife, dated circa 3300–3200 BCE. Louvre Museum, reference E 11517.

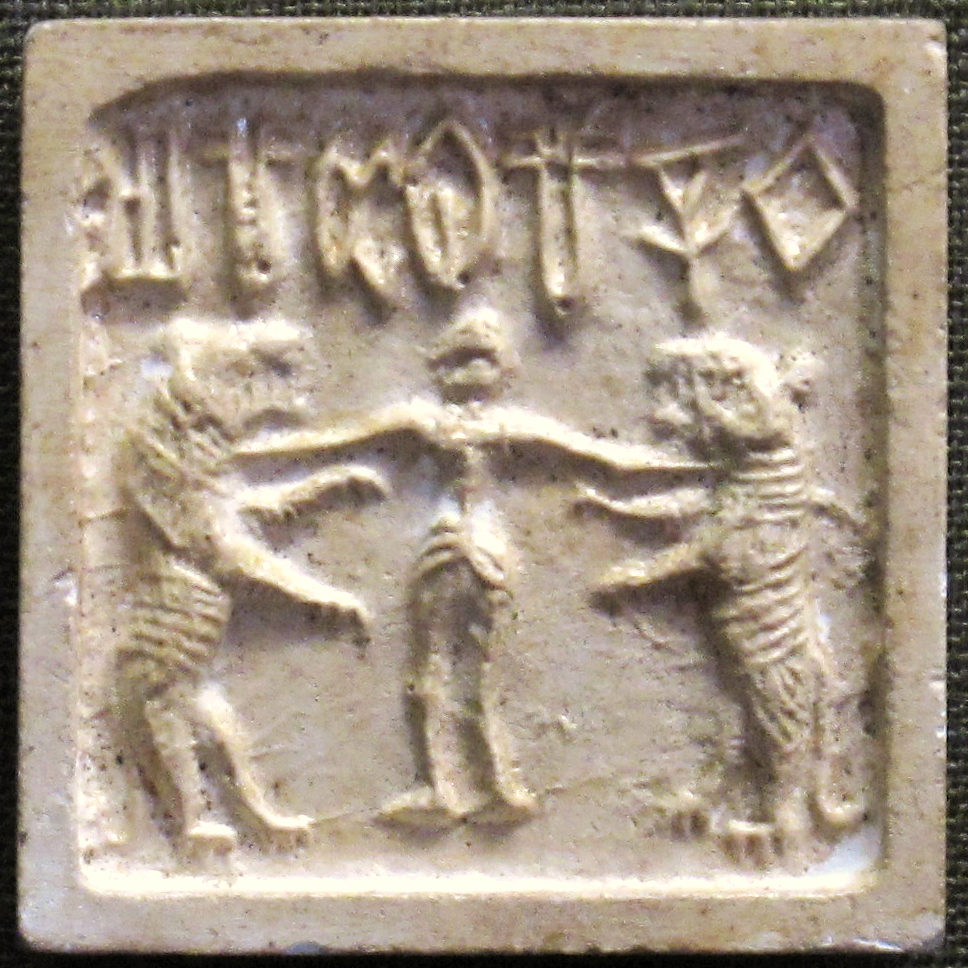
Indus valley civilization seal, with man fighting two tigers (2500–1500 BC).

Bull-man fighting beast

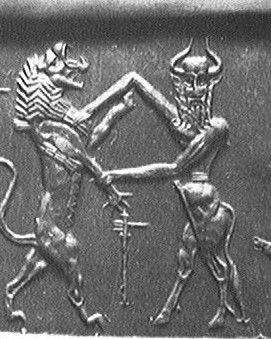
Enkidu fighting a lion, Akkadian Empire seal, Mesopotamia, circa 2200 BCE.

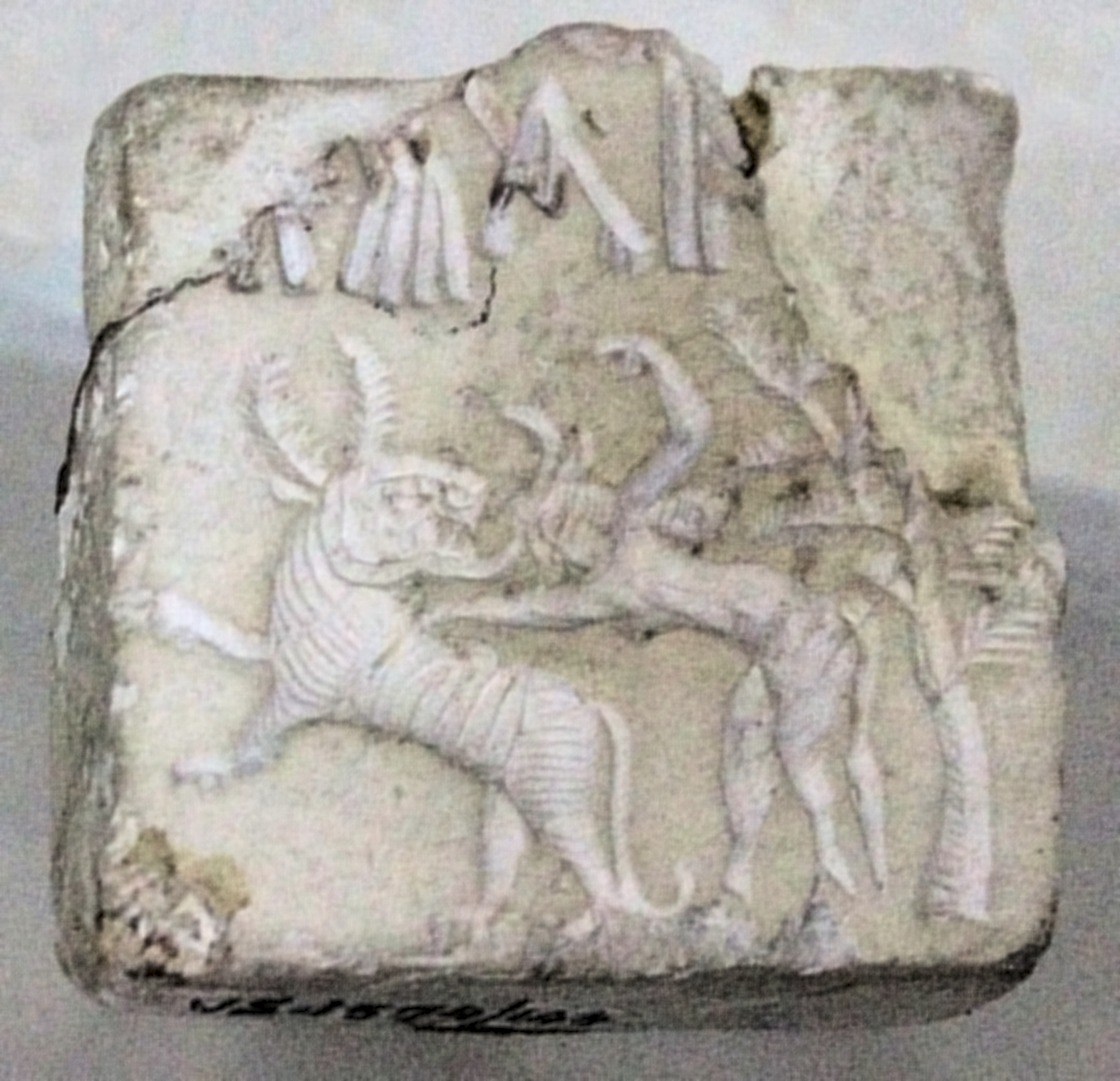
Fighting scene between a beast and a man with horns, hooves and a tail, who has been compared to the Mesopotamian bull-man Enkidu. Indus Valley civilization seal.

==== Possible iconographical influences ====
Various authors have described possible iconographical influences from Mesopotamia to the Indus Valley. Gregory Possehl notes "Mesopotamian themes in Indus iconography", particularly designs related to the Gilgamesh epic, suggesting that "some aspects of Mesopotamian religion and ideology would have been accepted at face value is a reasonable notion". Damodar Dharmananda Kosambi also describes the presence of Gilgamesh on Indus seals. In the archaeological sites of the Indus valley civilization, twenty-four stone haematite weights of the Mesopotamian barrel-shaped type were found at Mohenjo-daro and Harappa.

There are also many instances of influence the other way round, in which Indus Valley seals and designs have been found in Mesopotamia.

===== Indus Valley stamp seals =====
Some Indus seals seem to show possible Mesopotamian influence, as in the "Gilgamesh" motif of a man fighting two lions (2500–1500 BCE).

Several Indus Valley seals show a fighting scene between a tiger-like beast and a man with horns, hooves and a tail, who has been compared to the Mesopotamian bull-man Enkidu, also a partner of Gilgamesh, and suggests a transmission of Mesopotamian mythology.

===== Cylinder seals =====
A few rare cylinder seals have been found in Indus valley sites, which suggest Mesopotamian influence: they were probably made locally, but they use Mesopotamian motifs. One such cylinder seal, the Kalibangan seal, shows a battle between men in the presence of centaurs. Other seals show processions of animals.

Others have suggested that the cylinder seals show the Indus valley's influence on Mesopotamia. These may have been due to overland trade between the two cultures.

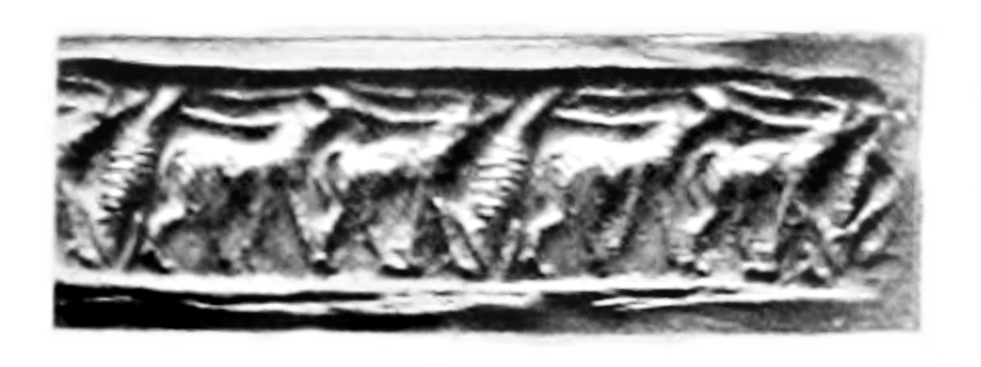
Sumerian cylinder seal with two long-horned antelopes with a tree or bush in front, excavated in Kish, Mesopotamia.

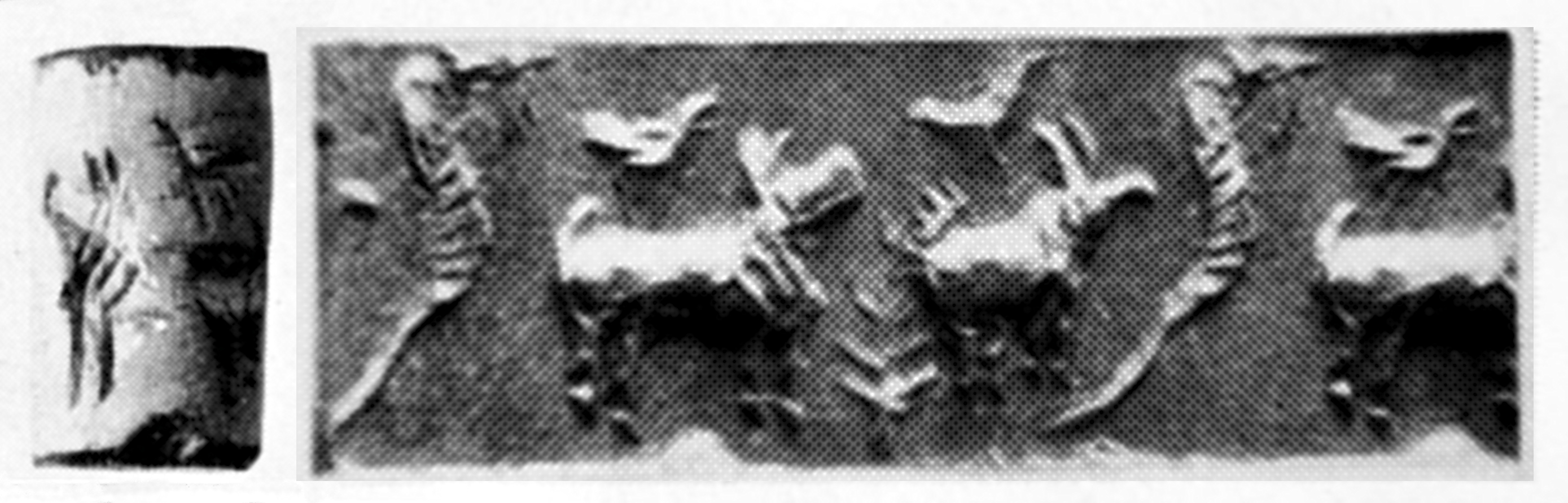
A rare Indus Valley civilization cylinder seal composed of two animals with a tree or bush in front. Such cylinder seals are indicative of contacts with Mesopotamia.

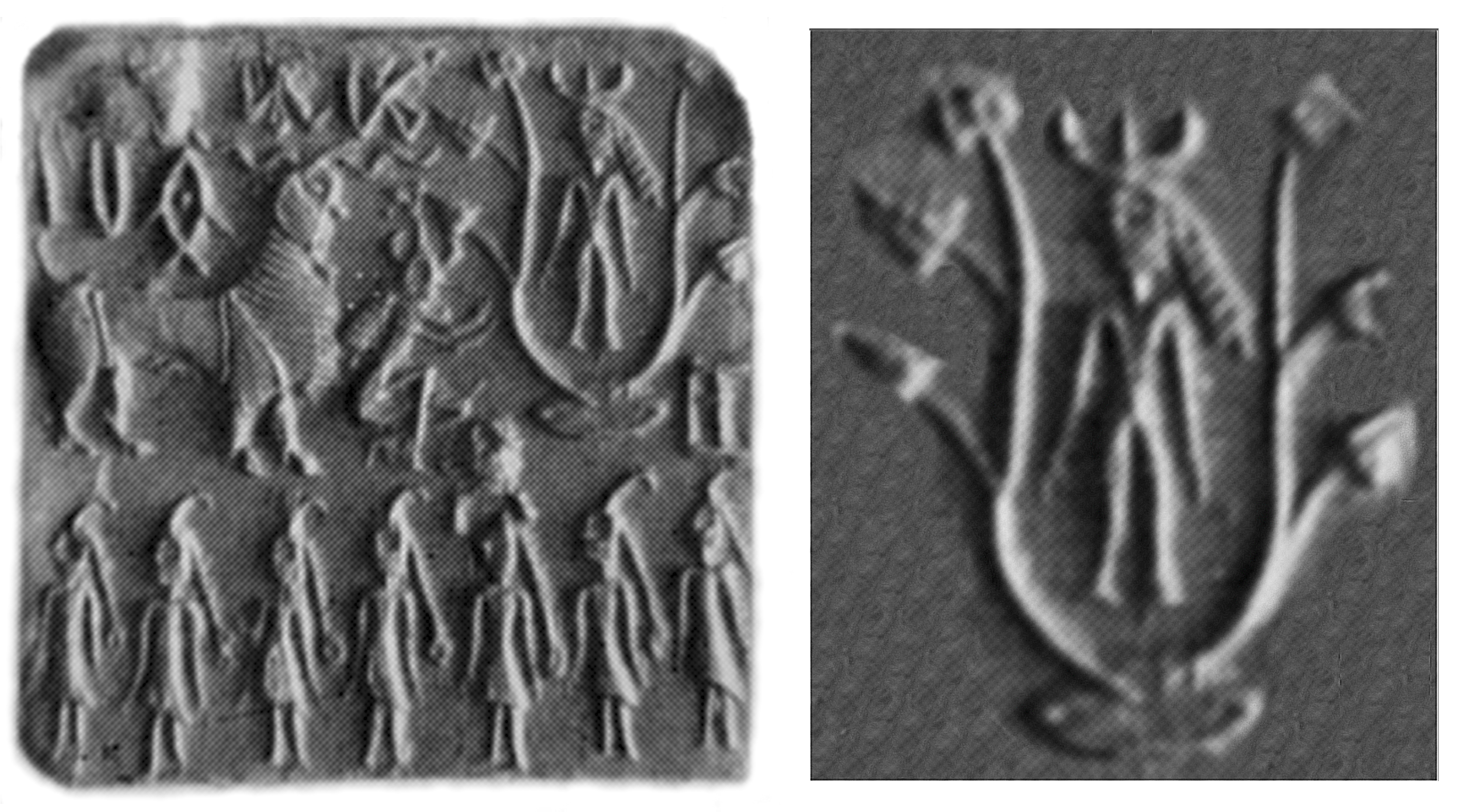
Horned deity with one-horned attendants on an Indus Valley seal. Horned deities are a standard Mesopotamian theme. 2000–1900 BCE. Islamabad Museum.

=== Indian genes in ancient Mesopotamia ===
It has long been suggested that the Sumerians, who ruled in Lower Mesopotamia from circa 4500 to 1900 BCE and who spoke a non-Indo-European and non-Semitic language, may have initially come from India. This appeared to historian Henry Hall as the most probable conclusion, particularly based on the portrayal of Sumerians in their own art and "how very Indian the Sumerians were in type". Recent genetic analysis of ancient Mesopotamian skeletal DNA tends to confirm a significant association. The Sumerians progressively lost control to Semitic states from the northwest, starting with the Akkadian Empire, from circa 2300 BCE.

==== Methodology ====
Estimated population size of 5 million.

Estimated population size of 290,000.

A genetic analysis of the ancient DNA of Mesopotamian skeletons was made on the excavated remains of four individuals from ancient tombs in Tell Ashara (ancient Terqa) and Tell Masaikh (near Terqa, also known as ancient Kar-Assurnasirpal), both in the middle Euphrates valley in the east of modern Syria. The two oldest skeletons were dated to 2,650–2,450 BCE and 2,200–1,900 BCE respectively, while the two younger skeletons were dated to circa 500 AD. All the studied individuals carried mtDNA haplotypes corresponding to the M4b1, M49 and/or M61 haplogroups, which are believed to have arisen in the area of the Indian subcontinent during the Upper Paleolithic, and are absent in people living today in Syria. These haplogroups are still present in people inhabiting today's Tibet, Himalayas (Ladakh), India and Pakistan, and are restricted today to the South, East and Southeast Asia regions. The data suggests a genetic link of the region with the Indian subcontinent in the past that has not left traces in the modern population of Mesopotamia.

Other studies have also shown connections between the populations of Mesopotamia and population groups now located in Southern India, such as the Tamils.

==== Analysis ====
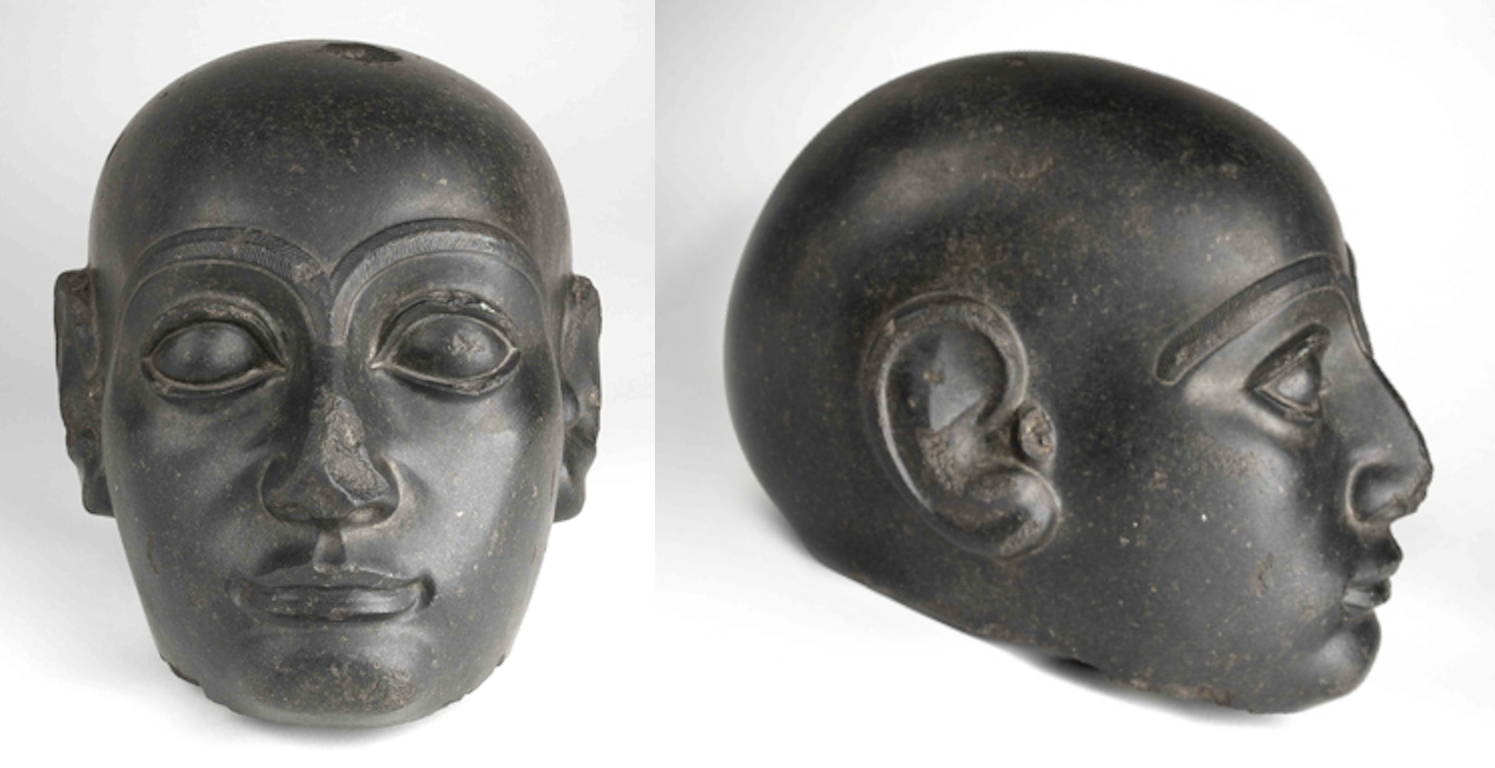
Sculpture of the head of Sumerian ruler Gudea, c. 2150 BC

The genetic analysis suggests that a continuity existed between Trans-Himalaya and Mesopotamia regions in ancient time, and that the studied individuals represent genetic associations with the Indian subcontinent. It is likely that this genetic connection was broken as a result of population movements during more recent times.

The fact that the studied individuals comprised both males and a female, each living in a different period and representing different haplotypes, suggests that the nature of their presence in Mesopotamia was long-lasting rather than incidental. The close ancestors of the specimens could fall within the population founding Terqa, a historical site that was probably constructed during the early Bronze Age, at a time only slightly preceding the dating of the skeletons.

The studied individuals could also have been the descendants of much earlier migration waves who brought these genes from the Indian subcontinent. It cannot be excluded that among them were people involved in the founding of the Mesopotamian civilizations. For instance, it is commonly accepted that the founders of Sumerian civilization may have come from outside the region, but their exact origin is still a matter of debate. The migrants could have entered Mesopotamia earlier than 4,500 years ago, during the lifetime of the oldest studied individual. Alternatively, the studied individuals may have belonged to groups of itinerant merchants moving along a trade route passing near or through the region.

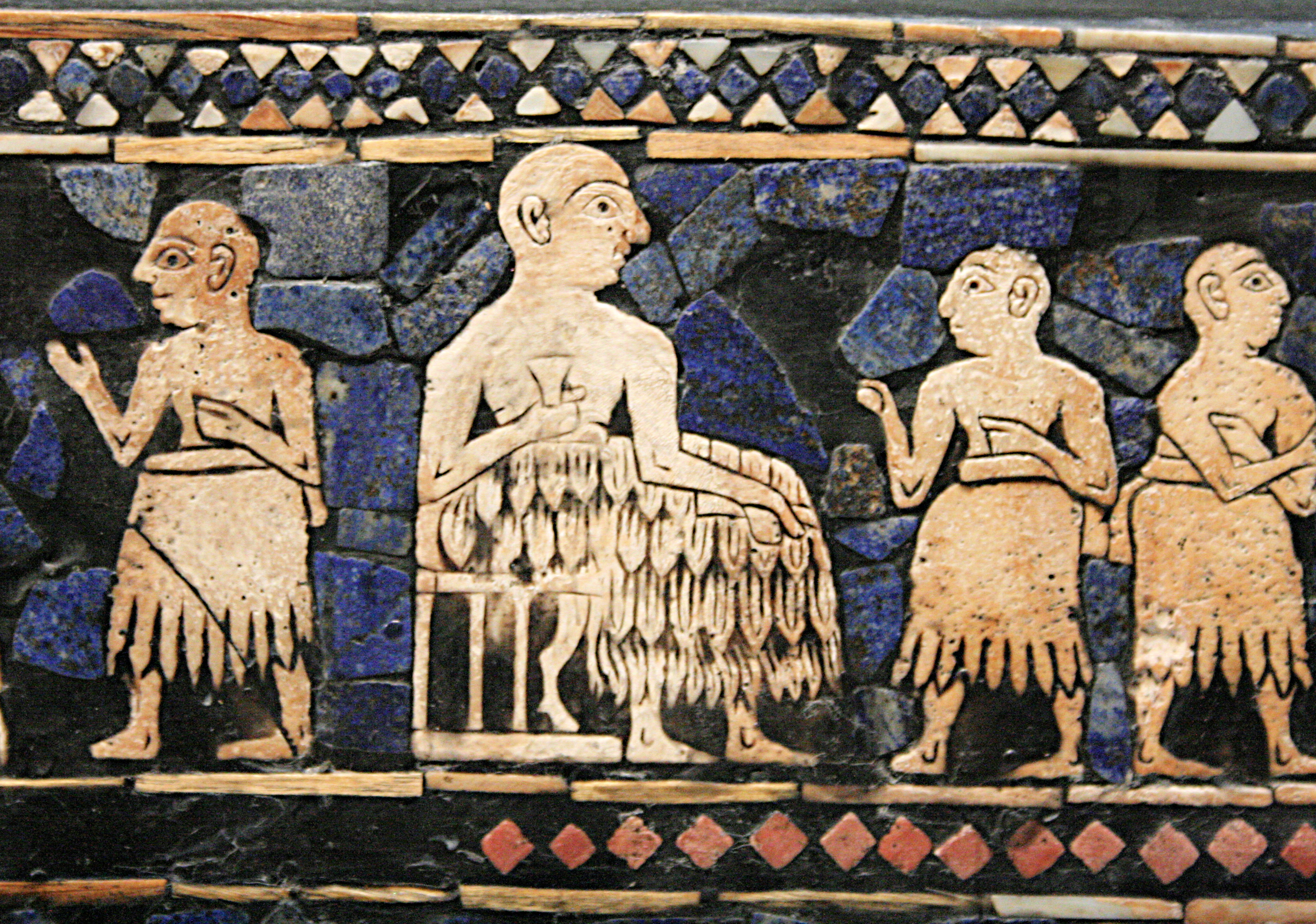
Enthroned Sumerian king of Ur, with attendants. Standard of Ur, c. 2600 BCE.

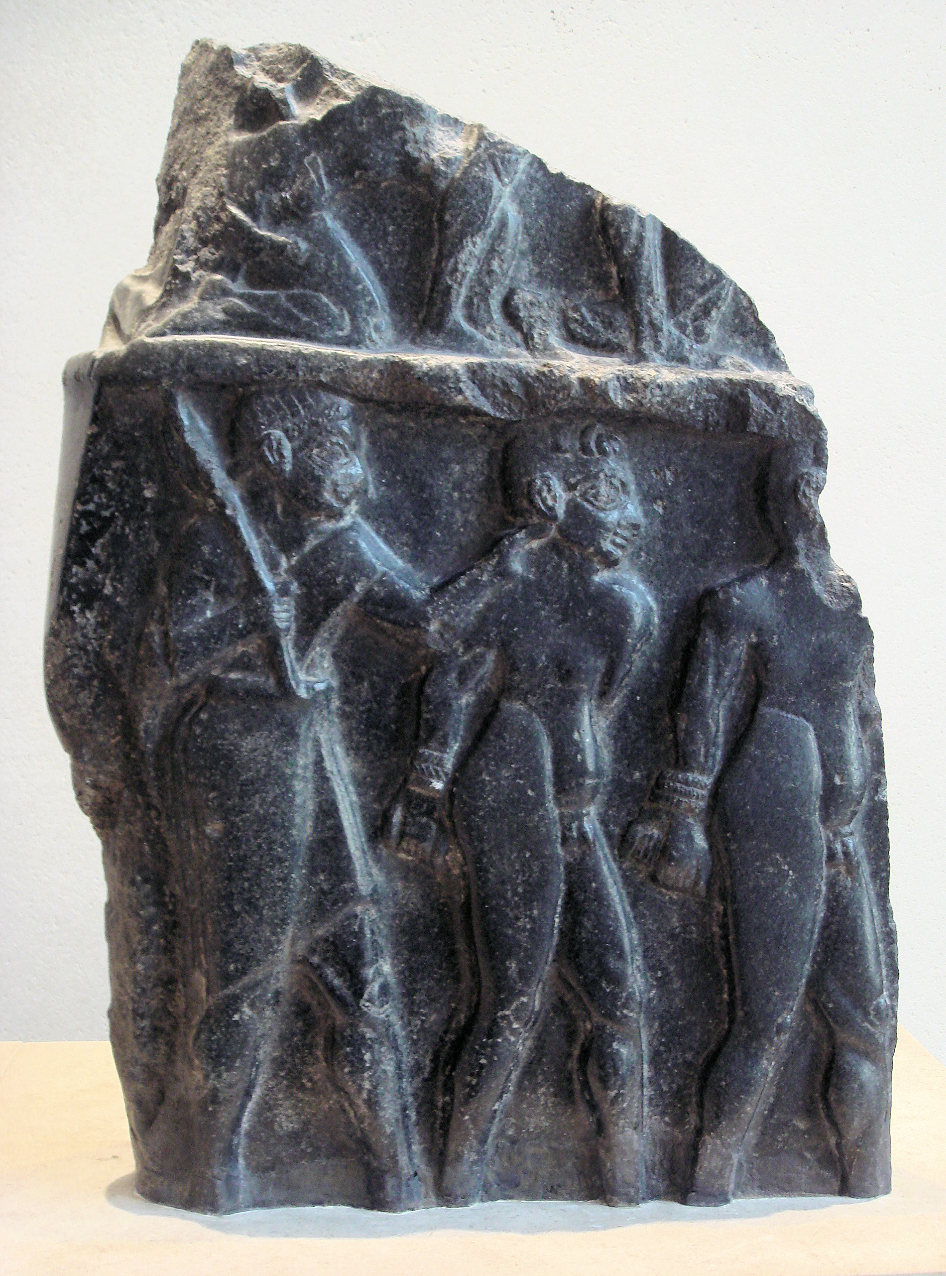
Sumerian prisoners on a victory stele of Akkadian king Sargon, circa 2300 BCE. Louvre Museum.

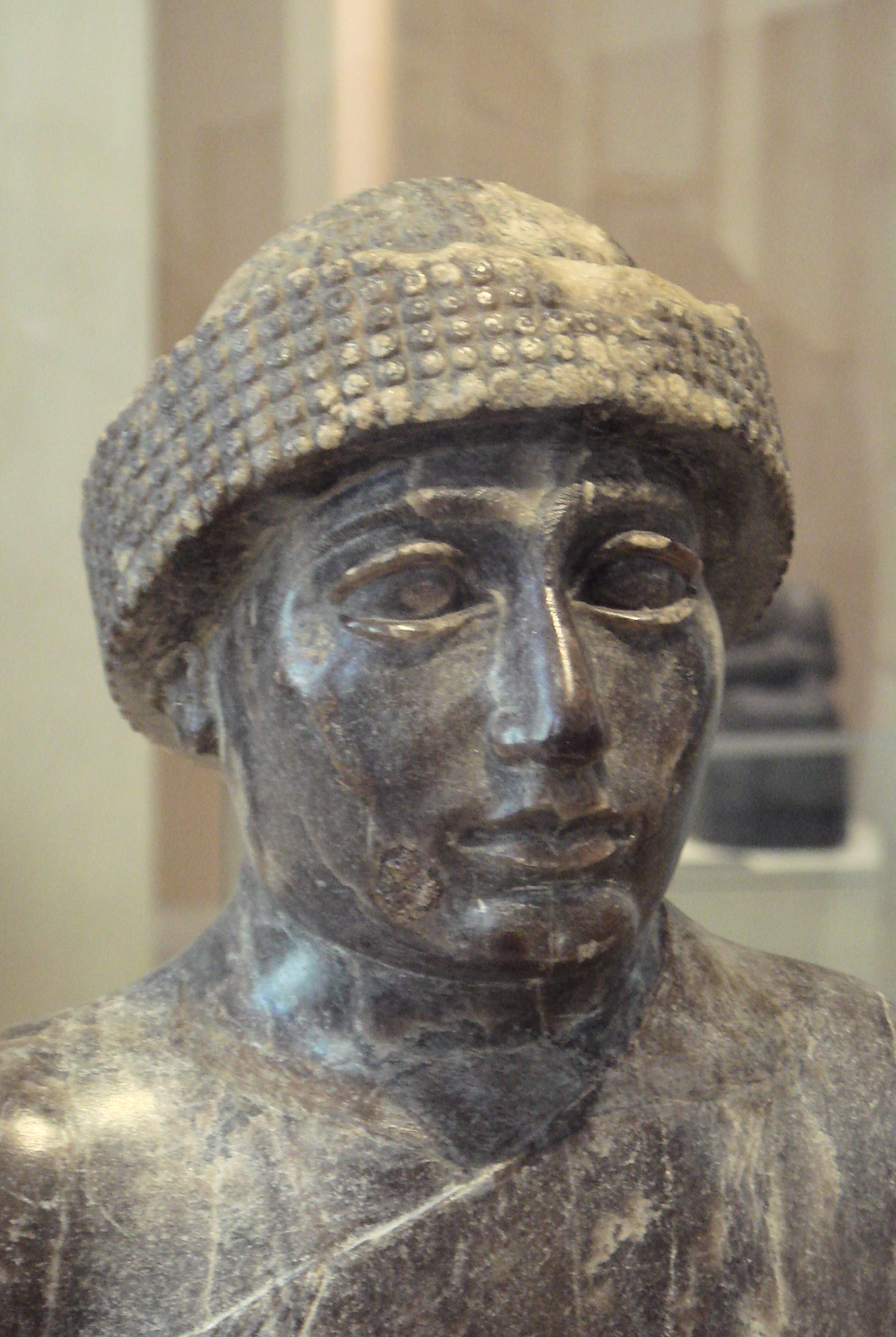
Portrait of Sumerian ruler Ur-Ningirsu, son of Gudea, c.2100 BCE. Louvre Museum.

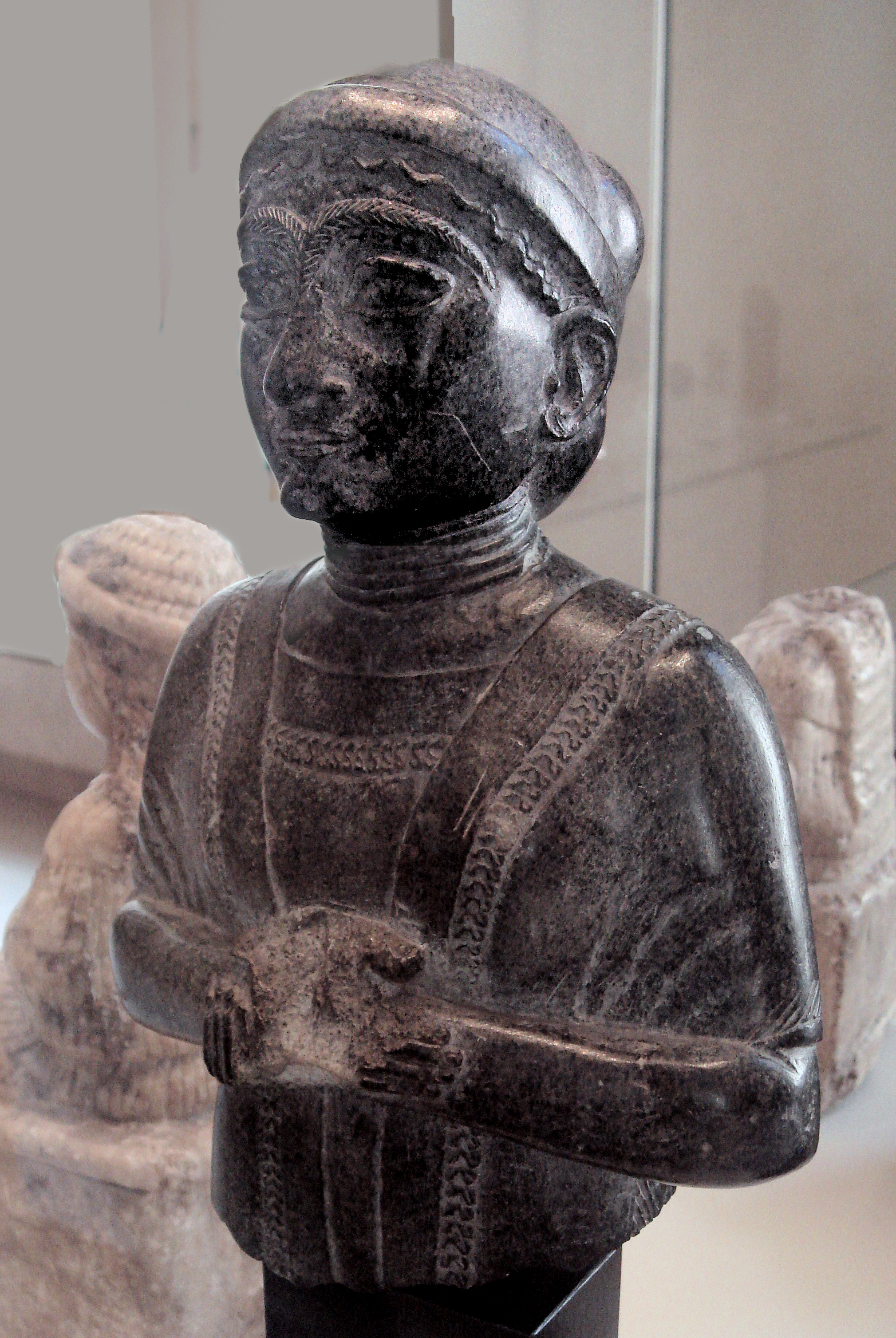
Sumerian princess of the time of Gudea circa 2150 BCE.

=== Scripts and languages ===
Mesopotamian "Meluhha" seal

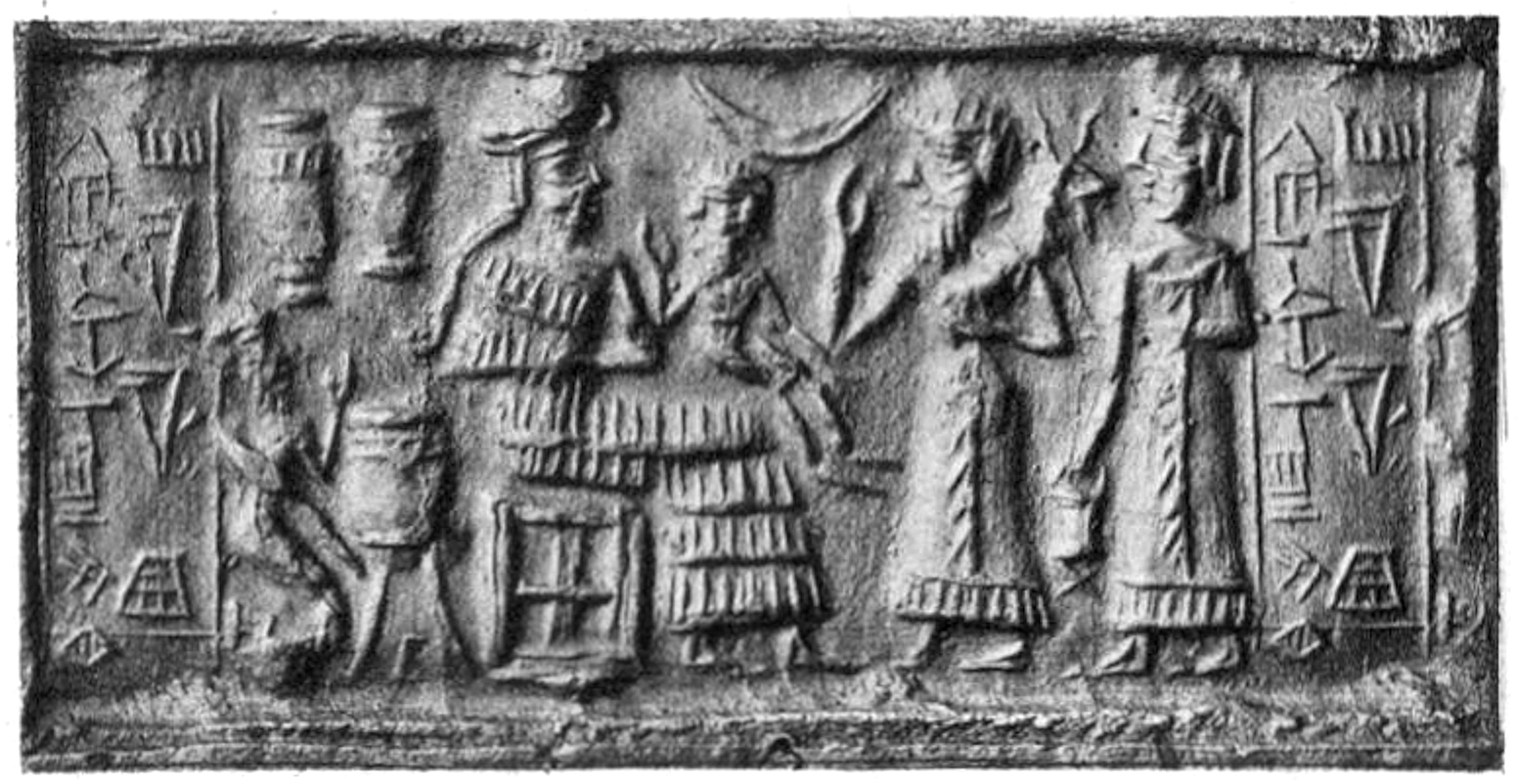
The seal

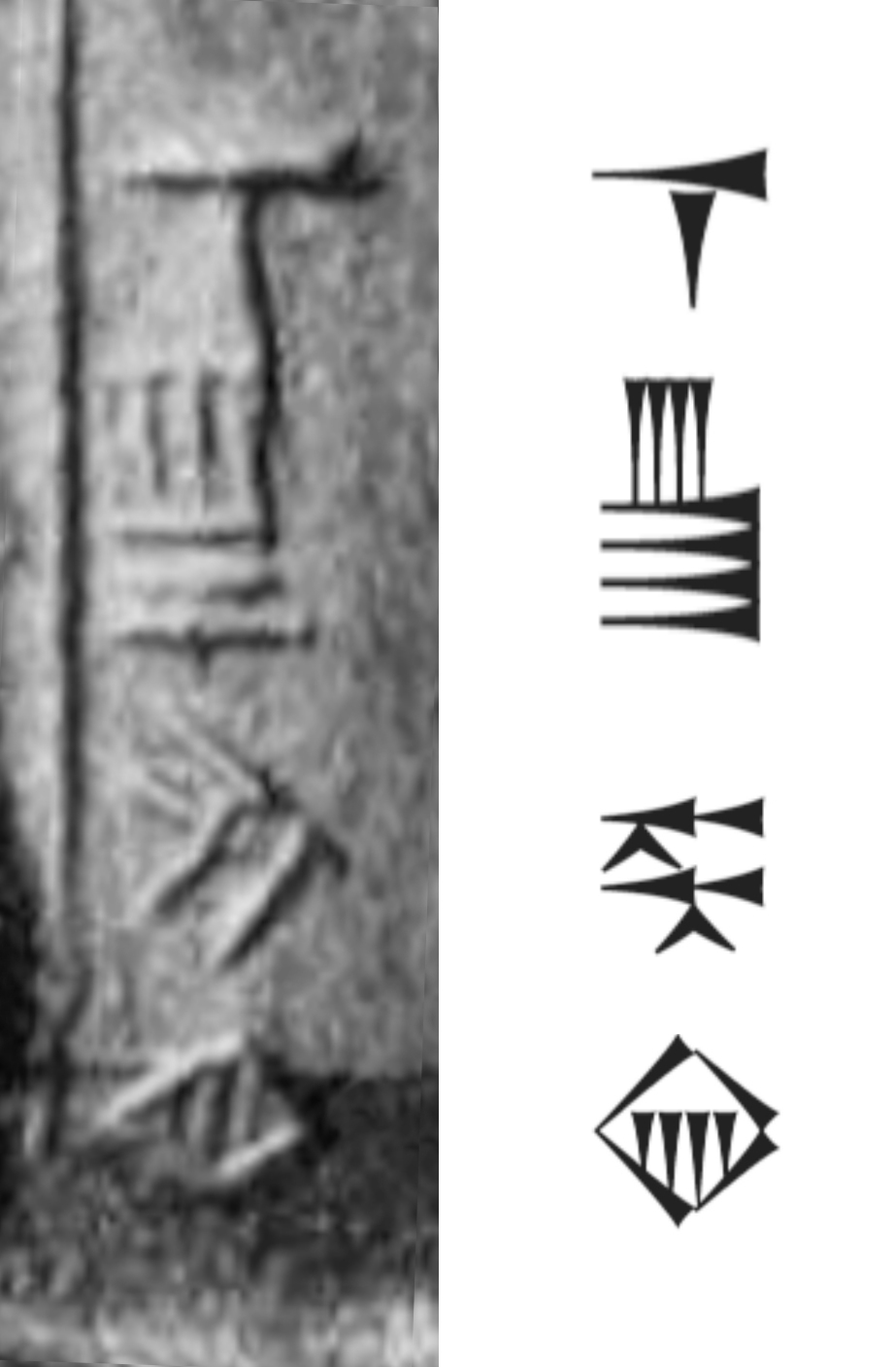
"Meluhha"

Akkadian Empire cylinder seal with inscription: "Shu-ilishu, interpreter of the language of Meluhha": "Meluhha" appears with the standard cuneiform as 𒈨𒈛𒄩𒆠 (Me-luh-ha^{KI}, "KI" standing for "country"). Louvre Museum, reference AO 22310.

Similarities between Proto-Elamite (circa 3000 BCE) and especially Linear Elamite (2300–2000 BCE) scripts with the Indus script have been noted, although it has not been possible to decipher any of them. Elamite only starts to be readable from around 2300 BCE, when Elamite adopted the cuneiform system. These Elamite scripts are said to be "technically similar" to the Indus script. On comparing the Linear Elamite to the Indus script, a number of similar symbols have also been found.

The Meluhhan language was not readily understandable at the Akkadian court, since interpretators of the Meluhhan language are known to have resided in Mesopotamia, particularly through an Akkadian seal with the inscription "Shu-ilishu, interpreter of the Meluhhan language".

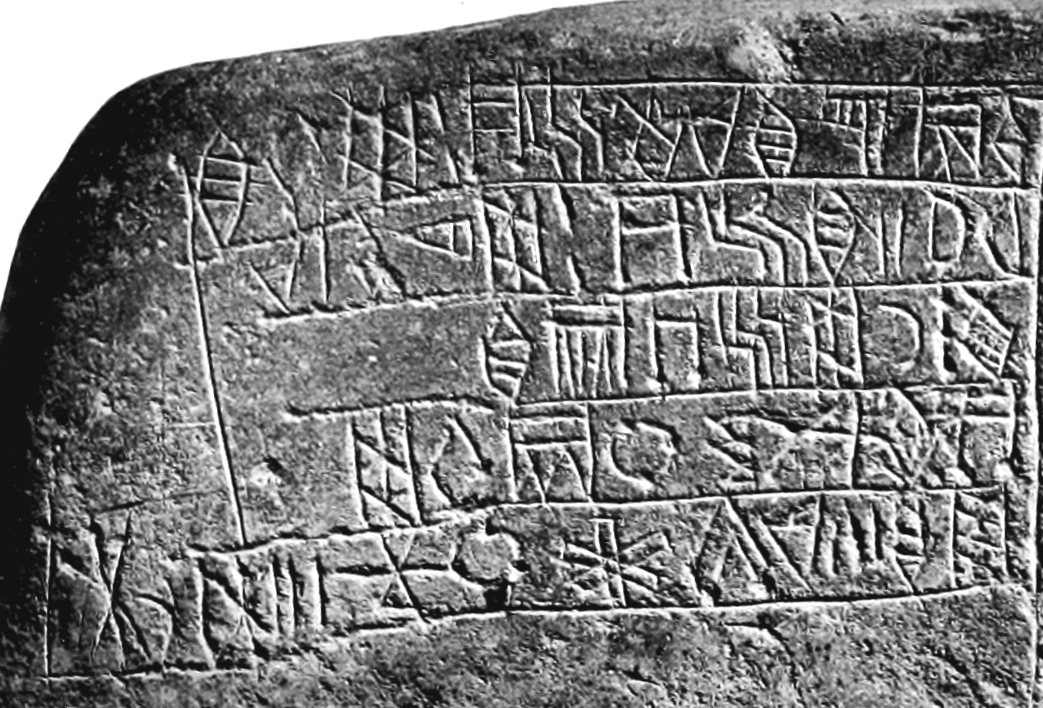
Linear Elamite inscription the "Table of the Lion", time of king Kutik-Inshushinak, Louvre Museum Sb 17.

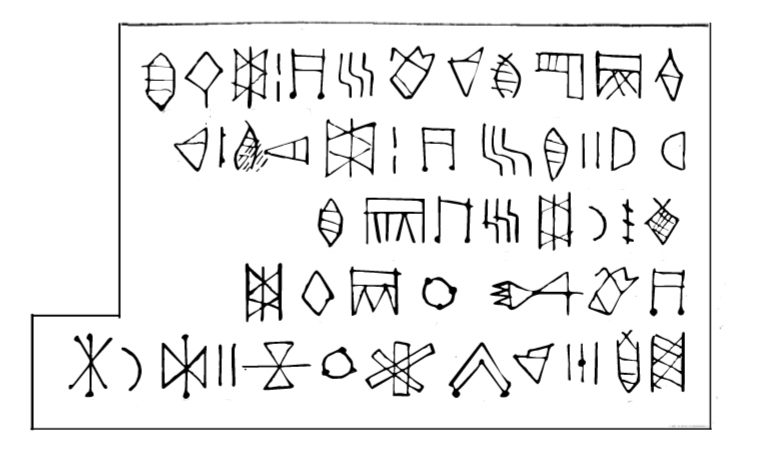
Transcription of the "Table of the Lion" Linear Elamite text.

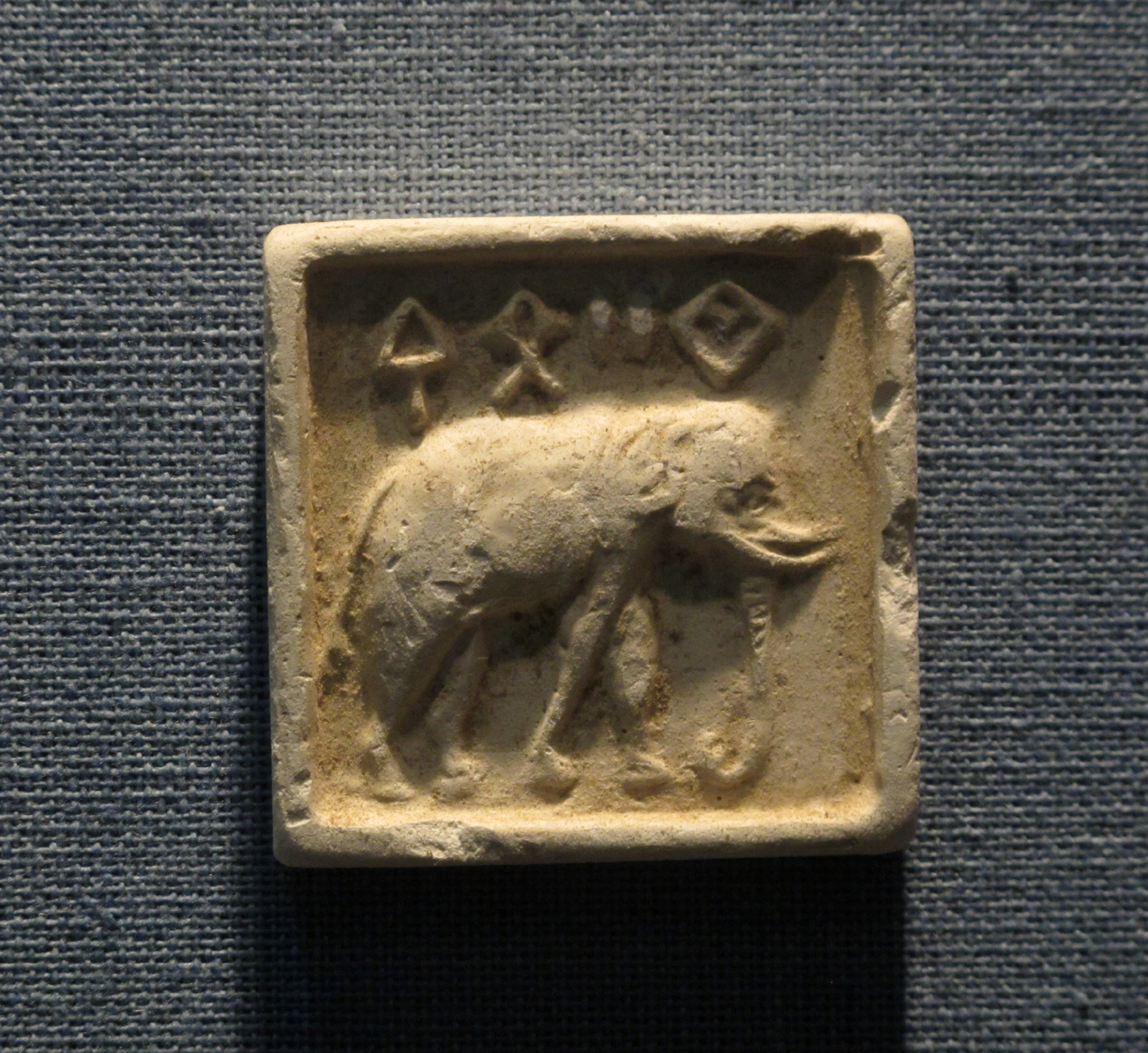
A seal with an inscription in the Indus script.

== Chronology ==
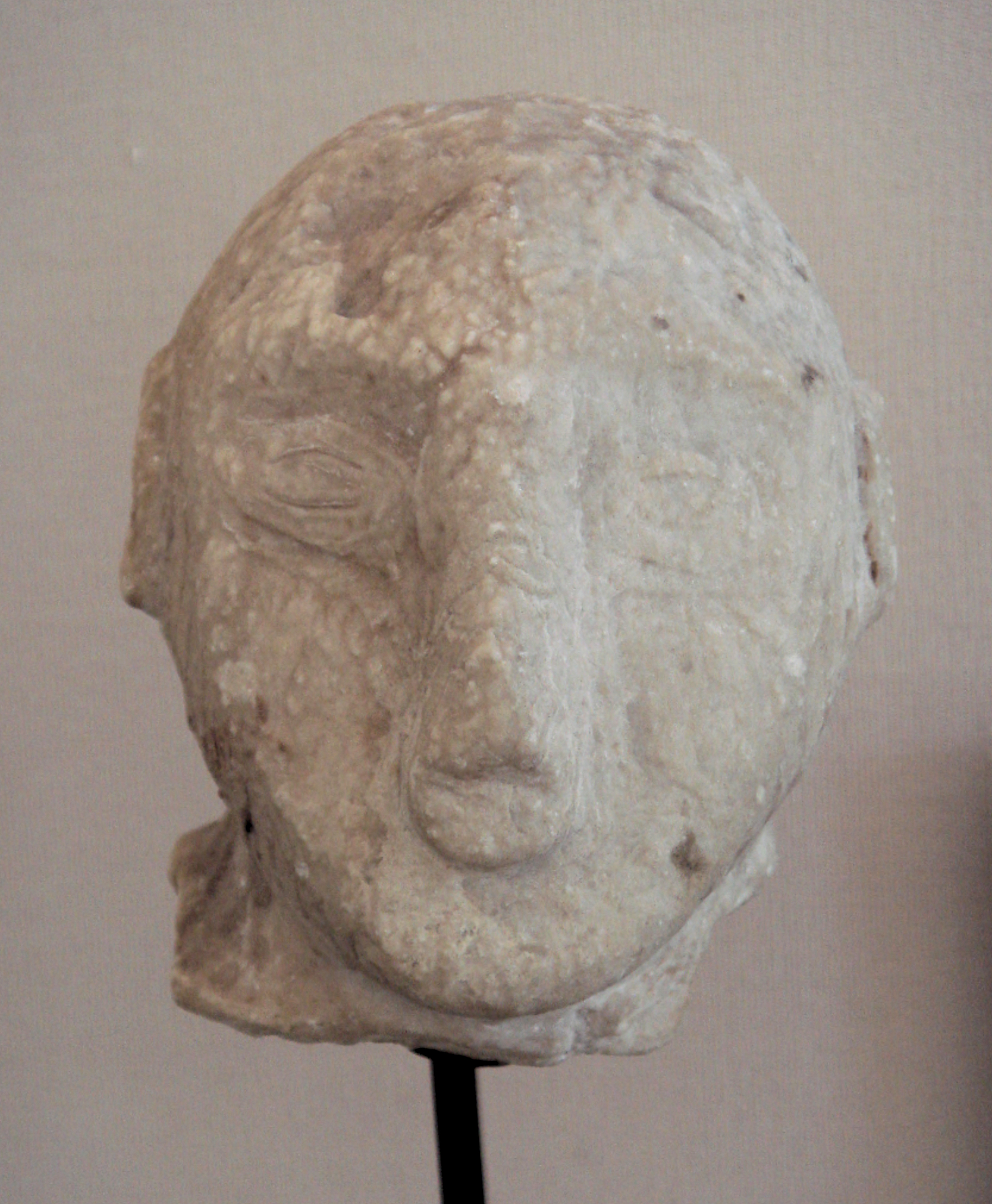
Indus-type statuette, found in Susa in the 2600–1700 BCE site of the Tel of the Acropolis at Susa. Louvre Museum, reference Sb 80.

Etched carnelian beads

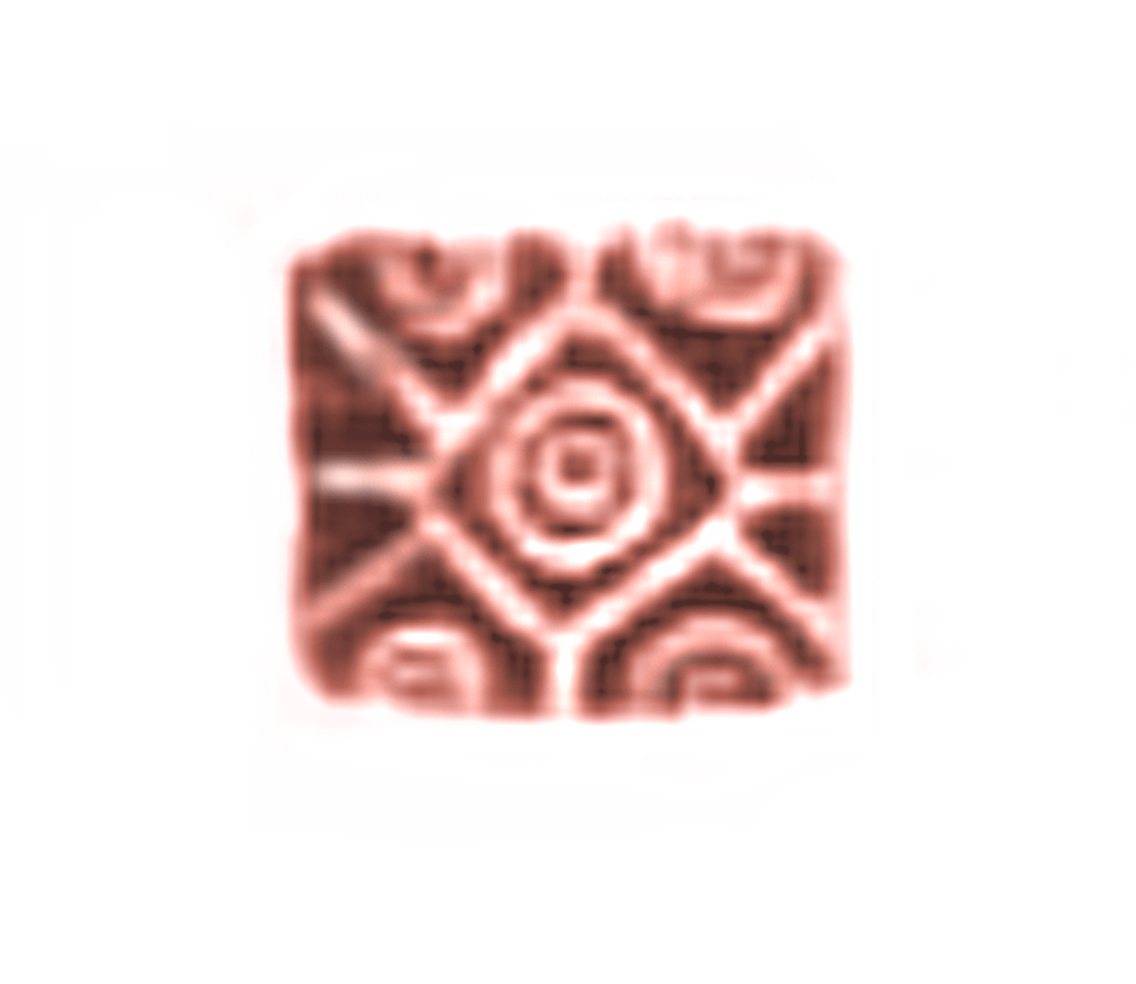
Indus valley civilization etched carnelian bead, excavated in Mohenjo-daro.

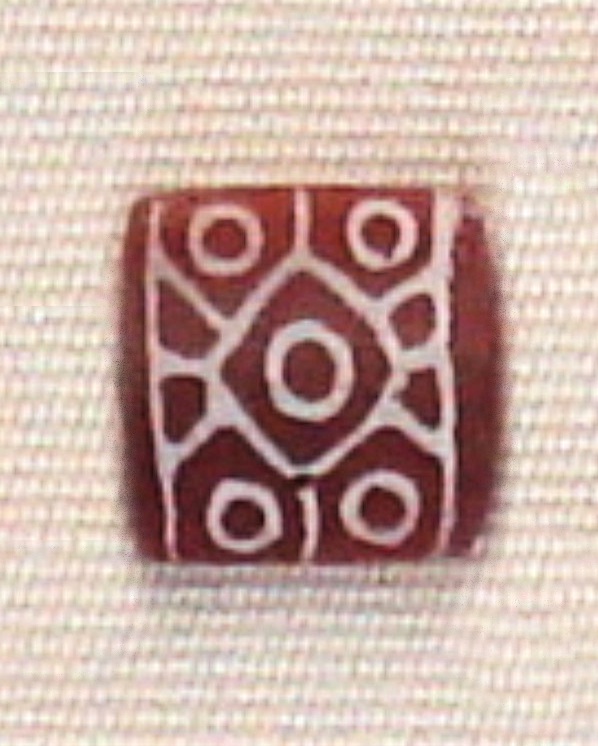
Etched carnelian bead excavated in Susa, dated 2600–1700 BCE.

Sargon of Akkad (circa 2300 or 2250 BCE), was the first Mesopotamian ruler to make an explicit reference to the region of Meluhha, which is generally understood as being the Baluchistan or the Indus area. Sargon mentions the presence of Meluhha, Magan, and Dilmun ships at Akkad.

These dates correspond roughly to the Mature Harappan phase, dated from around 2600 to 2000 BCE. The dates for the main occupation of Mohenjo-Daro are from about 2350 to 2000/1900 BCE.

It has been suggested that the early Mesopotamian Empire preceded the emergence of the Harappan civilization, and that trade and cultural exchanges may have facilitated the emergence of Harappan culture. Alternatively, it is possible that the Harappan culture had already emerged by the time trade with Mesopotamia started. Uncertainties in dating make it impossible to establish a clear order at this stage.

Exchanges seem to have been most significant during the Akkadian Empire and Ur III periods, and to have waned afterwards together with the disappearance of the Indus valley civilization.

=== Comparative sizes ===
The Indus Valley Civilization only flourished in its most developed form between 2500 and 1800 BCE until it became extinct, but at the time of these exchanges, it was a much larger entity than the Mesopotamian civilization, covering an area of 1.2 million square kilometres with thousands of settlements, compared to an area of only about 65,000 square kilometres for the occupied area of Mesopotamia, while the largest cities were comparable in size at about 30,000–40,000 inhabitants.

There were altogether about 1,500 Indus valley cities, amounting to a population of perhaps 5 million at the maximum time of their florescence. In contrast, the total urban population of Mesopotamia in 2,500 BCE was around 290,000.

Large-scale exchanges recovered with the Achaemenid conquest of the Indus Valley, circa 500 BCE.

== Views of cultural diffusion ==
Many scholars have pointed towards exaggerated notions of cultural diffusions from Western Asia to the Indian subcontinent, such as when overlinking Vedic astronomy and mathematics to Sumerian origins. Likewise scholars have questioned the supposed borrowings of Western Asian motifs without the evidence of any actual artifact and trade contacts. Recent archaeogenetic research based on DNA samples collected from the Harappan site of Rakhigarhi suggests that Western Asian migration to northern India occurred as early as 12,000 years ago, but that the rise of agriculture in India was a later phenomenon, probably due to cultural exchanges around 2,000 years later, rather than direct migration. According to Richard H. Meadow, evidence gathered from Mehrgarh points towards domestication of sheep, cattle and goats as a separate local phenomenon in the subcontinent around 7,000 BCE.

== See also ==
- Ancient Greece–Ancient India relations
- Buddhism and the Roman world
- Economic history of India
- Historic GDP of India (1–1947 CE)
- Indo-Roman trade relations
- Indian maritime history
- Jiroft culture
- Meluhha trade with Sumer
- Tamil loanwords in Biblical Hebrew

== Sources ==
- Dikshit, K.N. (2013), "Origin of Early Harappan Cultures in the Sarasvati Valley: Recent Archaeological Evidence and Radiometric Dates" (PDF), Journal of Indian Ocean Archaeology (9), archived from the original (PDF) on 2017-01-18
- Gadd, G. J. (1958). Seals of Ancient Indian style found at Ur.
- Mani, B.R. (2008), "Kashmir Neolithic and Early Harappan: A Linkage" (PDF), Pragdhara 18, 229–247 (2008), archived from the original (PDF) on 18 January 2017
- Art of the first cities: the third millennium B.C. from the Mediterranean to the Indus. Metropolitan Museum of Art.

== Bibliography ==
- Coningham, Robin; Young, Ruth (2015), The Archaeology of South Asia: From the Indus to Asoka, c. 6500 BCE – 200 CE, Cambridge University Press
- Dyson, Tim (2018). A Population History of India: From the First Modern People to the Present Day. Oxford University Press. ISBN 978-0-19-882905-8.
- Gallego Romero, Irene; et al. (2011), "Herders of Indian and European Cattle Share their Predominant Allele for Lactase Persistence", Mol. Biol. Evol., 29 (1): 249–260, doi:10.1093/molbev/msr190, PMID 21836184
- Gangal, Kavita; Sarson, Graeme R.; Shukurov, Anvar (2014), "The Near-Eastern roots of the Neolithic in South Asia", PLOS ONE, 9 (5) e95714, Bibcode:2014PLoSO...995714G, doi:10.1371/journal.pone.0095714, PMC 4012948, PMID 24806472
- Mascarenhas, Desmond D.; Raina, Anupuma; Aston, Christopher E.; Sanghera, Dharambir K. (2015), "Genetic and Cultural Reconstruction of the Migration of an Ancient Lineage", BioMed Research International, 2015: 1–16, doi:10.1155/2015/651415, PMC 4605215, PMID 26491681
- Narasimhan, Vagheesh M.; Anthony, David; Mallory, James; Reich, David (2019). "The formation of human populations in South and Central Asia". Science. 365 (6457) eaat7487. Bibcode:2019Sci...365t7487N. bioRxiv 10.1101/292581. doi:10.1126/science.aat7487. PMC 6822619. PMID 31488661.
- Parpola, Asko (2015), The Roots of Hinduism. The Early Aryans and the Indus Civilisation, Oxford University Press
- Singh, Sakshi (2016), "Dissecting the influence of Neolithic demic diffusion on Indian Y-chromosome pool through J2-M172 haplogroup", Scientific Reports, 6 19157, Bibcode:2016NatSR...619157S, doi:10.1038/srep19157, PMC 4709632, PMID 26754573
