= Dorothy Mackay =

British archaeologist

Dorothy Mary Mackay
- Born: Dorothy Mary Simmons; 11 November 1881; Croydon, England
- Died: 8 February 1953 (aged 71); Beaconsfield, England
- Education: University of London
- Alma mater: University College London
- Occupations: Archaeologist, museum curator
- Spouse: Ernest J. H. Mackay

Dorothy Mary Mackay (née Simmons, 11 November 1881 – 8 February 1953) was a British archaeologist who worked in Egypt, Iraq, and sites of the Indus Valley Civilisation.

== Personal life ==
Mackay was born Dorothy Mary Simmons at Croydon in 1881. She studied Greek and French at the University of London, graduating in 1902. She continued taking classes in botany, calculus, geology and zoology, gaining enough credits to graduate with a degree in zoology by 1909.

She was a member of the Croydon Branch of the Women's Social and Political Union.

In 1912, she married fellow archaeologist Ernest J. H. Mackay, with whom she often collaborated in later years.

== Career ==
In 1940, Mackay was appointed assistant keeper at the Department of Antiquities, Ashmolean Museum in Oxford, and between 1948–1951 she acted as curator at the Archaeological Museum of the American University of Beirut.

== Publications ==
- "Ancient Cities of Iraq. A Practical Handbook". Baghdad, K. Mackenzie. 1926.
- Mohenjo-daro. Bombay: Indian State Railways Publicity Department. 1929.
- "Beads from Taxila". Antiquity, 18(72). pp. 201–204. 1944.
- "Ancient River Beds and Dead Cities". Antiquity, 19(75). pp. 135–144. 1945.
- "The jewellery of Palmyra and its significance." Iraq 11(2). pp. 160–187. 1949.
- "A Guide to the Archaeological Collections in the University Museum". 1951. Beirut: American University of Beirut
- Mudun al-‘Iraq al-qadima. Transl. by Y.J. Miscony. Baghdad: ʻAhd Bagdad. 1952
