= Ernest J. H. Mackay =

British archaeologist (1880–1943)

- Ernest Mackay, Archeologist
- Born: Ernest John Henry Mackay; 5 July 1880; Bristol, England
- Died: 2 October 1943 (aged 63); London, England
- Other names: Mackay
- Occupation: Archaeologist
- Known for: Excavation at Mohenje-daro
- Spouse: Dorothy Mackay

Ernest John Henry Mackay (5 July 1880 – 2 October 1943) was a British archeologist from Bristol known for his excavations and studies of Mohenjo-daro and other sites belonging to the Indus Valley Civilisation.

== Early life ==
Ernest John Henry Mackay was born in Bristol. He had attended Bristol Grammar School and Bristol University securing BA, MA and DLitt.

He married Dorothy Mackay (née Simmons), a UCL graduate with a BA degree and a BSc degree in Zoology, in 1912. They had two sons. Dorothy frequently took part in her husband's excavations and published extensively on her own.

Between 1907 and 1912, Mackay carried out archaeological excavations in Egypt and then spent three years on a photographic survey of the Theban Tombs.

During the First World War, Mackay served as a captain in the Royal Army Medical Corps in Egypt and Palestine with the Imperial Camel Corps. In 1919, he was a member of an Army Commission for the survey of ancient monuments in Palestine and Syria. From 1919 to 1922, he was Custodian of Antiquities for the Palestine government.

== Indus Valley Civilization ==
Mackay is well known for his excavations at Mohenjo-daro (during 2500 BC and 1900 BC). He did major excavations at this site from 1926 to 1931 and published detailed site report during 1936-37, which was published during 1942. He also did planning of excavation of Chanhudaro, along with W.Norman Brown and visited Chanhudaro in 1935-36 along with his wife.

== Books ==
- Chanhu-daro excavation, 1935-36. Pub. June 1942
- Indus Civilisation
- City of Shepherd Kings and Ancient Gaza V (British School Archaeology in Egypt). With W.M.Flinders Petrie
- Further Excavations At Mohenjo-daro

== Article ==
- E.J.H. Mackay (1920). "Observations on a megalithic building at Bet Sawir (Palestine)". Journal of the Palestine Oriental Society. 1: 95–102.

== Death ==
He had died on 2 October 1943 on age of 63 years in London, England.
