= Egypt–Mesopotamia relations =

Middle Eastern international relations

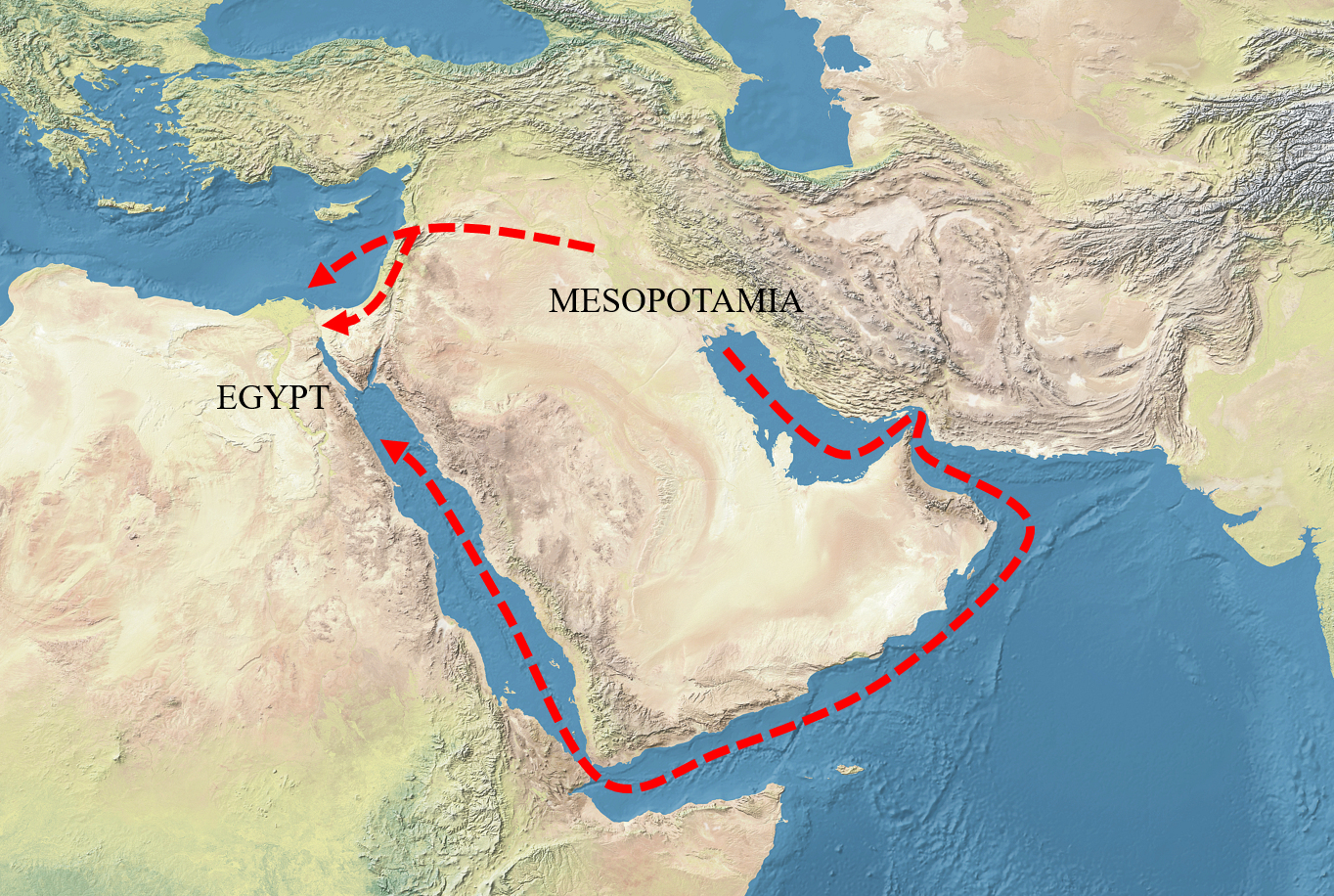
Possible Mesopotamia–Egypt trade routes from the 4th millennium BCE.

Egypt–Mesopotamia relations were the relations between the civilizations of ancient Egypt and Mesopotamia, in the Middle East. They seem to have developed from the 4th millennium BCE, starting in the Uruk period for Mesopotamia (circa 4000–3100 BCE) and the half a millennium younger Gerzean culture of Prehistoric Egypt (circa 3500–3200 BCE), and constituted a largely one way body of influences from Mesopotamia into Egypt.

Prior to a specific Mesopotamian influence there had already been a longstanding influence from West Asia into Egypt, North Africa and even into some parts of the Horn of Africa and the Sahel in the form of the Neolithic Revolution which from circa 9000 BCE diffused advanced agricultural practices and technology, gene-flow, certain domesticated animals and crops and the likely spread of Proto-Afroasiatic language into the region, with Semitic languages that had evolved in West Asia circa 4000 BCE being introduced via the Arabian Peninsula and Levant into the Horn of Africa and North Africa respectively after 1000 BCE.

Mesopotamian influences can be seen in the visual arts of Egypt, in architecture, in technology, weaponry, in imported products, religious imagery, economic practices, in agriculture and livestock, in genetic input, and also in the likely transfer of writing from Mesopotamia to Egypt and generated "deep-seated" parallels in the early stages of both cultures. A similar Mesopotamian influence during this period is seen in Elam in Ancient Iran, the Levant, Anatolia and northern parts of the Arabian Peninsula.

== Influences on Egyptian trade and art (3500–3200 BCE) ==
Mesopotamian king on Egyptian prehistoric knife
(3300–3200 BCE)

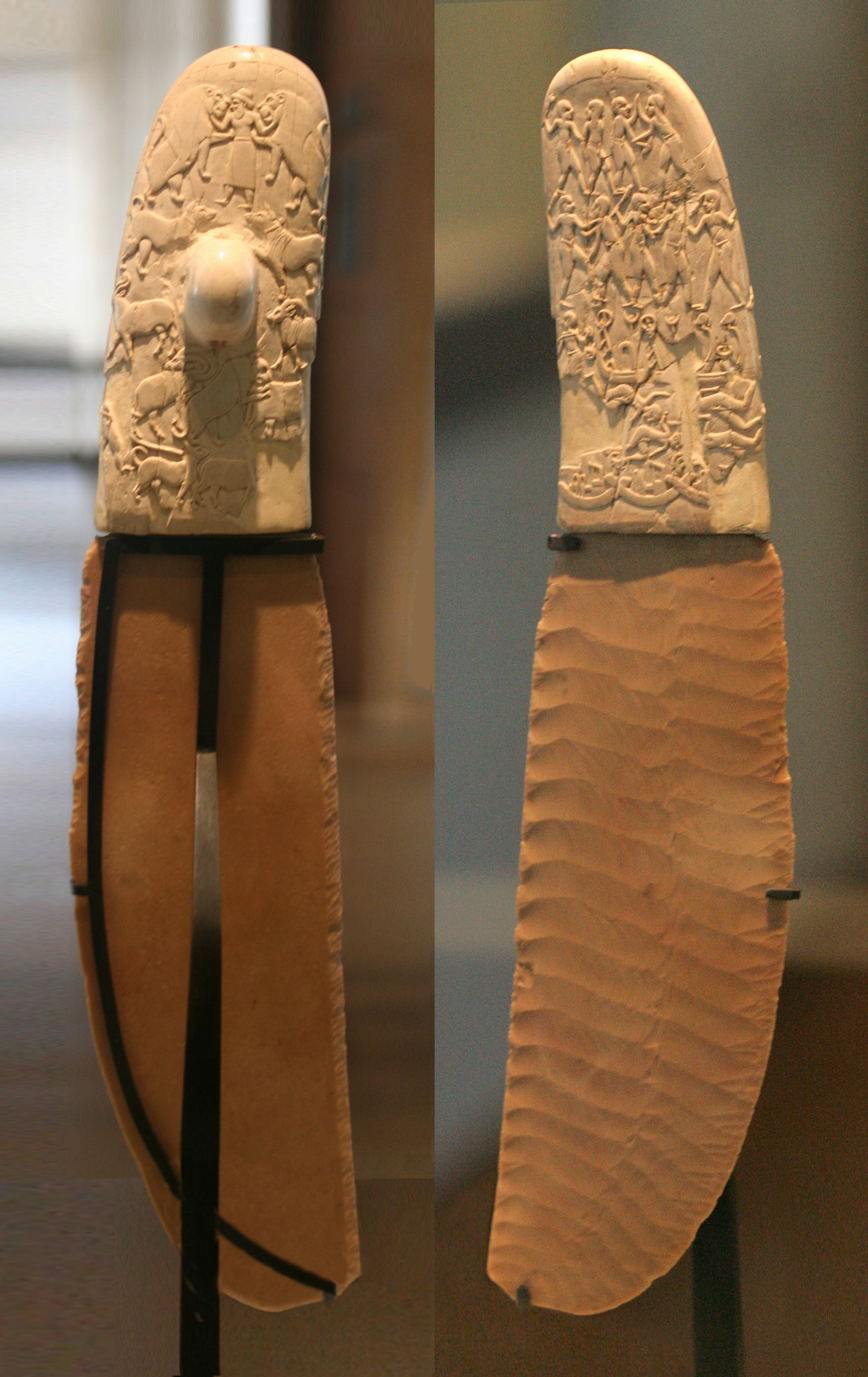
Egyptian pre-historic Gebel el-Arak Knife. Dated 3300–3200 BCE, Abydos, Egypt. Louvre Museum

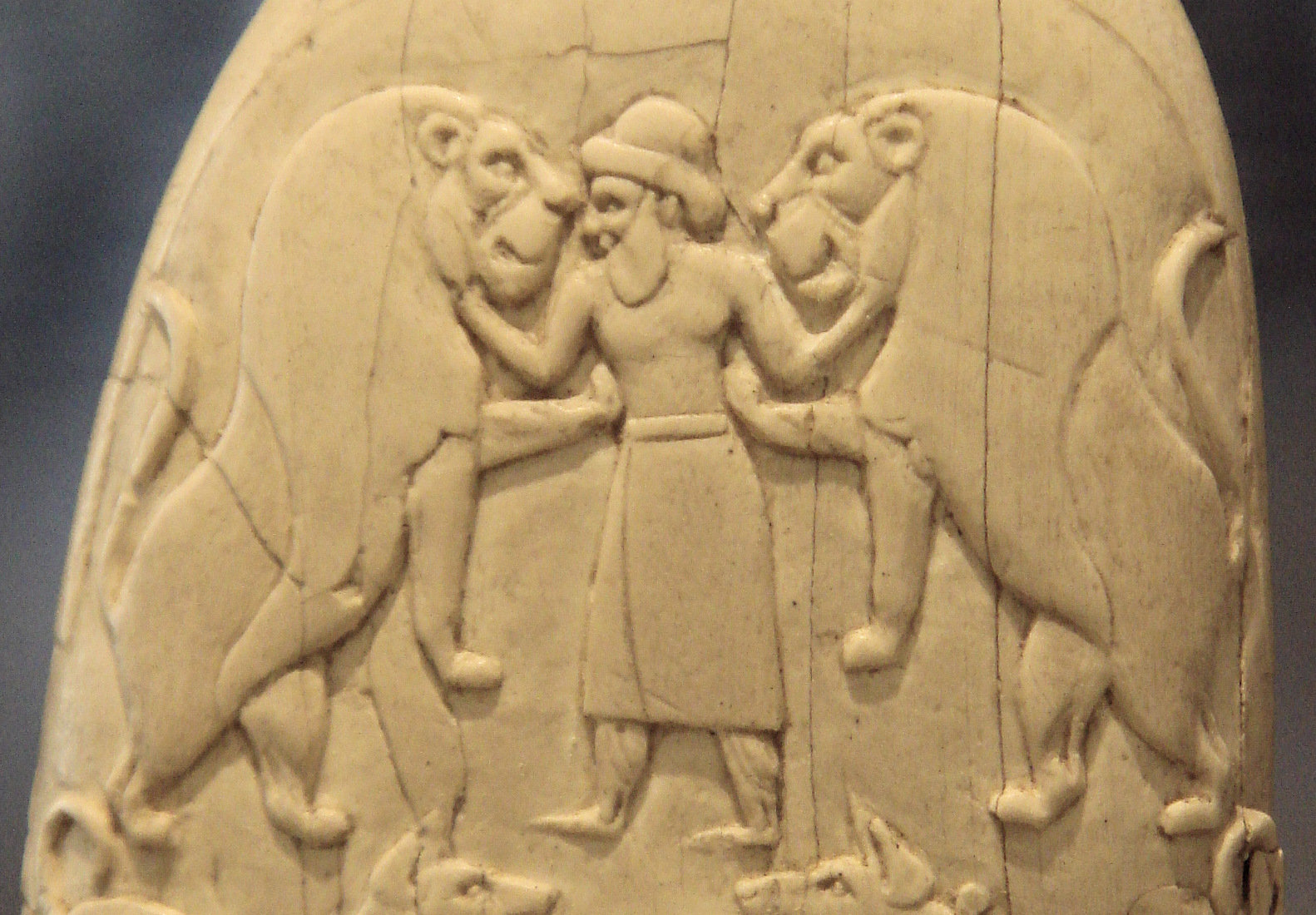
Mesopotamian king as Master of Animals on the top of the handle. This work of art both shows the influence of Mesopotamia on Egypt at an early date, in an example of ancient Egypt–Mesopotamia relations, and the state of Mesopotamian royal iconography during the Uruk period.

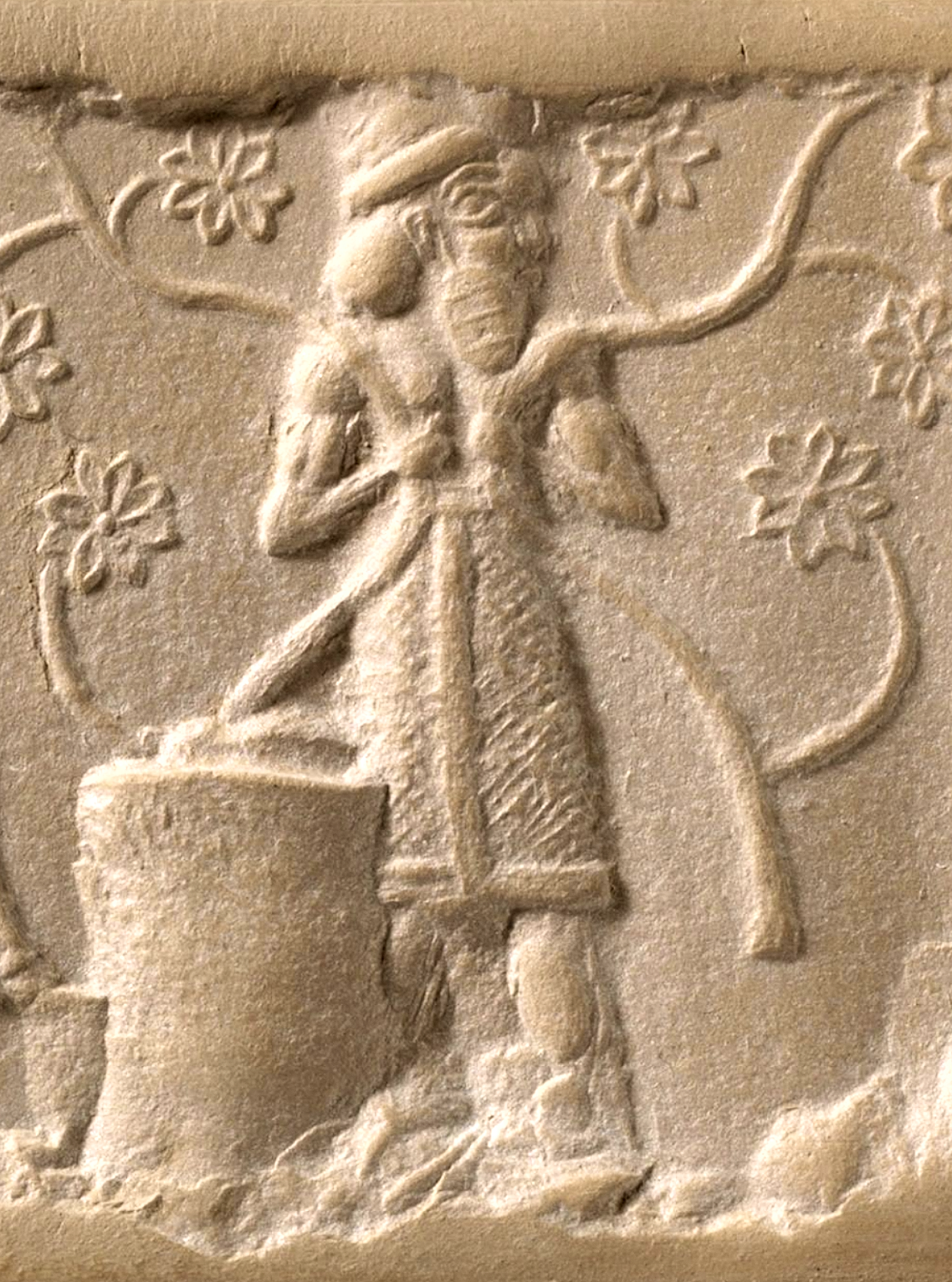
Similar portrait of an Uruk King-Priest with a brimmed round hat and large beard, bare-chested with a straight skirt. Uruk, 3300-3000 BC.

There was generally a high-level of trade between Ancient Egypt and the Near East throughout the Pre-dynastic period of Egypt, during the Naqada II (3600–3350 BCE) and Naqada III (3350–2950 BCE) phases. These were contemporary with the Late Uruk (3600–3100 BCE) and Jemdet Nasr (3100–2900 BCE) periods in Mesopotamia. The main period of cultural influence, particularly consisting in the transfer of Mesopotamian imagery, symbols and technology to Egypt, is considered to have lasted about 250 years, during the Naqada II to Dynasty I periods.

=== Designs and objects ===
Distinctly foreign objects and art forms entered Egypt during this period, indicating contacts with several parts of Western Asia. The designs that were emulated by Egyptian artists are numerous: the Uruk "Priest-King" with his tunic and brimmed hat in the posture of the Master of animals, the serpopards, winged griffins, snakes around rosettes, boats with high prows, all characteristic of long established Mesopotamian art of the Late Uruk (Uruk IV, c. 3350–3200 BCE) period. The same "Priest-King" is visible in several older Mesopotamian works of art of the end of the Uruk period, such as the Blau Monuments, cylinder seals and statues. Objects such as the Gebel el-Arak knife handle, which has patently Mesopotamian relief carvings on it, have been found in Egypt, and the silver which appears in this period can only have been obtained from Asia Minor.

==== Mesopotamian-style pottery in Egypt (3500 BCE) ====
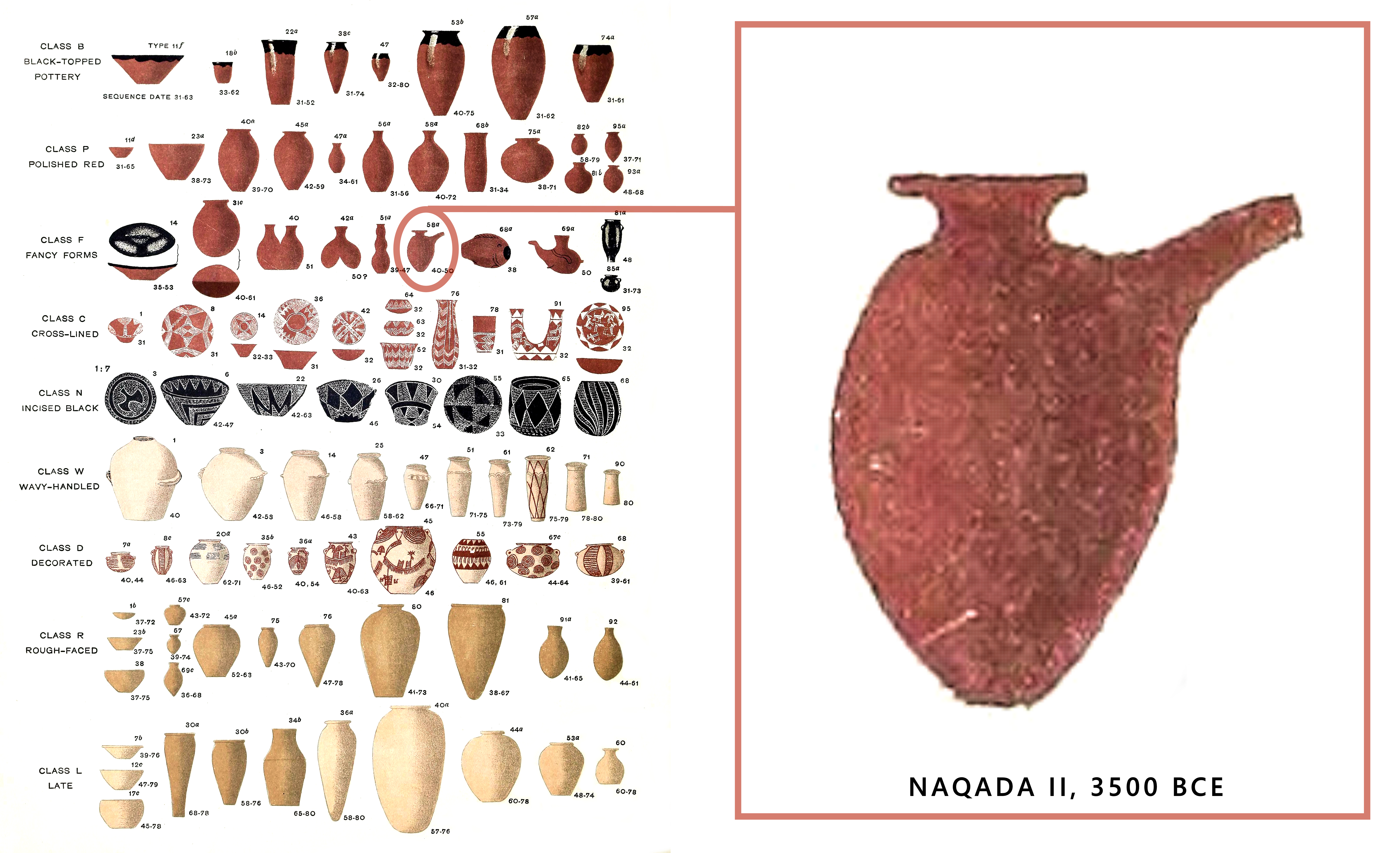
Evolution of Egyptian prehistoric pottery styles, from Naqada I to Naqada II and Naqada III, with Mesopotamian-style Naqada II straight-spouted jars circa 3500 BCE.

Red-slipped spouted pottery items dating to around 3500 BCE (Naqada II C/D), which were probably used for pouring water, beer or wine, suggest that Egypt was in contact with and being influenced by Mesopotamia around that time. This type of pottery was manufactured in Egypt, with Egyptian clay, but its shape, particularly the spout, is certainly Mesopotamian in origin. Such vessels were new and rare in pre-Dynastic Egypt, but had been commonly manufactured in the Mesopotamian cities of Nippur and Uruk for centuries. This indicated that Egyptians were familiar with Mesopotamian types of pottery. The discovery of these vessels initially encouraged the development of the dynastic race theory, according to which Mesopotamians would have established the first Pharaonic line, but is now considered by many scholars to be simply indicative of cultural influence and borrowings circa 3500 BCE, although there is an established gene flow from Mesopotamia and West Asia into Egypt .

Spouted jars of Mesopotamian design start to appear in Egypt in the Naqada II period. Various Uruk pottery vases and containers have been found in Egypt in Naqada contexts, confirming that Mesopotamian finished goods were imported into Egypt, although the past contents of the jars have not been determined yet. Scientific analysis of ancient wine jars in Abydos has shown there was some high-volume wine trade with the Levant and Mesopotamia during this period.

==== Adoption of Mesopotamian-style maceheads ====
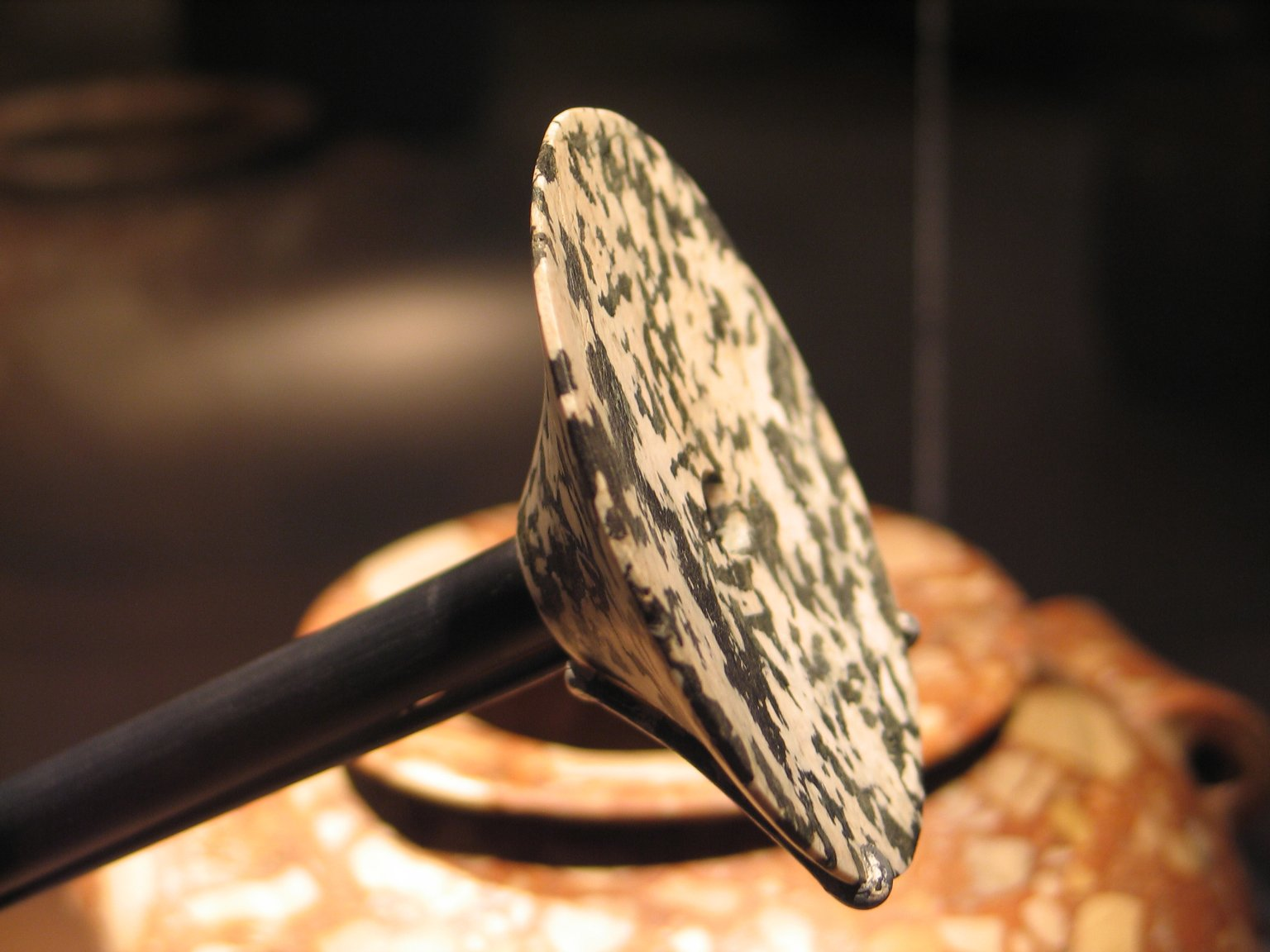
Egyptian disk-shaped macehead 4000–3400 BCE

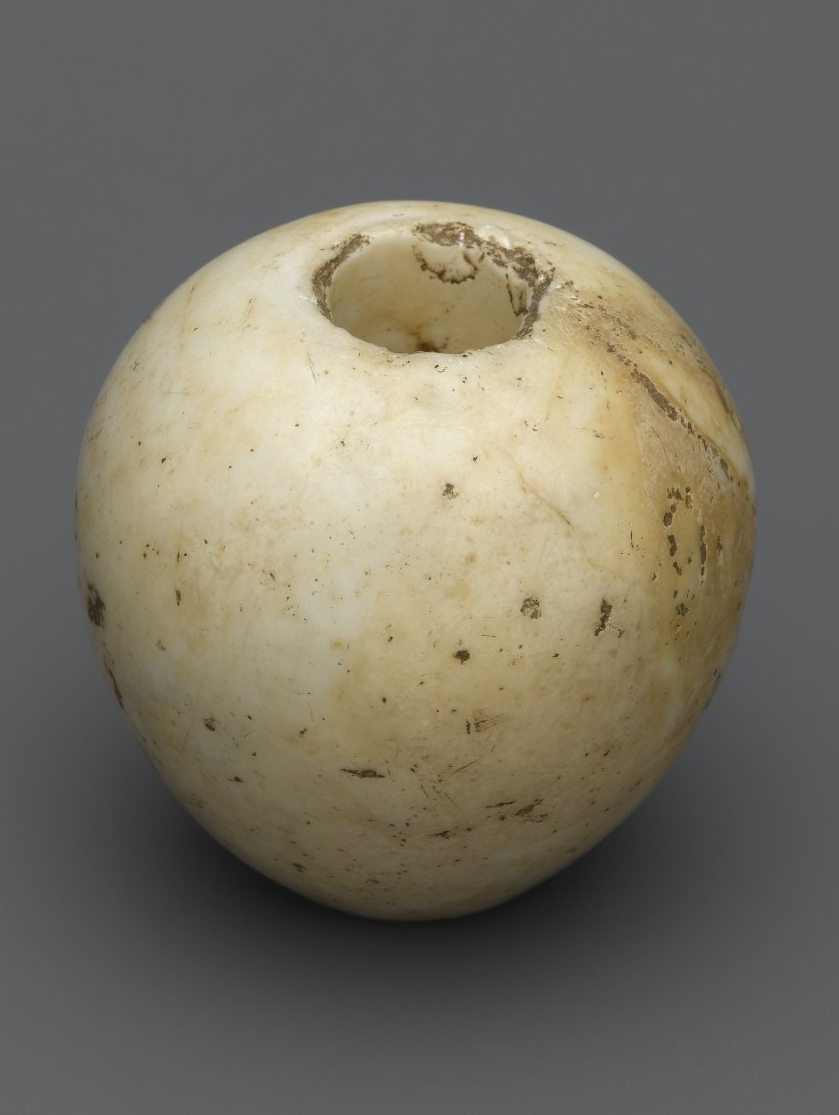
Egyptian macehead, 3500–3300 BCE

Egyptians used traditional disk-shaped maceheads during the early phase of Naqada culture, circa 4000–3400 BCE. At the end of the period, the disk-shaped macehead was replaced by the militarily superior Mesopotamian-style pear-shaped macehead as seen on the Narmer Palette. The Mesopotamian macehead was much heavier with a wider impact surface, and was capable of giving much more damaging blows than the original Egyptian disk-shaped macehead.

==== Cylinder seals ====
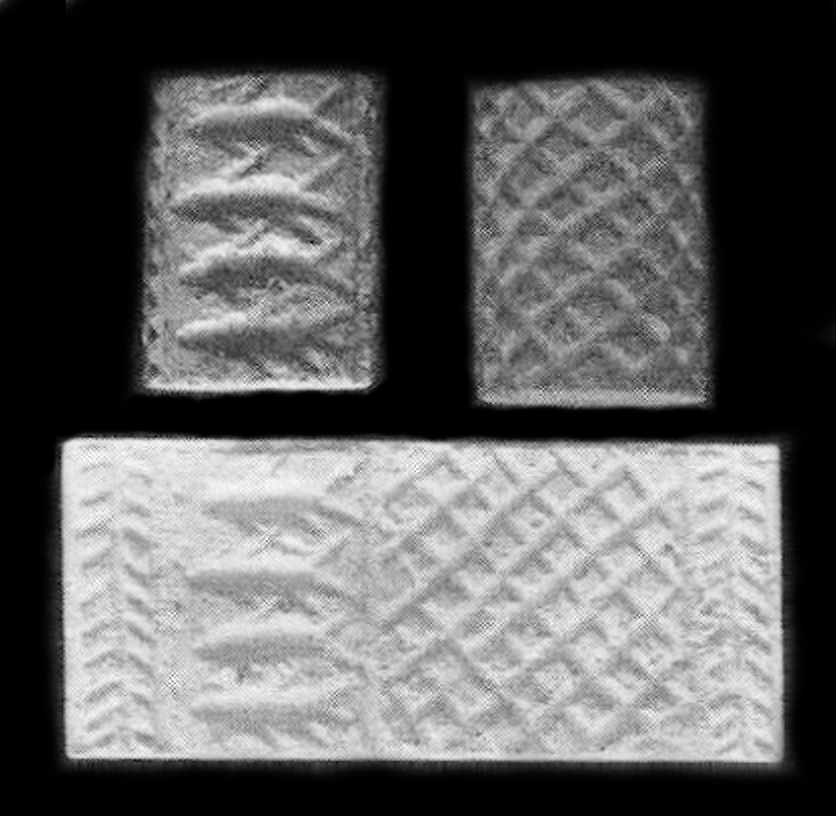
Jemdet Nasr-style cylinder seal, Naqada tomb, Naqada II period.

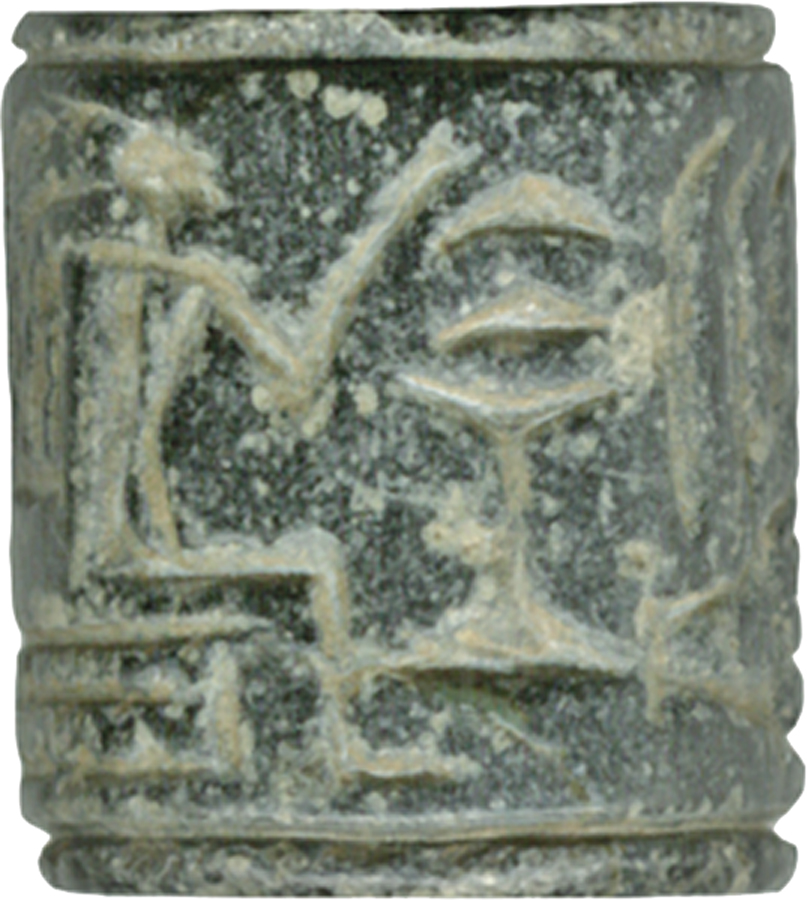
Archaic Egyptian cylinder Seal, 3100–2900 BCE

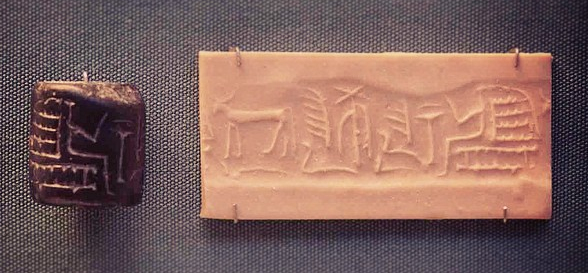
Egyptian cylinder seal First or Second Dynasty, 3100–2686 BCE

It is generally thought that cylinder seals were introduced from Mesopotamia to Egypt during the Naqada II period. Cylinder seals, some coming from Mesopotamia and also Elam in Ancient Iran, and some made locally in Egypt copying earlier Mesopotamian and Elamite designs in a stylized manner, have been discovered in the tombs of Upper Egypt dating to Naqada II and III, particularly in Hierakonpolis. Mesopotamian cylinder seals have been found in the Gerzean context of Naqada II, in Naqada and Hiw, attesting to the expansion of the Mesopotamian Jemdet Nasr culture as far as Egypt at the end of the 4th millennium BCE.

In Egypt, cylinder seals suddenly appear without any local antecedents from around Naqada II c-d (3500–3300 BCE). The designs are similar to and clearly inspired by those of Mesopotamia, where they were invented during the early 4th millennium BCE, during the Uruk period, as an evolutionary step from various accounting systems and seals going back as early as the early 7th millennium BCE in Mesopotamia. The earliest Egyptian cylinder seals are clearly similar to earlier and contemporary Uruk seals down to Naqada II-d (circa 3300 BCE), and may even have been manufactured by Mesopotamian craftsmen and subsequently sold to the Egyptians, but they start to diverge from circa 3300 BCE to become more Egyptian in character.

Cylinder seals were made in Egypt as late as the Second Intermediate Period, but they were essentially replaced by scarabs from the time of the Middle Kingdom.

==== Other objects and designs ====
Lapis lazuli was imported in great quantity by Egypt, and already used in many tombs of the Naqada II period. Lapis lazuli probably originated in what is today northern Afghanistan, as no other sources are known, and had to be transported across the Iranian plateau to Mesopotamia as part of the established Mesopotamian trade network with South and Central Asia, and from there sold on to Egypt by the Mesopotamians.

In addition, Egyptian objects were created which clearly mimic Mesopotamian forms, although not slavishly. Cylinder seals appear in Egypt, as well as recessed paneling architecture, the Egyptian reliefs on cosmetic palettes are clearly made in the same style as the earlier and contemporary Mesopotamian Uruk culture, and the ceremonial mace heads which turn up from the late Gerzean and early Semainean are crafted in the Mesopotamian "pear-shaped" style, instead of the Egyptian native style. The first man/animal composite creatures in Egypt were directly copied from earlier Mesopotamian designs. It is also considered as certain that the Egyptians adopted from Mesopotamia the practice of marking the sealing of jars with engraved cylinder seals for informational purposes.

=== Temples and pyramids ===
Recessed niches and false doors

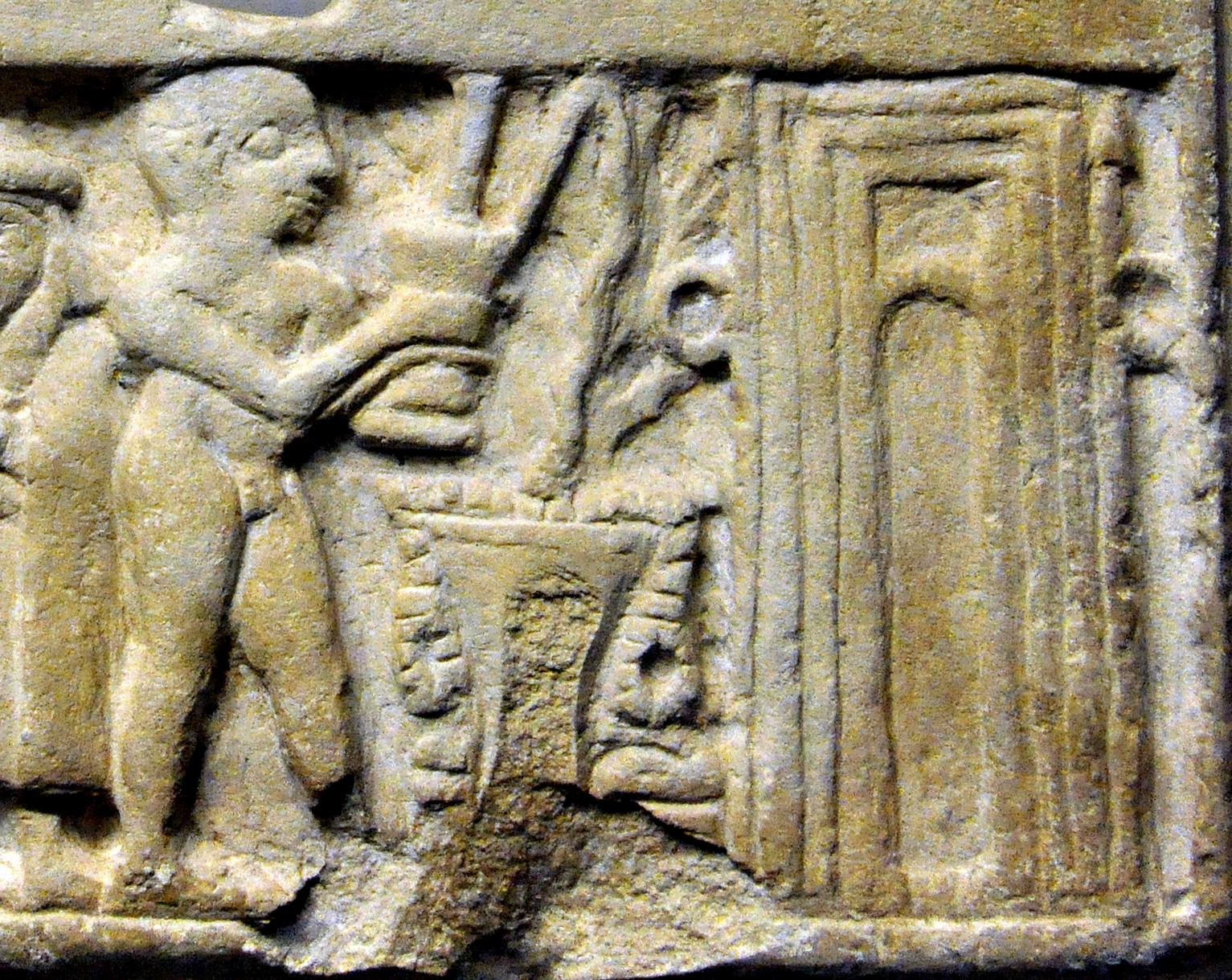
Naked devotee offering libations to a temple of Inanna, Ur, c. 2500 BCE.

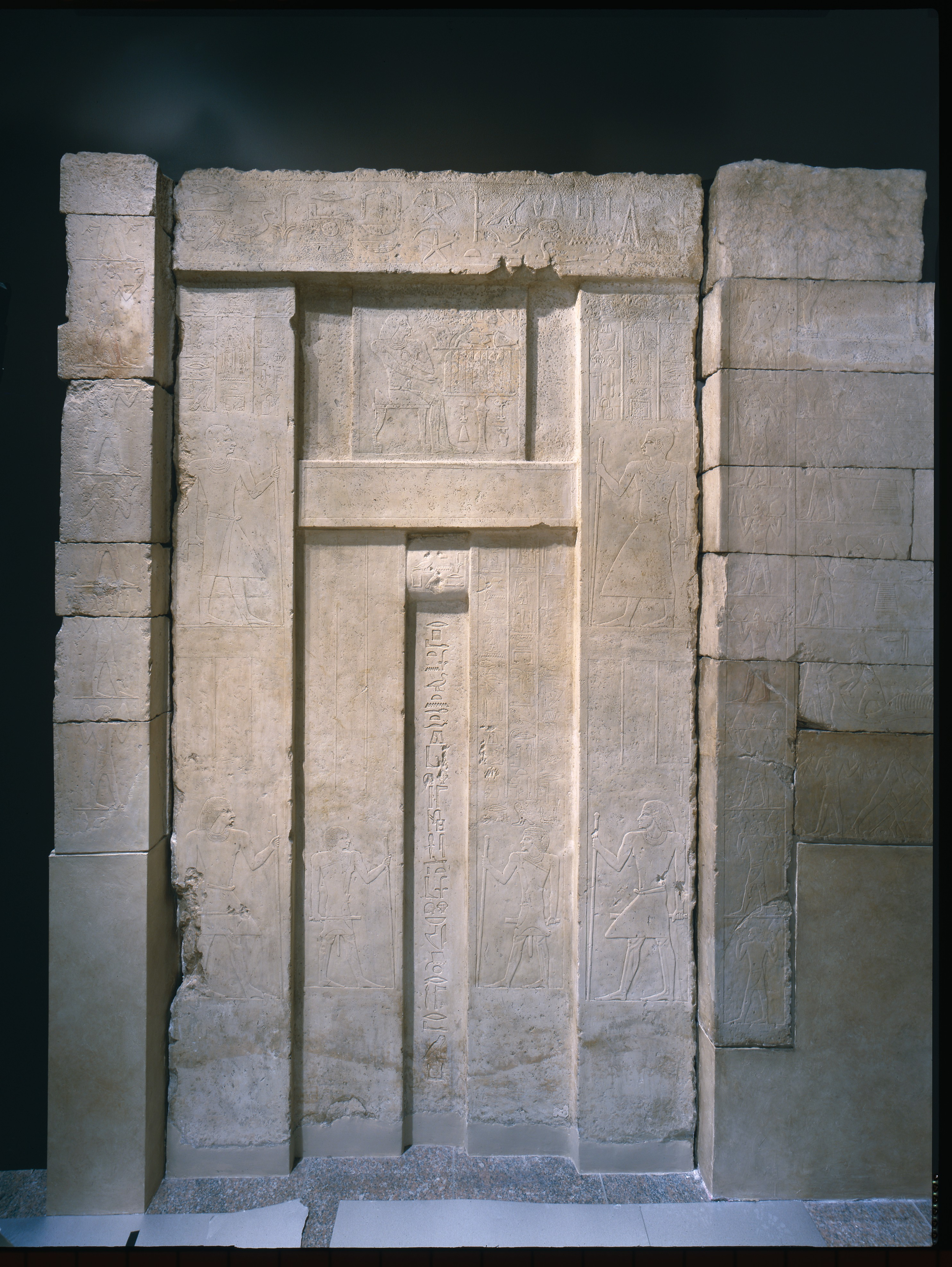
Tomb chapel false door, circa 2450 BCE, Egypt.

Egyptian architecture also was influenced, as it adopted various elements of earlier Mesopotamian temple and civic architecture.

Recessed niches in particular, which are characteristic of Mesopotamian temple architecture, were adopted for the design of false doors in the tombs of the First Dynasty and Second Dynasty, from the time of the Naqada III period (circa 3000 BCE). It is unknown if the transfer of this design was the result of Mesopotamian builders and architects in Egypt, or if temple designs on imported Mesopotamian seals may have been a sufficient source of inspiration for Egyptian architects to manage themselves.

The design of the ziggurat, which appeared in Mesopotamia in the late 5th millennium BCE, was clearly a precursor to and an influence on the Egyptian pyramids, especially the stepped designs of the oldest pyramids (step pyramid), the earliest of which (Pyramid of Zoser at Saqqara) dates to circa 2600 BCE, well over two thousand years younger than Mesopotamian ziggurats/step pyramids. This again strongly suggests early cultural and technological influence on Egypt by Mesopotamia.

Ziggurats and Egyptian pyramids

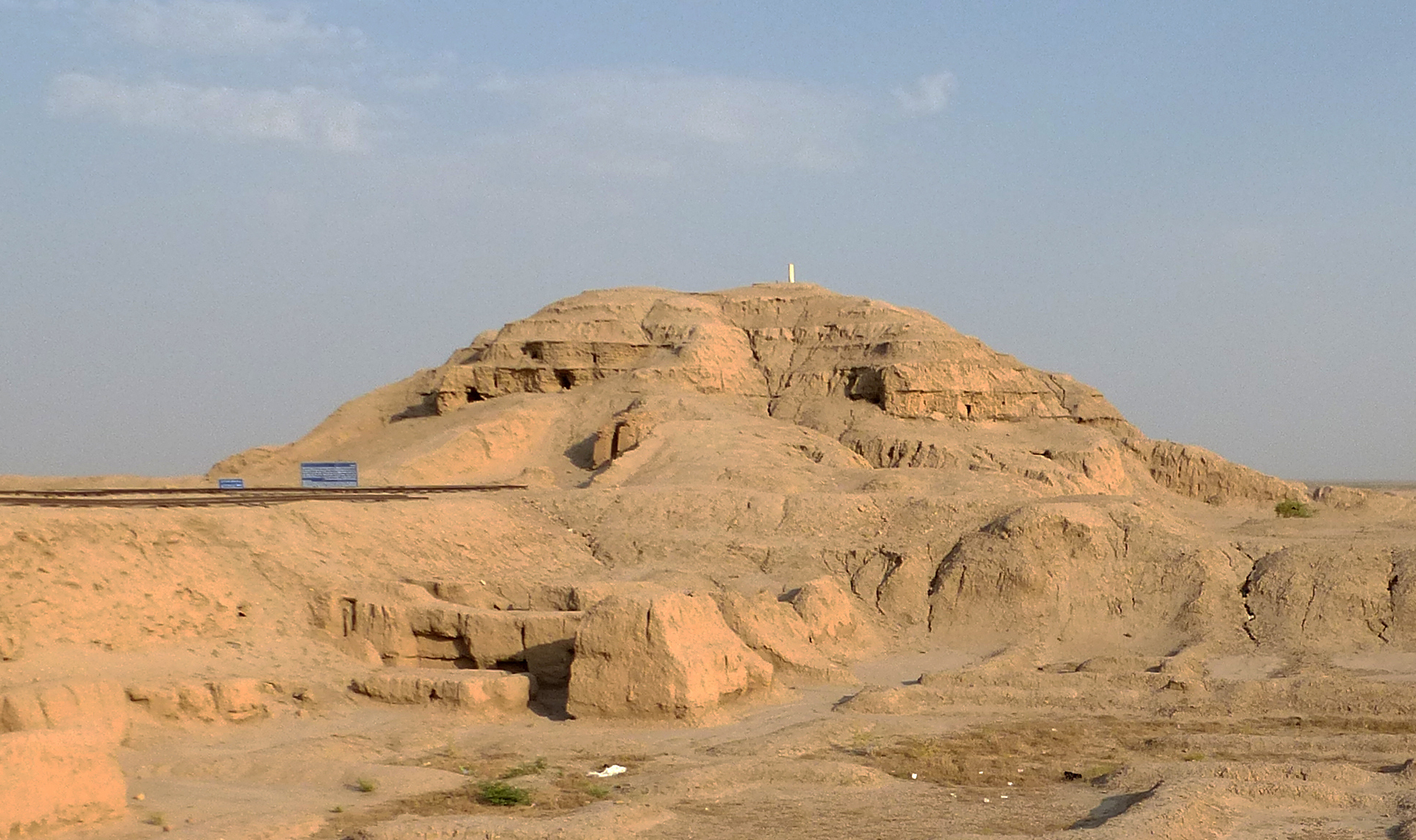
The original Mesopotamian Anu ziggurat dates to around 4000 BCE

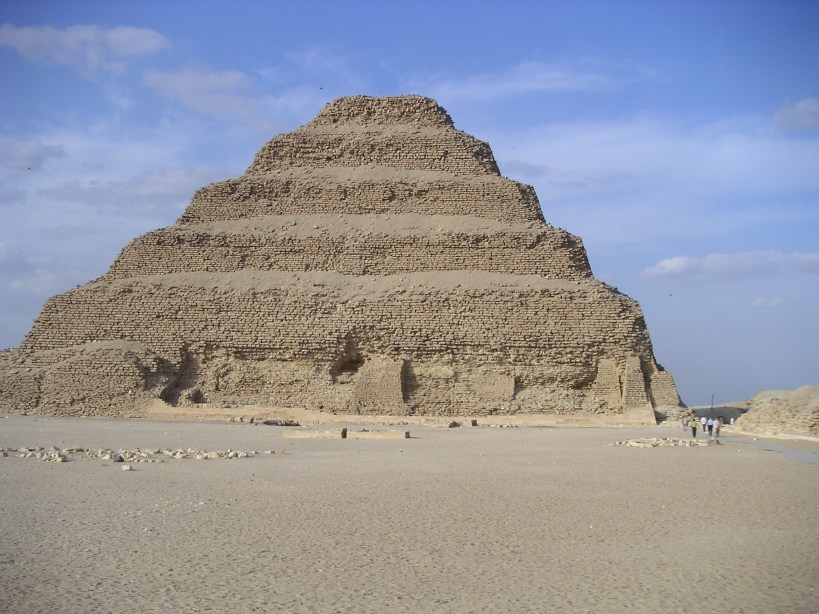
The Pyramid of Djoser, the first Egyptian pyramid, dates circa 2670–2650 BCE

The original pyramidal structure, the Mesopotamian "Anu Ziggurat" dates to around 4000 BCE, and the White Temple was built on top of it circa 3500 BCE. The design of the ziggurat was probably a precursor to that of the Egyptian pyramids, the earliest of which dates to circa 2600 BCE.

=== Transmission ===
Serpopard design in Mesopotamia and Egypt

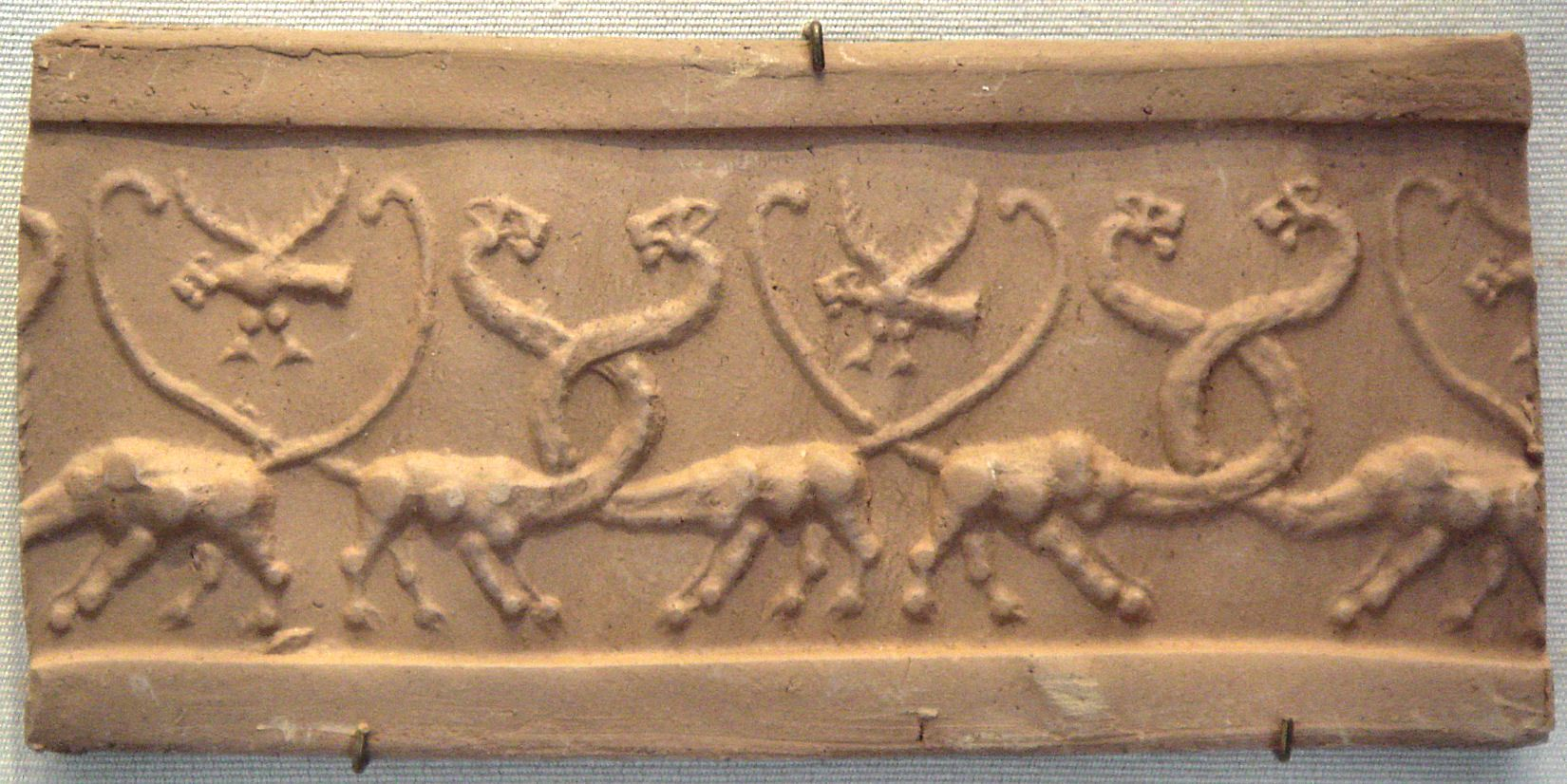
Uruk cylinder seal with serpopard design. The serpopard design of Egyptian palettes was adopted from Mesopotamian serpopard designs.

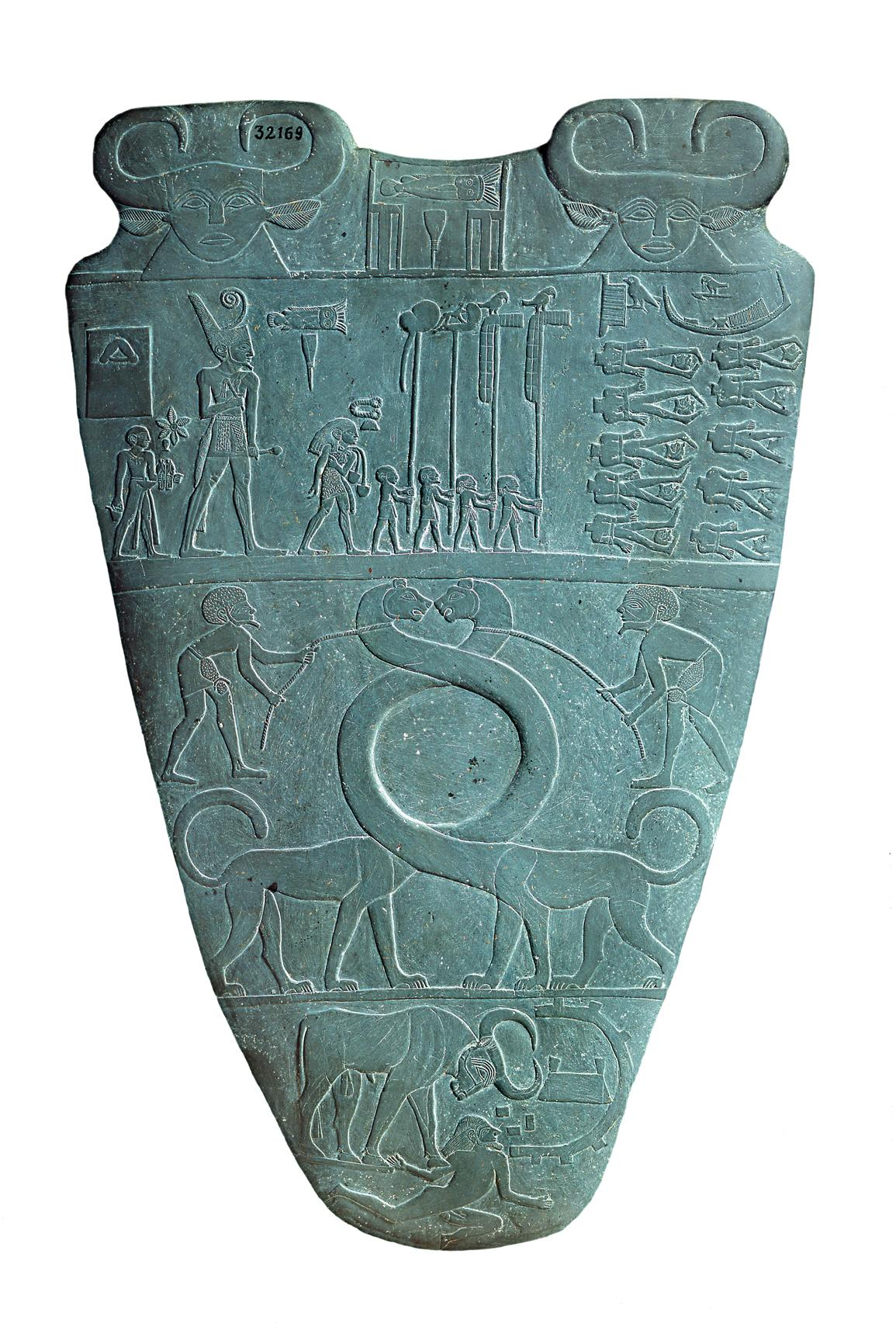
Egyptian Narmer Palette with serpopard design.

The route of this trade is difficult to determine, but direct Egyptian contact with Canaan in the Levant does not predate the early dynastic era, so it is usually assumed to have been by sea trade. During the time when the dynastic race theory was still popular, it was proposed that Mesopotamian sailors circumnavigated Arabia, but a Mediterranean route, probably by middlemen through the Canaanite port of Byblos, is also likely, as evidenced by the presence of Canaanite Byblian objects in Egypt. Glyptic art also seems to have played a key role, through the circulation of decorated cylinder seals across the Levant, a common hinterland of both empires, particularly Mesopotamia.

The intensity of the exchanges suggest however that the contacts between Egypt and Mesopotamia were often direct, rather than merely through middlemen or through trade. Uruk had known colonial outposts of as far as Habuba Kabira, in modern Syria, insuring their presence in the Levant. Numerous Uruk cylinder seals have also been uncovered there. There have been suggestions that Uruk may have had a colonial outpost and a form of colonial presence in northern Egypt. The site of Buto in particular was suggested, but it has been rejected as a possible candidate.

The fact that so many Gerzean sites are at the mouths of wadis which lead to the Red Sea may indicate some amount of trade via the Red Sea (though Byblian trade potentially could have crossed the Sinai and then be taken to the Red Sea). Also, it is considered unlikely that something as complicated as recessed panel architecture could have worked its way into Egypt by proxy, and a possibly significant contingent of Mesopotamian migrants or settlers is often suspected.

These early contacts probably acted as a sort of catalyst for the development of Egyptian culture, particularly in respect to the inception of writing, the codification of royal and vernacular imagery and architectural innovations.

These imports from Mesopotamia appear to have been quite intensive during the late Gerzean period (late Naqada II), and correspond to the Protoliterate b and c cultures of Mesopotamia. "Naqada" literally means "Golden City", and the city was at the center of the developing trade of gold from the eastern desert of Egypt. This may have stimulated the direct involvement of Mesopotamian traders, who, accompanied by artists and various skilled personnel, may have introduced Mesopotamian styles and practices. The exploitation of gold may also have stimulated the development of the first organized proto-state structures in Egypt.

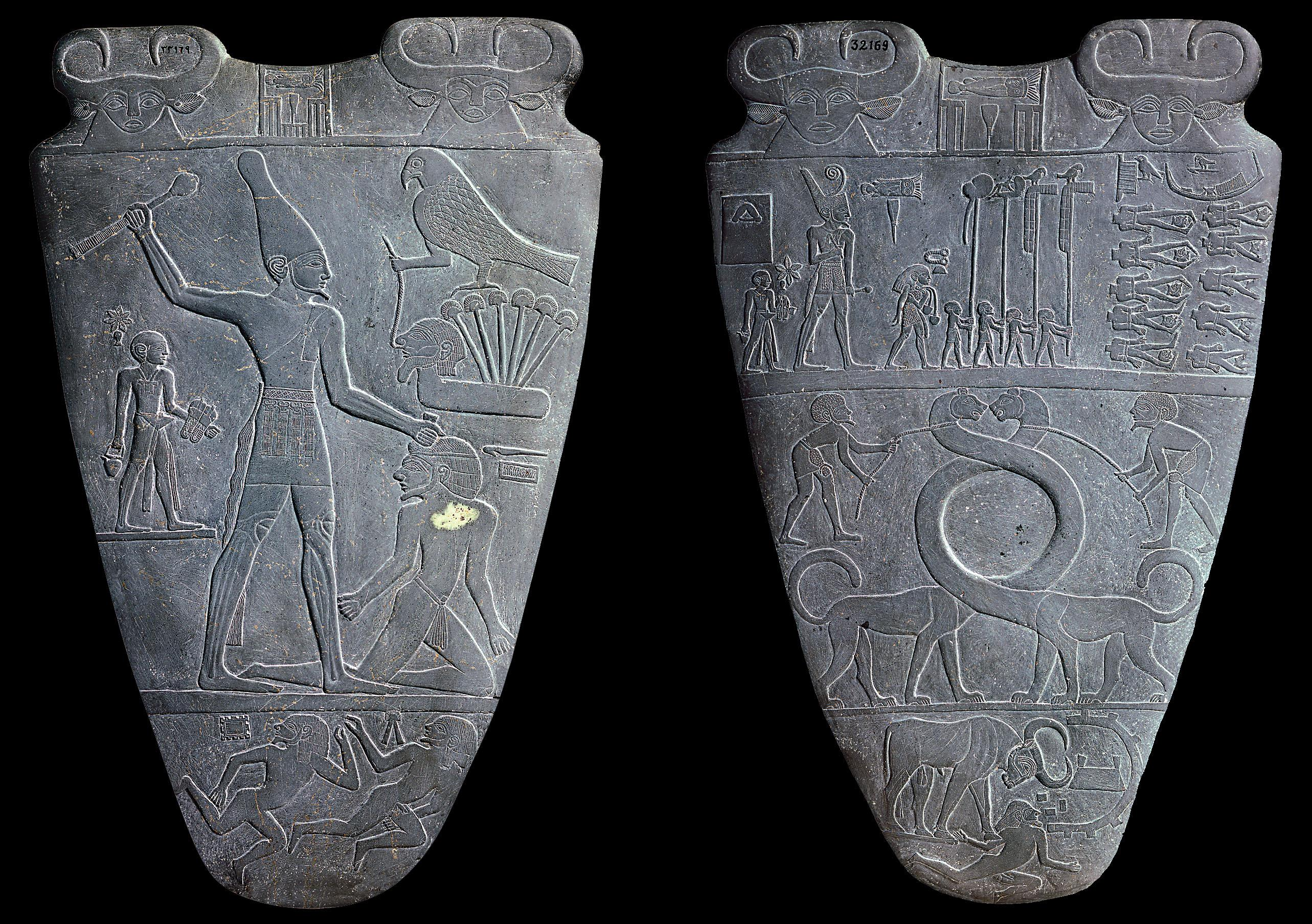
Egyptian palettes, such as the Narmer Palette (3200–3000 BCE), borrow elements of Mesopotamian iconography, in particular the serpopard design of Uruk.

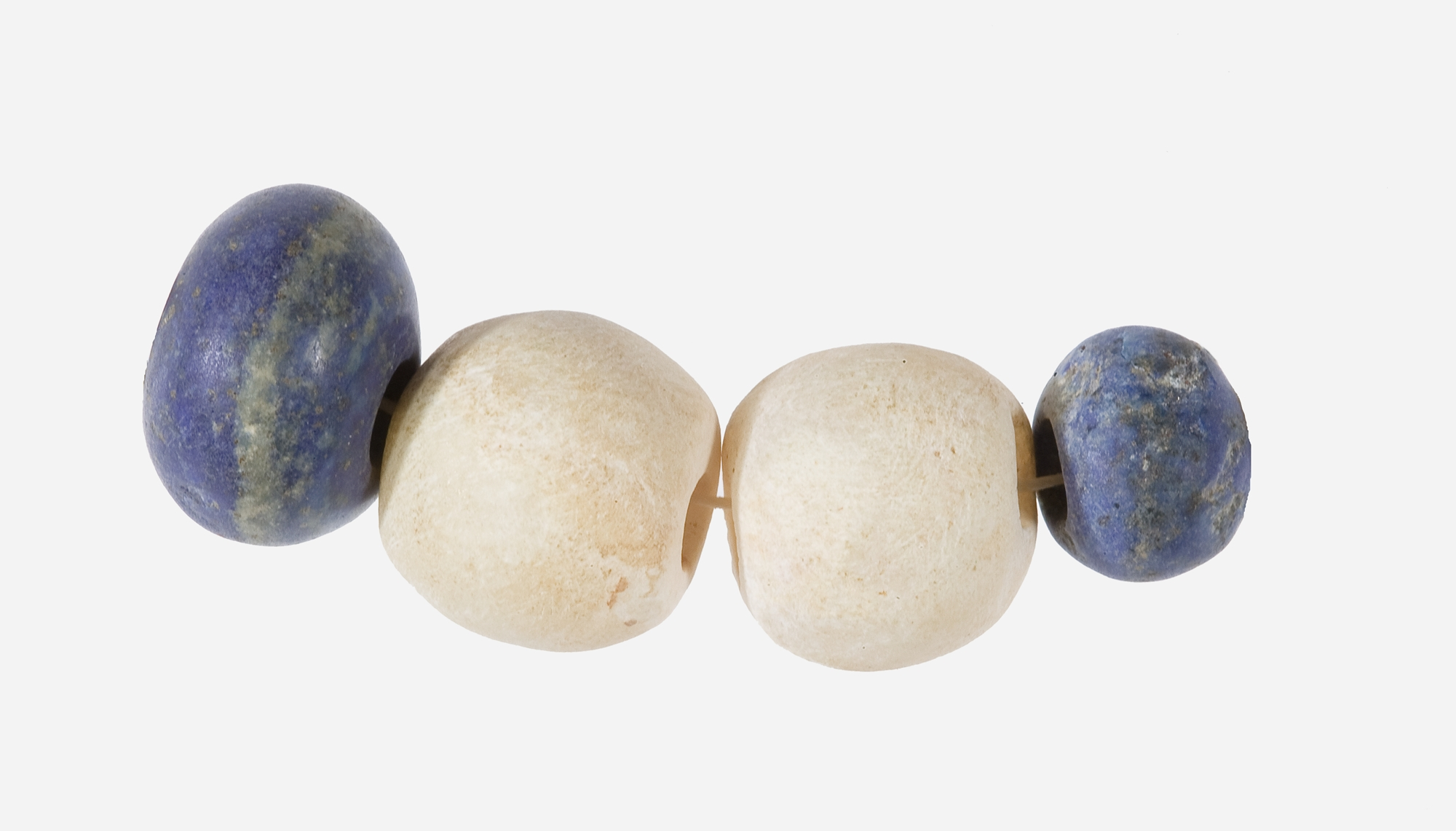
Beads of lapis lazuli and travertine, circa 3650–3100 BCE. Naqada II–Naqada III.

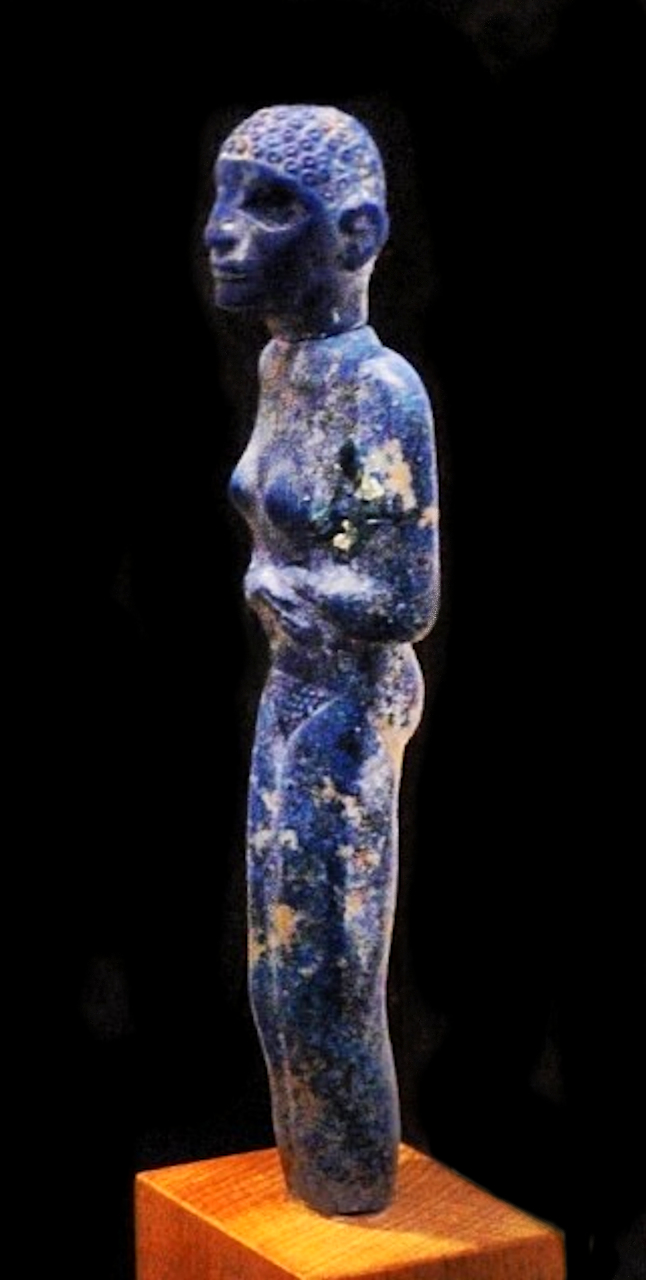
Egyptian statuette, 3300–3000 BCE. The lapis lazuli material is thought to have been imported through Mesopotamia from Afghanistan. Ashmolean.

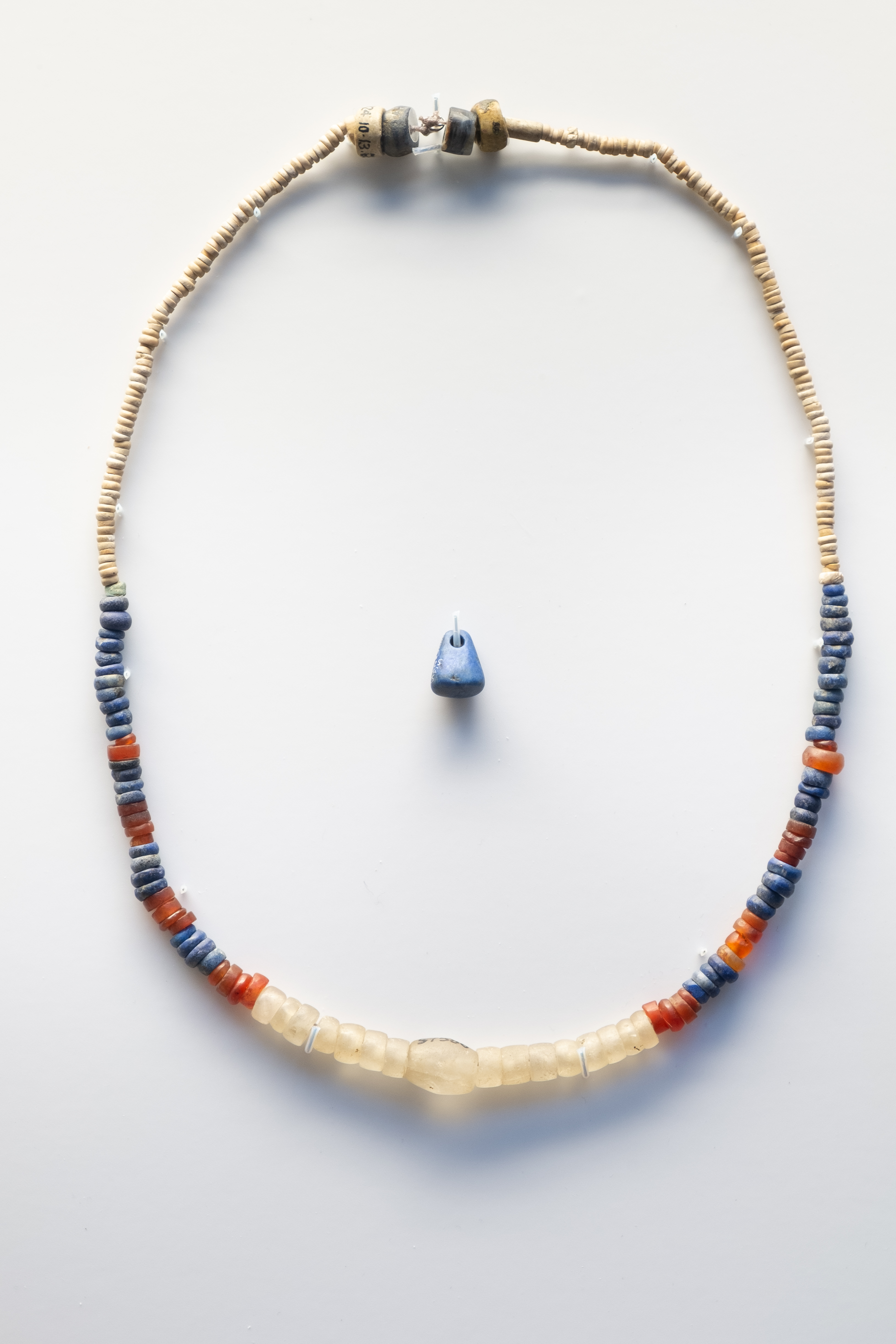
Egyptian necklace and pendant, using lapis lazuli imported from Afghanistan, possibly by Mesopotamian traders, Naqada II circa 3500 BCE, British Museum EA57765 EA57586.

==== Importance of local Egyptian developments ====
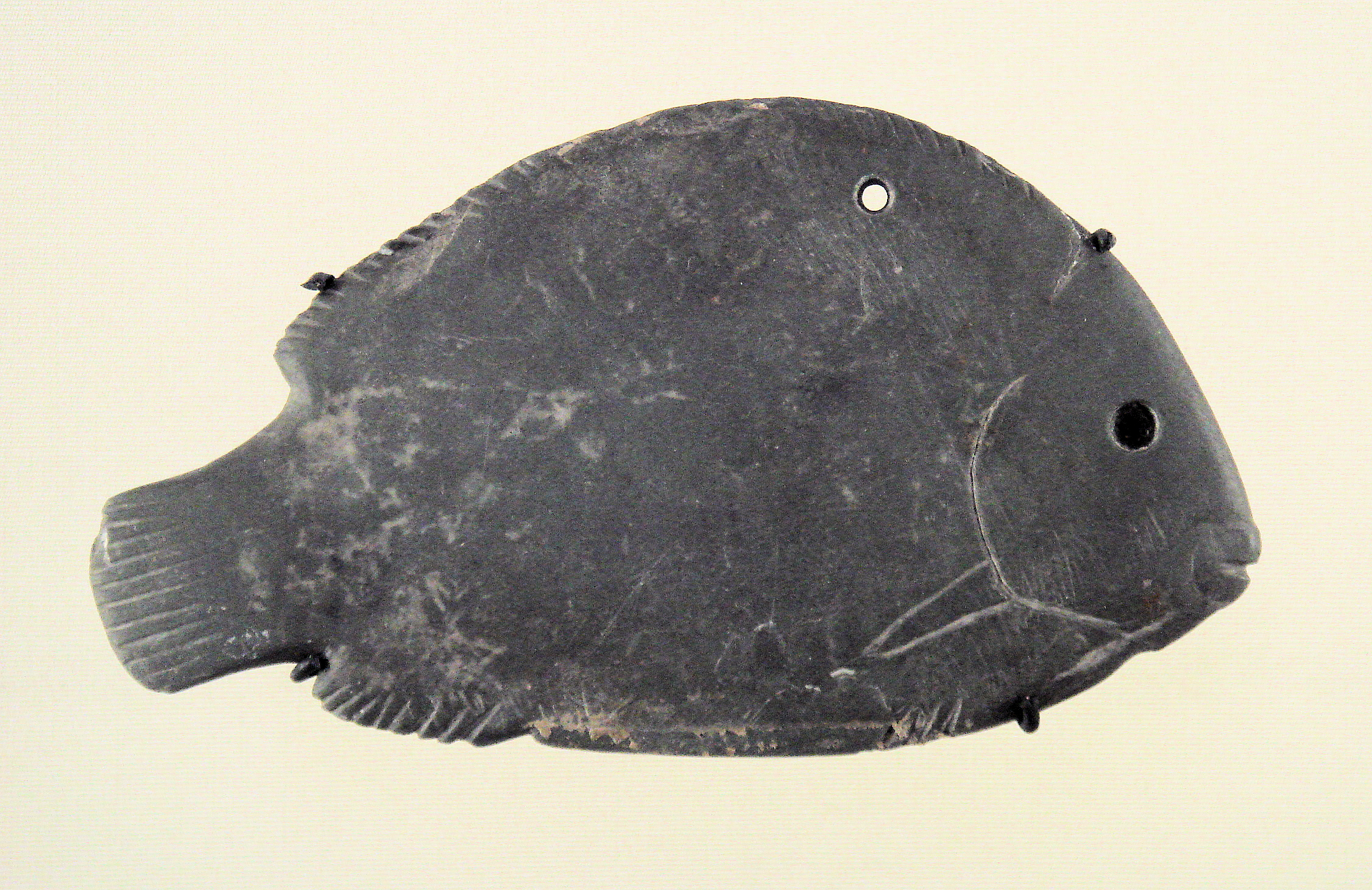
A rare Naqada III Egyptian Cosmetic palette found beyond Egypt, in Ashkelon or Gaza, end of 4th millennium, Louvre Museum AO 5359.

While there is clear evidence the Naqada II culture borrowed abundantly from Mesopotamia, there is also a commonly held view that many of the achievements of the later First Dynasty were also the result of a long period of indigenous cultural and political development. Such developments are much older than the Naqada II period, the Naqada II period had a large degree of continuity with the Naqada I period, and the changes which did happen during the Naqada periods happened over significant amounts of time.

Although there are many examples of Mesopotamian influence in Egypt in the 4th millennium BCE, the reverse is not true, and there are no traces of Egyptian influence in Mesopotamia at any time, clearly indicating a one way flow of ideas. Only very few Egyptian Naqada period object have been found beyond Egypt, and generally in its vicinity, such as a rare Naqada III Egyptian cosmetic palette in the shape of a fish, of the end of 4th millennium BCE, found in Ashkelon or Gaza.

Early Egyptologists such as Flinders Petrie were proponents of the Dynastic race theory which hypothesised that the first Egyptian chieftains and rulers were themselves of Mesopotamian origin, but this view has been abandoned among modern scholars.

The current position of modern scholarship is that the Egyptian civilization was an indigenous Nile Valley development and that the archaeological evidence "strongly supports an African origin" of the ancient Egyptians.

== Development of writing (3500–3200 BCE) ==
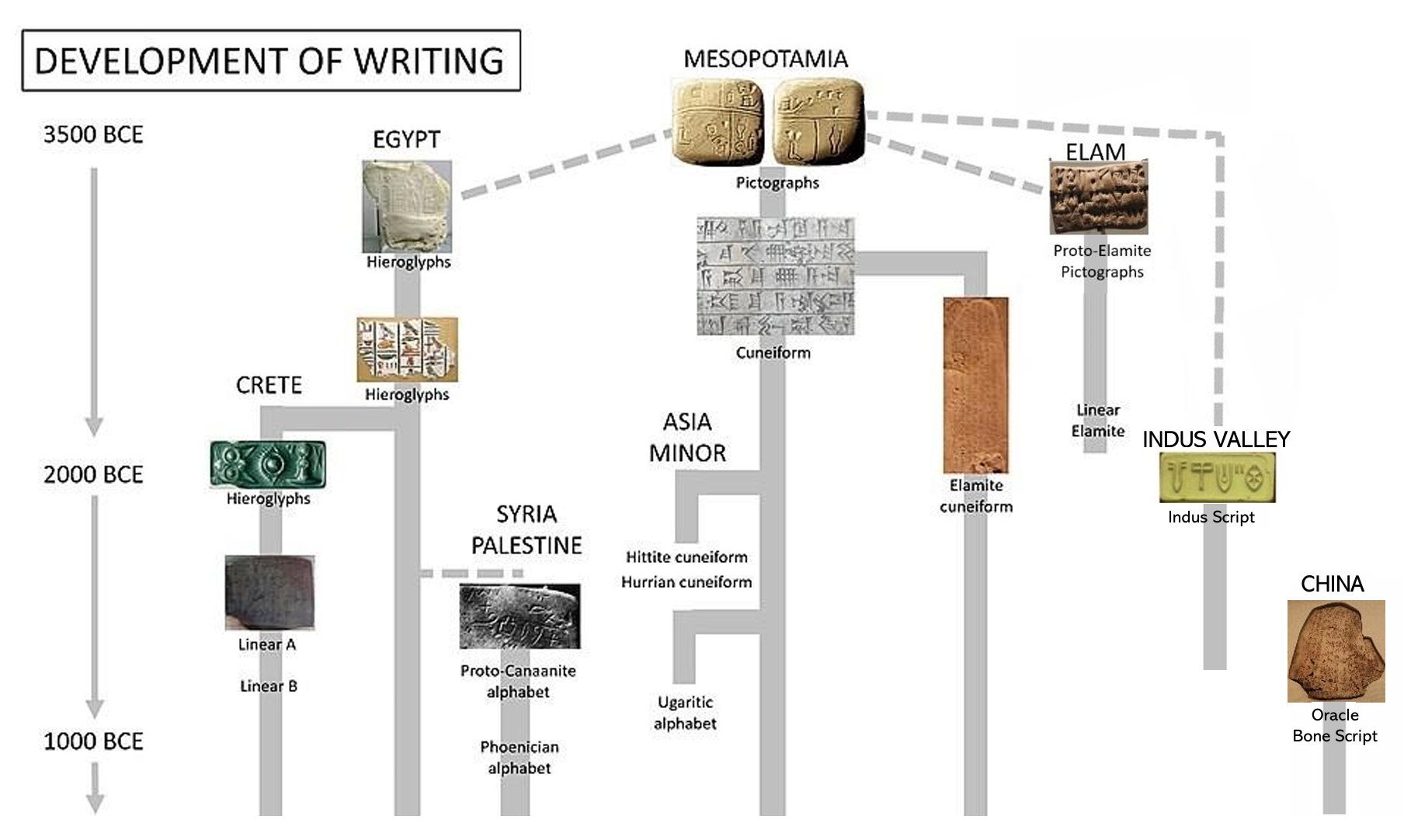
Standard reconstruction of the development of writing, with position of cuneiform. There is a possibility that the Egyptian script was invented independently from the Mesopotamian script.

It is generally thought that Egyptian hieroglyphs "came into existence a century or so after Sumerian script, and were probably invented under the influence of the latter", and that it is "probable that the general idea of expressing words of a language in writing was brought to Egypt from Sumerian Mesopotamia". The two writing systems are in fact quite similar in their initial stages, relying heavily on pictographic forms and then evolving a parallel system for the expression of phonetic sounds.

Standard reconstructions of the development of writing generally place the development of the Sumerian proto-cuneiform script before the development of Egyptian hieroglyphs, with the strong suggestion the former influenced the latter.

There is however a lack of direct evidence that Mesopotamian writing influenced Egyptian form, and "no definitive determination has been made as to the origin of hieroglyphics in ancient Egypt". Some scholars point out that "a very credible argument can also be made for the independent development of writing in Egypt..." Since the 1990s, the discovery of glyphs on clay tags at Abydos, dated to between 3400 and 3200 BCE, may challenge the classical notion according to which the Mesopotamian symbol system predates the Egyptian one, although perhaps tellingly, Egyptian writing does make a 'sudden' appearance at that time with no antecedents or precursors, while on the contrary Mesopotamia already had a long evolutionary history of sign usage in tokens dating back to circa 8000 BCE, followed by Proto-Cuneiform. Pittman proposes that the Abydos clay tags are almost identical to contemporary clay tags from Uruk, Mesopotamia.

Egyptian scholar Gamal Mokhtar argued that the inventory of hieroglyphic symbols derived from "fauna and flora used in the signs [which] are essentially African" and in "regards to writing, we have seen that a purely Nilotic, hence African origin not only is not excluded, but probably reflects the reality" although he acknowledged the geographical location of Egypt made it a receptacle for many influences. According to Frank Yurco, "Egyptian writing arose in Naqadan Upper Egypt and A-Group Nubia, and not in the Delta cultures, where the direct Western Asian contact was made, further vitiates the Mesopotamian-influence argument".

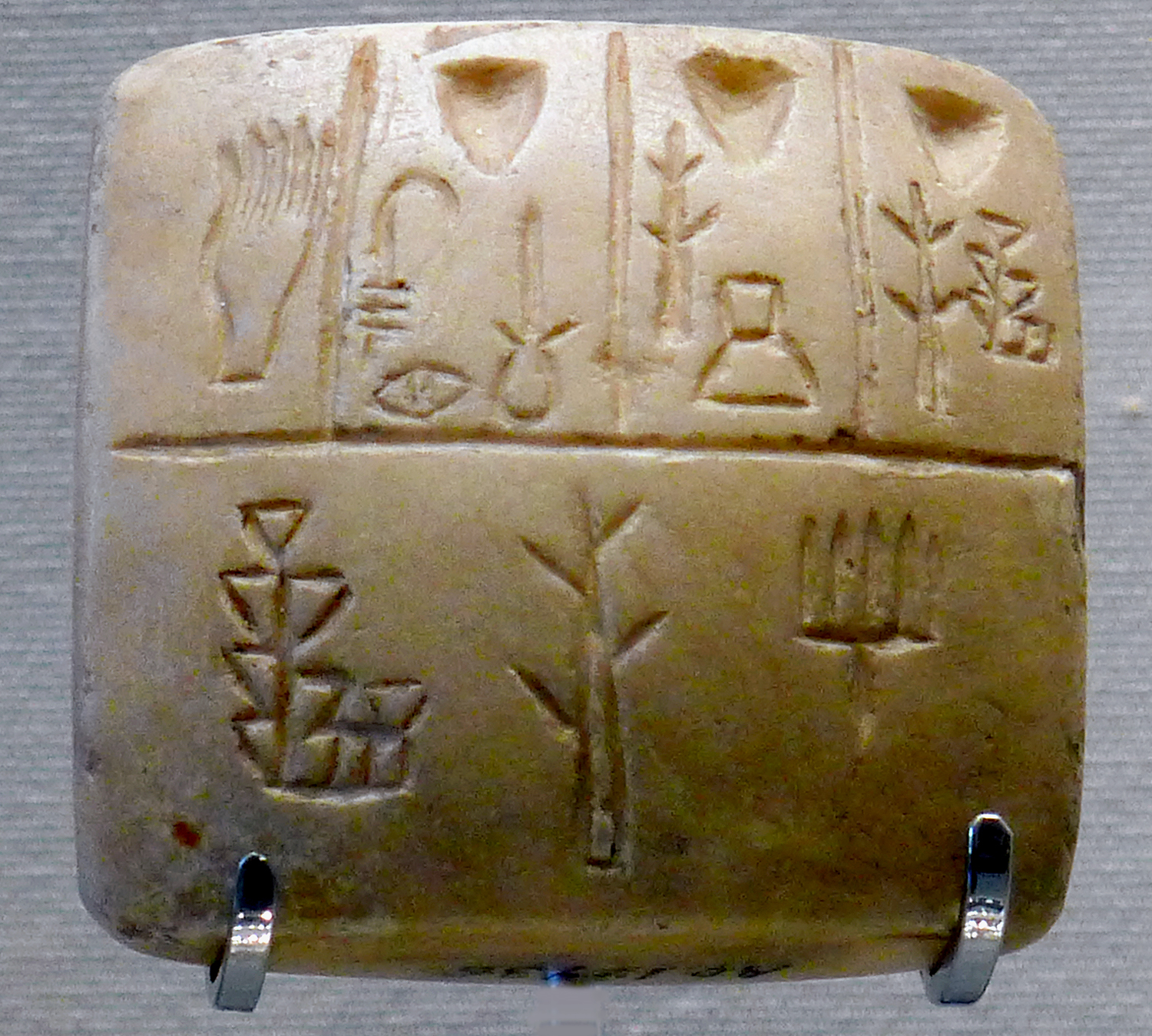
Tablet with Mesopotamian proto-cuneiform pictographic characters (end of 4th millennium BCE), Uruk III.

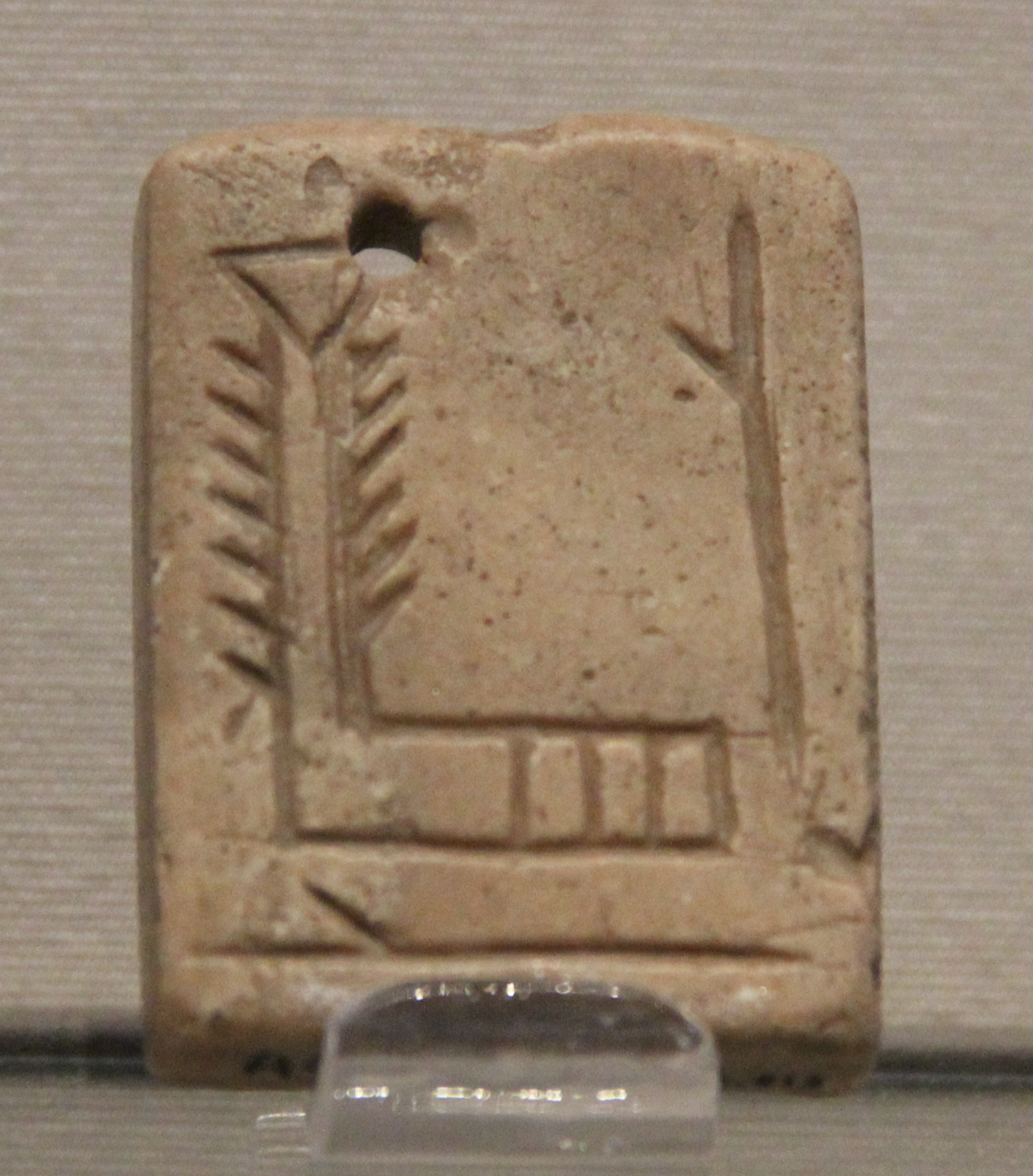
Mesopotamian pierced label, with symbol "EN" meaning "Master", the reverse of the plaque has the symbol for Goddess Inanna. Uruk circa 3000 BCE. Louvre Museum AO 7702

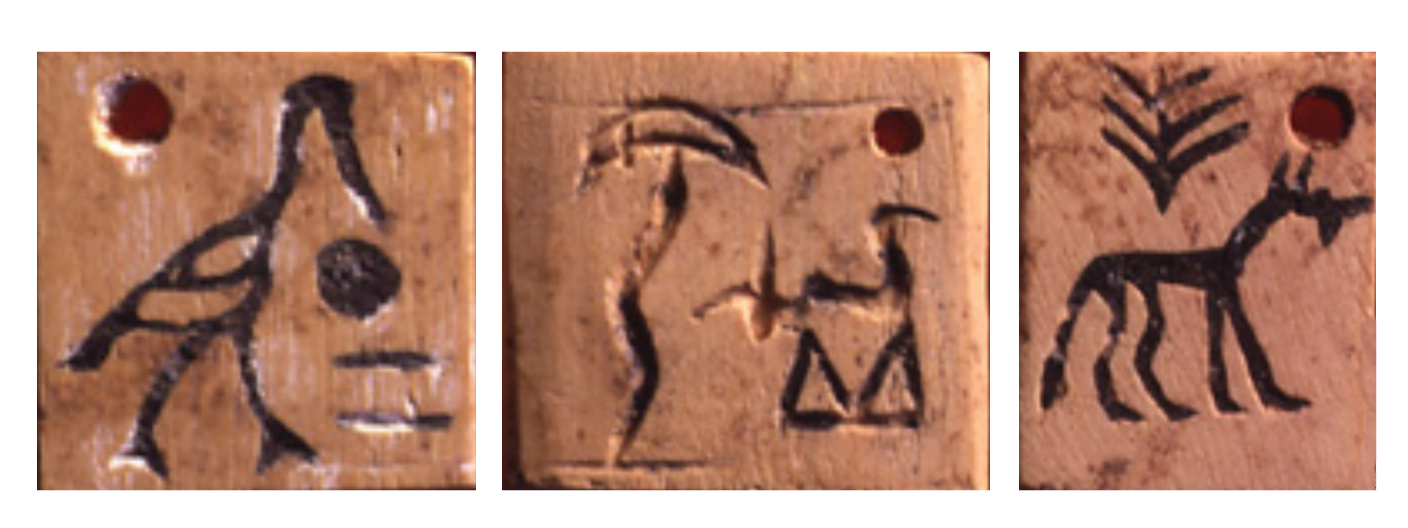
Designs on some of the labels or token from Abydos, Egypt, carbon-dated to circa 3400–3200 BCE. They are virtually identical with contemporary clay tags from Uruk, Mesopotamia.

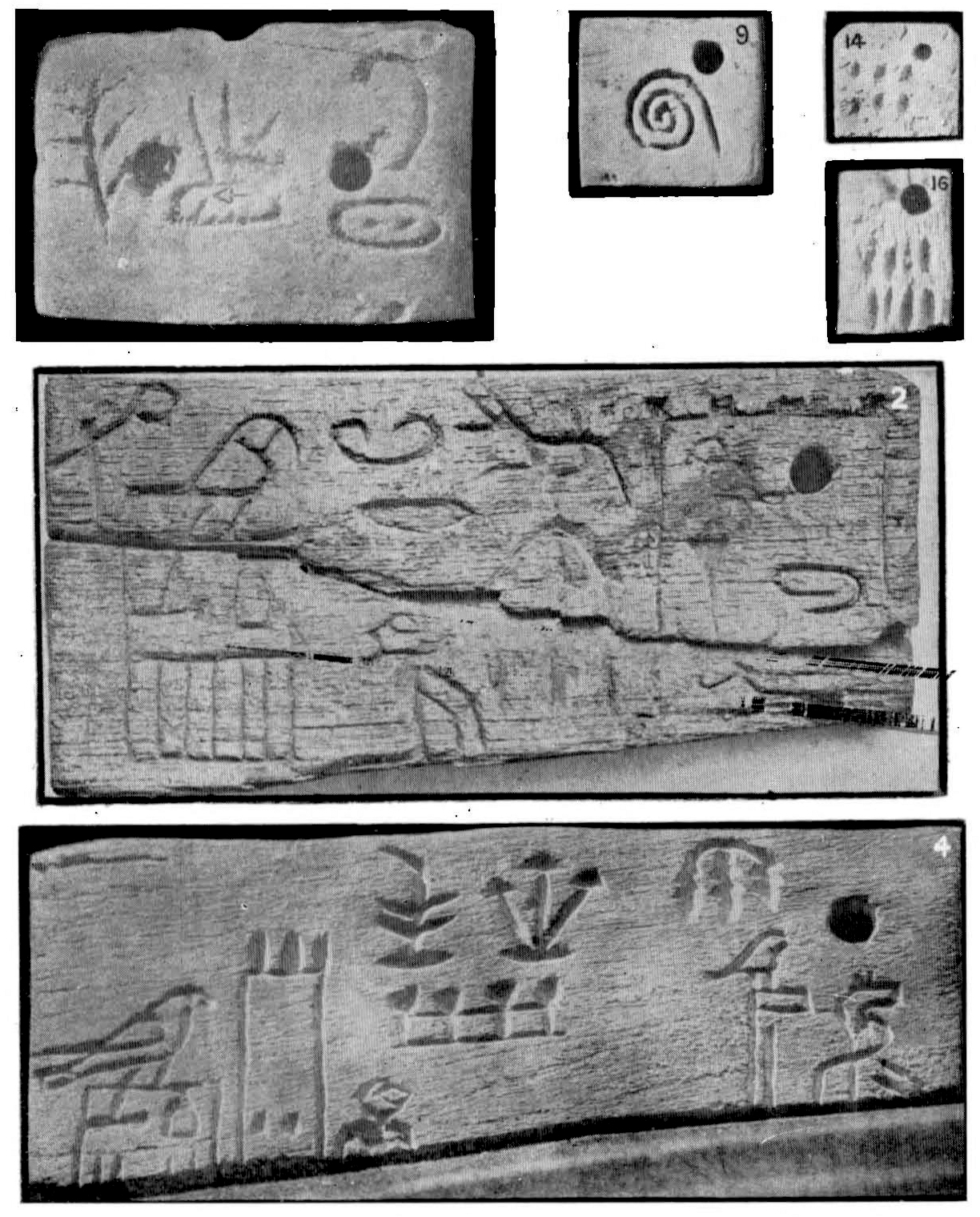
Labels with some of the earliest Egyptian hieroglyphs from the tomb of Egyptian king Hor-Aha (3200–3000 BCE)

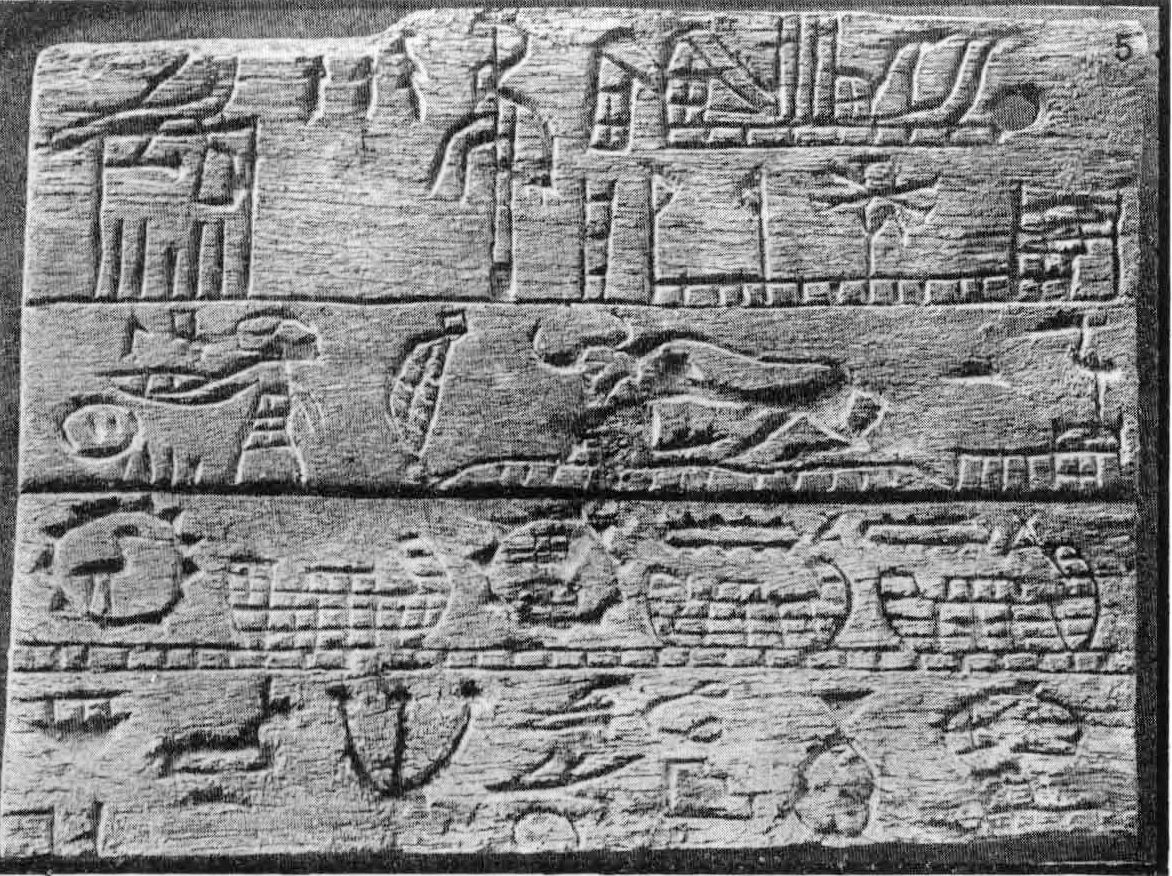
Ivory plaque of Hor-Aha (3200–3000 BCE)

== Egyptian influence on Mesopotamian art ==
Hegemonistic kingship

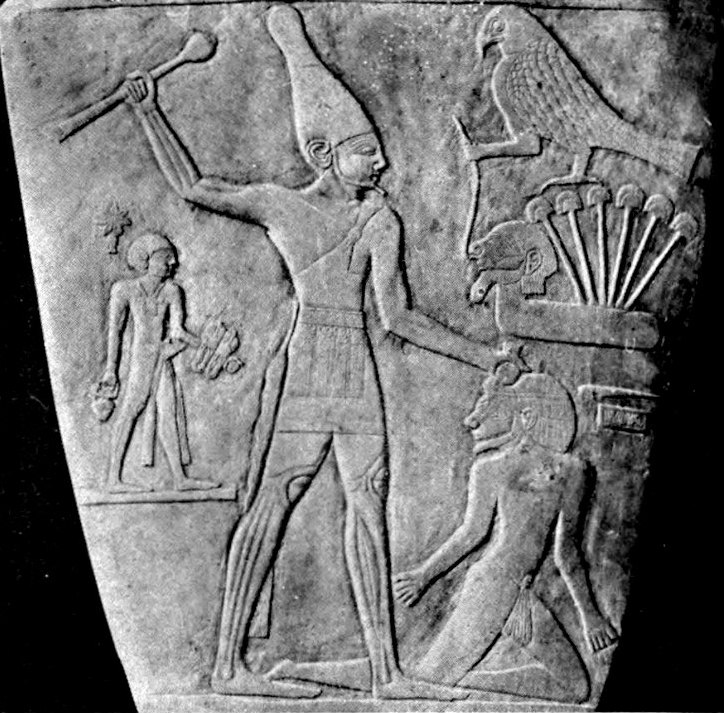
Narmer Palette (circa 3000 BCE). The Egyptian symbol of the king smiting his enemies with a mace was adopted centuries later by the dynasts of Mesopotamia.

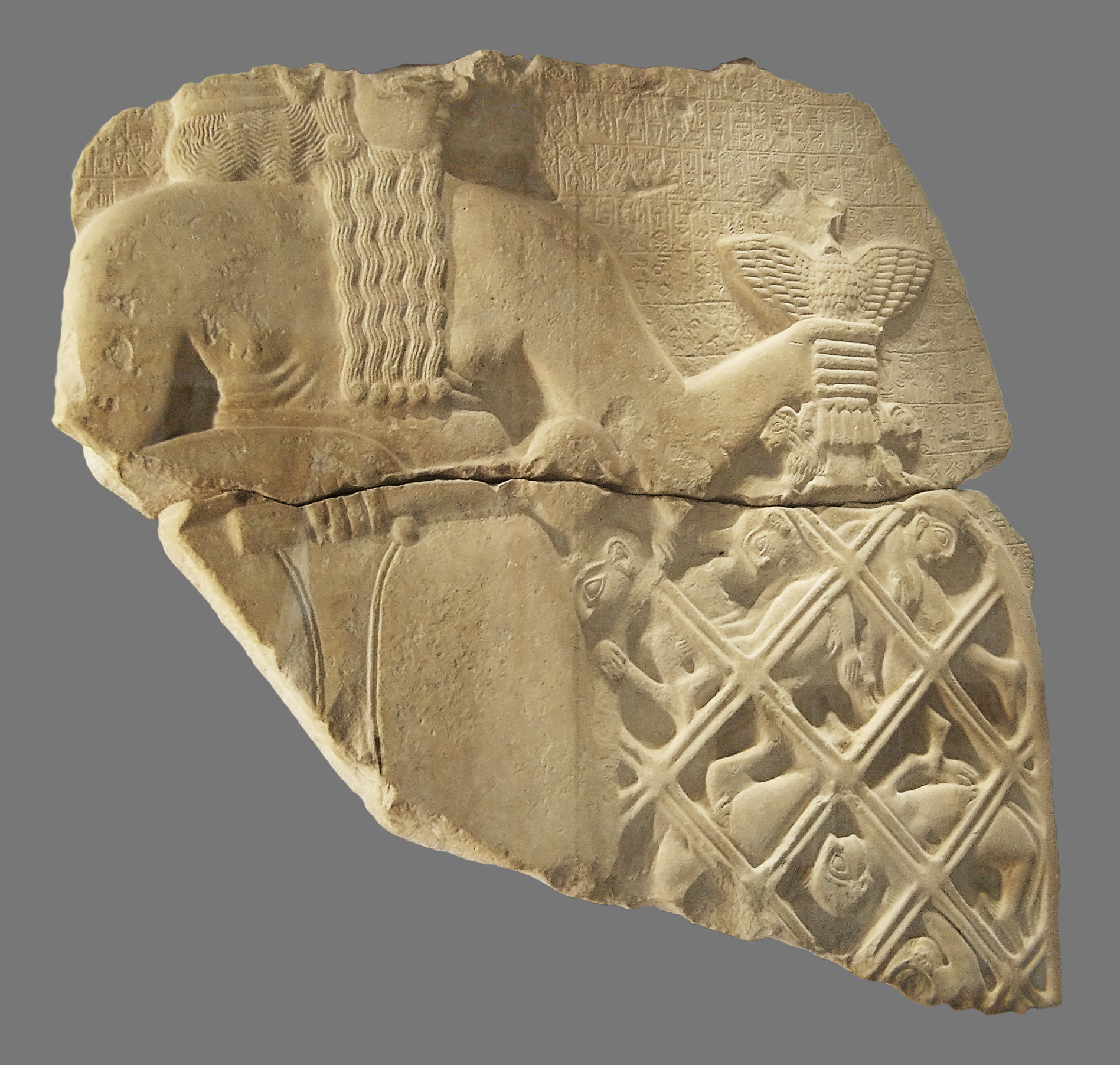
Bare-chested Sumerian king Eannatum smiting an enemy with a mace. The dynastic bird also shares the same position. Stele of the Vultures (circa 2500–2400 BCE).

After this early period of exchange, and the direct introduction of Mesopotamian components into Egyptian culture, Egypt soon started to assert its own style from the Early Dynastic Period (3150–2686 BCE), the Narmer palette being seen as a turning point.

Egypt seems to have provided some artistic feedback to Mesopotamia at the time of the Early Dynastic Period of Mesopotamia (2900–2334 BCE). This is especially the case with royal iconography: the figure of the king smiting his enemies with a mace, and the depiction of dead enemies being eaten by birds of prey appeared in Egypt from the time of the Narmer palette, and were then adopted centuries later (possibly from Egypt) by Mesopotamian rulers Eannatum and Sargon of Akkad. This depiction appears to be part of an artistic system to promote "hegemonistic kingship". Another example is the usage of decorated mace heads as a symbol of kingship.

There is also a possibility that the depictions of the Mesopotamian king with a muscular, naked, upper body fighting his enemies in a quadrangular posture, as seen in the Stele of Naram-Sin or statues of Gudea (all circa 2000 BCE) were derived from Egyptian sculpture, which by that time had already been through its Golden Age during the Old Kingdom.

== Genetic connections ==
=== Mesopotamian component of Early Dynastic Egyptians ===
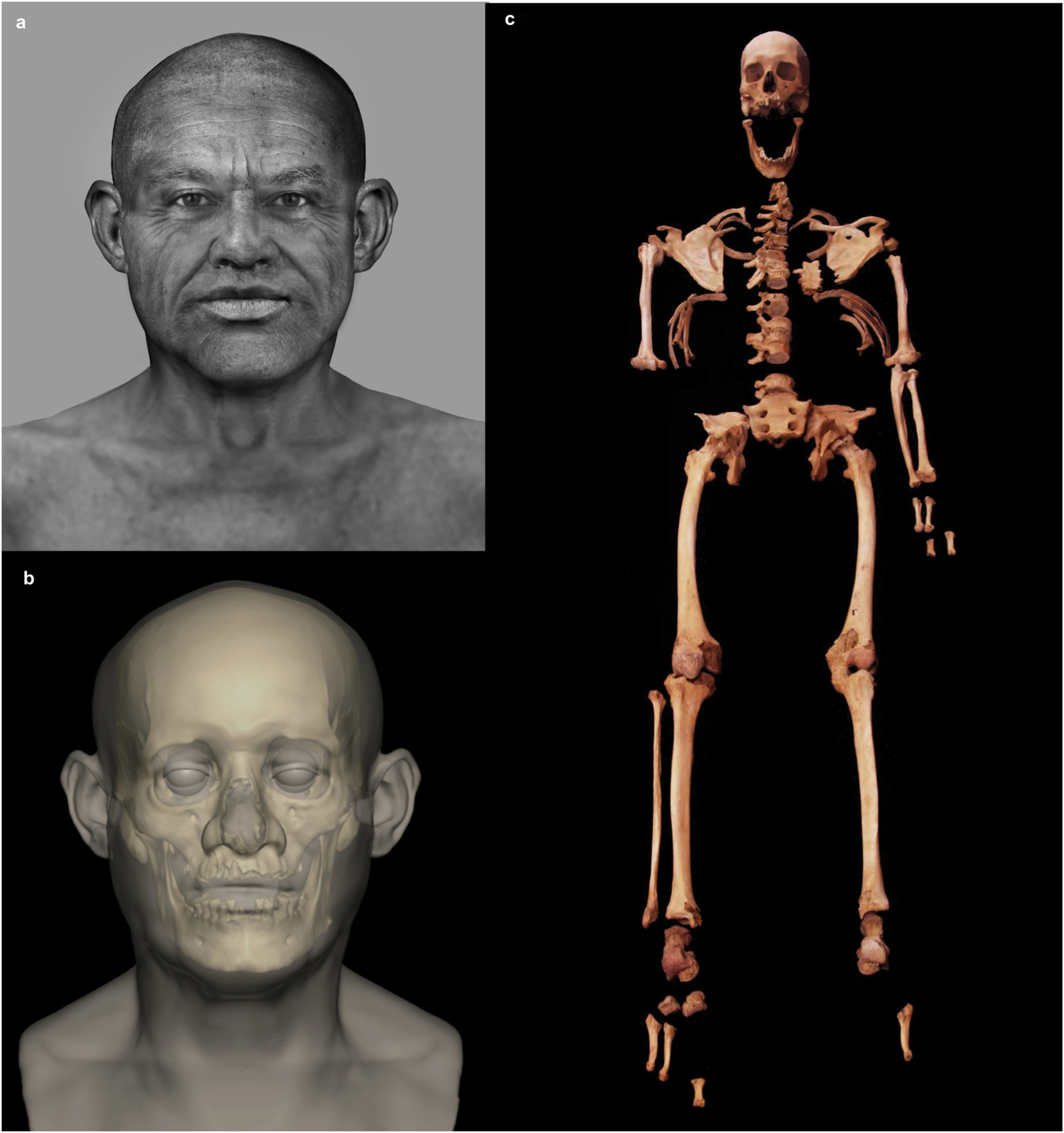
Facial reconstruction and depiction created from the Nuwayrat individual skull.

For the first time in 2025, a study was able to give insights into the genetic background of Early Dynastic Egyptians, by sequencing the whole genome of an Old Kingdom adult male Egyptian of relatively high-status, radiocarbon-dated to 2855–2570 BCE, with funerary practices archeologically attributed to the Third and Fourth Dynasty, which was excavated in Nuwayrat (Nuerat, نويرات), in a cliff 265 km south of Cairo. Before this study, whole-genome sequencing of ancient Egyptians from the early periods of Egyptian Dynastic history had not yet been accomplished, mainly because of the problematic DNA preservation conditions in Egypt.

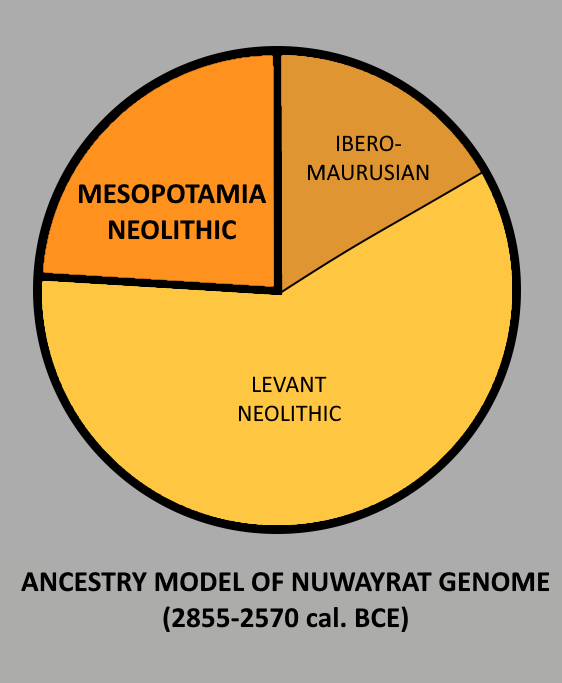
Ancestry model of Egyptian genome from Nuwayrat.

The corpse had been placed intact in a large circular clay pot without embalming, and then installed inside a cliff tomb, which accounts for the comparatively good level of conservation of the skeleton and its DNA.

Most of his genome derives from Neolithic North African ancestry, itself rooted in a Levantine expansion into northeast Africa ~8,000 years ago. The diffusion of this ancestry, later admixed with local components as seen in both Skhirat-Rouazi individuals and eastern African pastoralist groups, correlates closely with the introduction of southwest Asian domesticates such as sheep, goats, and cattle, coinciding with the rise of Saharan cattle pastoralism and the appearance of Ashakar Ware pottery in the Maghreb, and may have contributed to the early dispersal of Afro-Asiatic languages across North Africa.

The remaining ~20% of his genetic ancestry derives from populations of the eastern Fertile Crescent, including Mesopotamia. The resulting genetic profile is most closely represented by a two-source model, in which 77.6% ± 3.8% of the ancestry corresponded to genomes from the Middle Neolithic Moroccan site of Skhirat-Rouazi (dated to 4780–4230 BCE), which itself consists of predominantly (76.4 ± 4.0%) Levant Neolithic ancestry and (23.6 ± 4.0%) minor Iberomaurusian ancestry, while the remainder (22.4% ± 3.8%) was most closely related to known genomes from Neolithic Mesopotamia (dated to 9000-8000 BCE).

In a three-source model, an additional stream of Neolithic/Chalcolithic Levant ancestry appears as a third, smaller component. A 2022 DNA study had already shown evidence of gene flow from the Mesopotamian and Zagros regions into surrounding areas, including Anatolia, during the Neolithic, but not as far as Egypt yet.

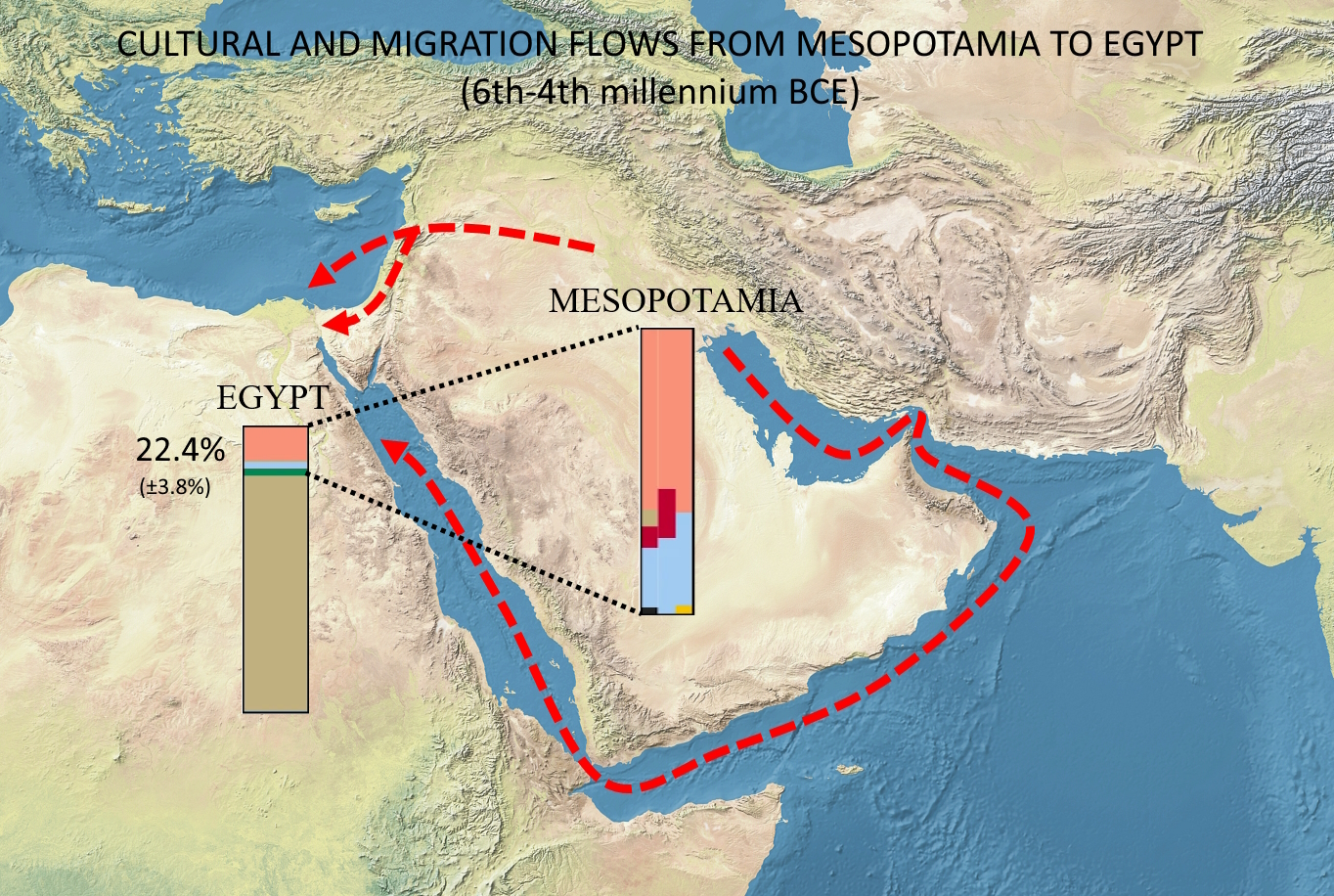
Cultural and migration flows from Mesopotamia to Egypt with genetic contribution (6th-4th millennium BCE).

In terms of chronology, Egypt was one of the first areas to adopt the Neolithic package emerging from West Asia as early as the 6th millennium BCE. Population genetics in the Nile Valley observed a marked change around this period, as shown by odontometric and dental tissue changes. Cultural exchange and trade between the two regions then continued through the 4th millennium BCE, as shown by the transfer of Mesopotamian Late Uruk period features to the Nile Valley of the later Predynastic Period. Migrations flows from Mesopotamia accompanied such cultural exchanges, possibly through the sea routes of the Mediterranean and the Red Sea or through yet un-sampled intermediaries in the Levant, which could explain the relative smallness of genetic influence from known Chalcolithic/Bronze Age Levantines populations.

The authors acknowledged some limitations of the study such as the results deriving from one single Egyptian genome and that DNA analysis whilst indicative of population origin does not provide any evidence in relation to skin colour or facial hair.

Overall, the 2025 study "provides direct evidence of genetic ancestry related to the eastern Fertile Crescent in ancient Egypt". This genetic connection suggests that there had been ancient migration flows from the eastern Fertile Crescent to Egypt, in addition to the exchanges of objects and imagery (domesticated animals and plants, writing systems...) already observed. This suggests a pattern of wide cultural and demographic expansion from the Mesopotamian region, which affected both Anatolia and Egypt during this period.

== Later periods ==
=== Trade of Indus goods through Mesopotamia ===
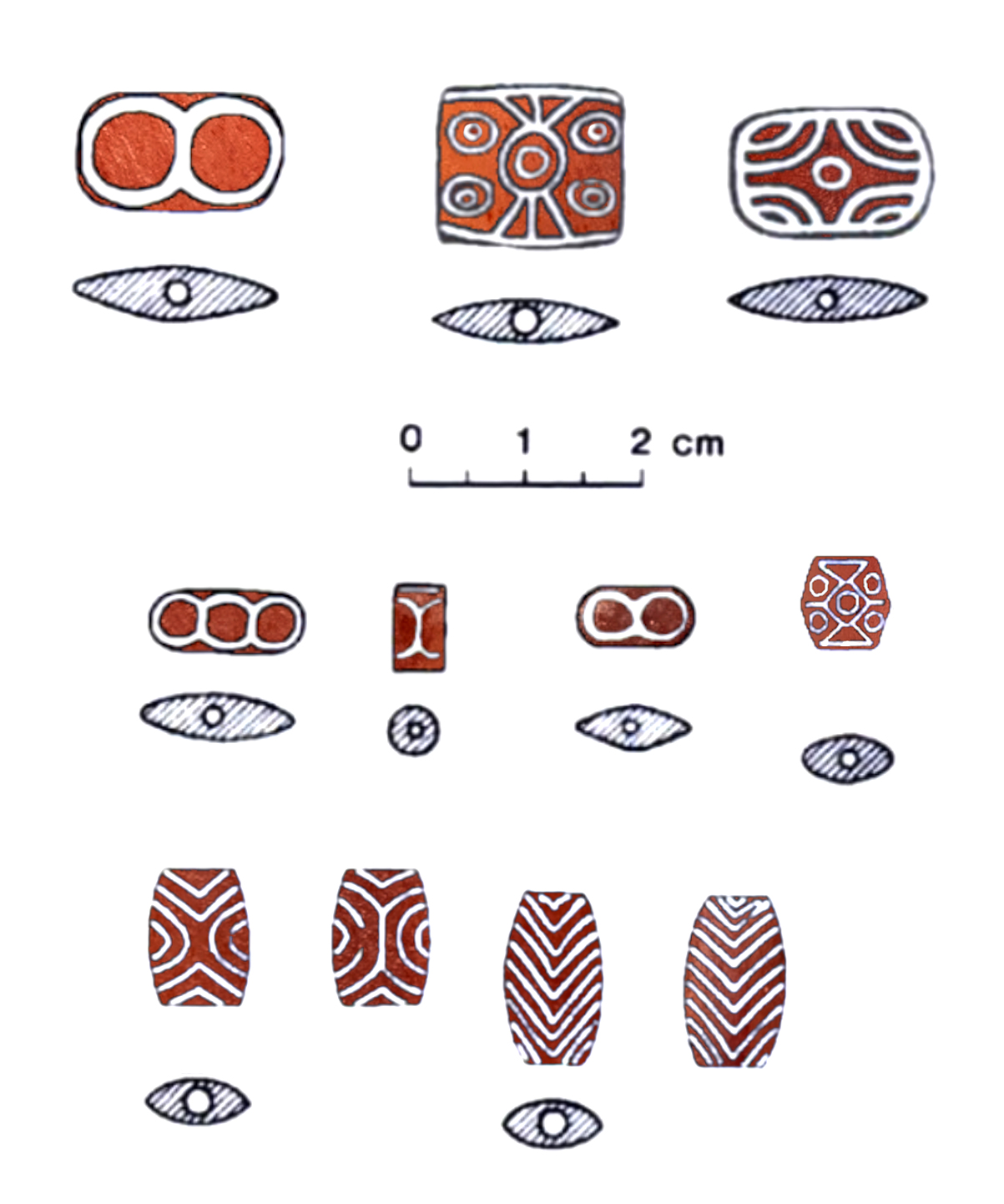
Indus Valley Civilization etched carnelian beads.

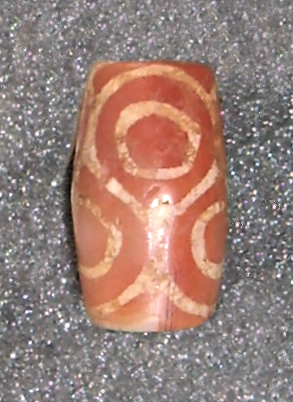
Bead excavated in Egypt, circa 1800 BCE.

==== Etched carnelian beads ====
Rare etched carnelian beads have been found in Egypt, which are thought to have been imported from the Indus Valley Civilization via Mesopotamian states of Sumer, Akkad and Assyria. This is related to the flourishing of the Indus Valley Civilization, and the development of Indus-Mesopotamia relations from 2600 BCE to 1900 BCE. Examples of etched carnelian beads found in Egypt typically date to the Late Middle Kingdom (c. 1800 BCE). They were found in tombs and represented luxury items, often as the centerpiece of jewelry.

=== Hyksos period ===
West Asiatic procession to Egypt (c.1900 BCE)
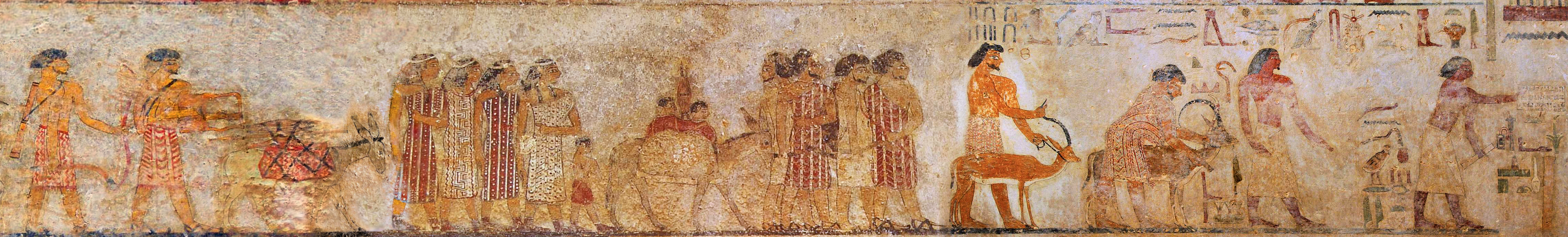
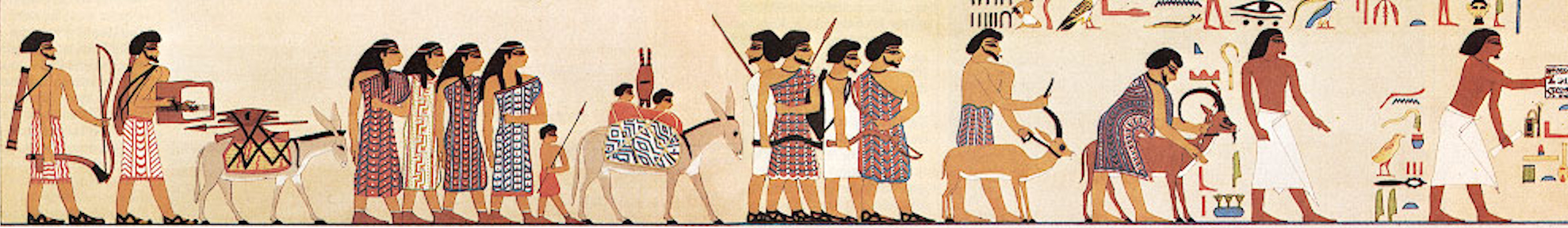
A group of West Asiatic foreigners labelled as Aamu (ꜥꜣmw), including the leading man with a Nubian ibex labelled as Abisha the Hyksos (𓋾𓈎𓈉 ḥḳꜣ-ḫꜣsw, Heqa-kasut for "Hyksos"). Tomb of 12th-dynasty official Khnumhotep II, at Beni Hasan (circa 1900 BCE).

Egypt records various exchanges with Semitic West Asian foreigners from around 1900 BCE, as in the paintings of the tomb of Khnumhotep II at Beni Hassan.

From circa 1650 BCE, the Hyksos, Semitic foreigners of Canaanite Levantine origin, established the Fifteenth Dynasty of Egypt (1650–1550 BCE) based at the city of Avaris in the Nile Delta, from where they ruled the northern part of the country. Khyan, one of the Hyksos rulers, is known for his wide-ranging contacts, as objects in his name have been found at Knossos and Hattusha indicating diplomatic contacts with the Minoans of Crete and the Hittites and Hurrians of Anatolia, and a sphinx with his name was bought on the art market at Baghdad and might demonstrate diplomatic contacts with the Mesopotamian states of Assyria and Babylonia, possibly with the first Kassites ruler Gandash.

Exchanges would again flourish between the two cultures from the period of the New Kingdom of Egypt (c. 1550 – c. 1069 BCE) and the Middle Assyrian Empire (c. 1392 – c. 1025 BCE) this time an exchange between two mature and well-established civilizations. These exchanges also included tributes of gold paid to Assyrian kings during the 16th and 15th centuries BCE, in an attempt to ellicit their support in Egypt's conflict with the Hittite and Hurrian-Mitanni empires. Assyria eventually annexed much of the territory of the former, and completely destroyed the latter, and the growing power of Assyria may have been a factor in Egypt withdrawing from their Levantine colonies, which were subsequently annexed by the Middle Assyrian Empire which came to dominate Western Asia and the East Mediterranean. In the 11th century BCE the Assyrian king Ashur-bel-kala is known to have received a tribute of exotic animals and plants from Egypt for his Zoological and Botanical gardens in Assur.

=== Neo-Assyrian Empire ===
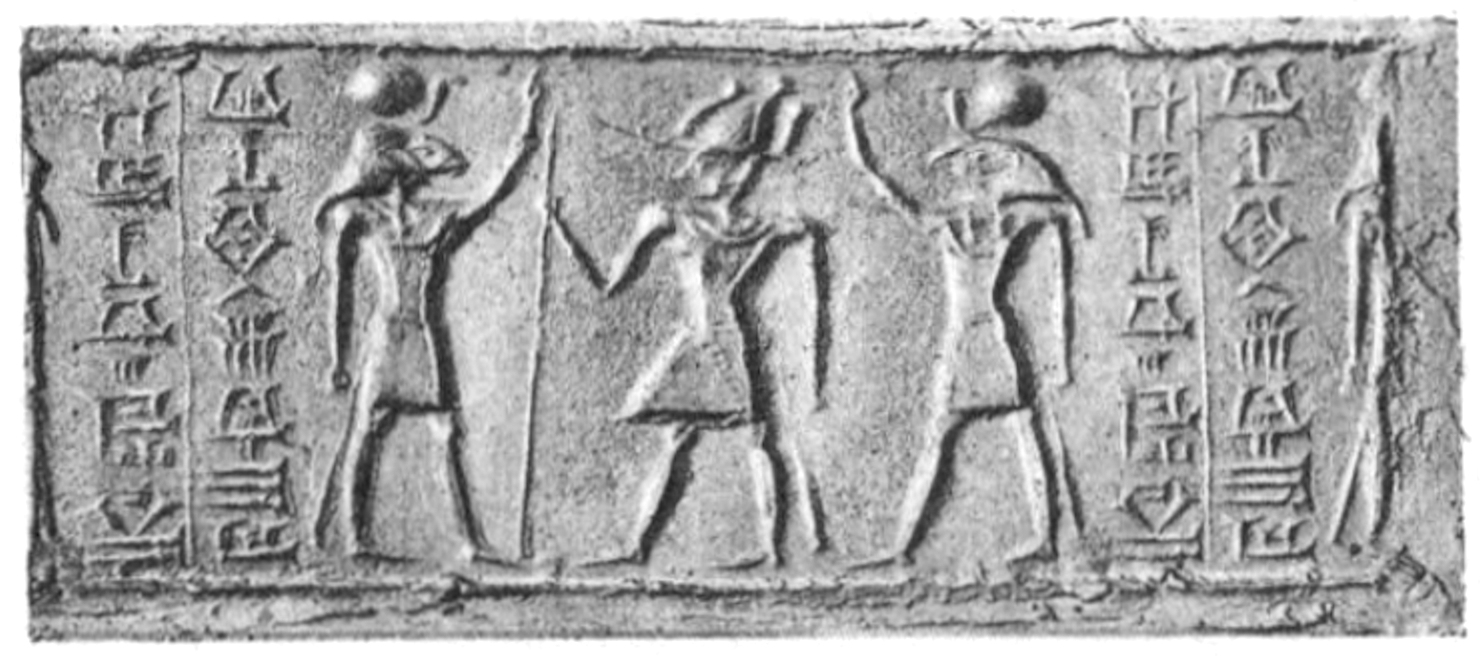
Egypto-Assyrian cylinder seal, combining the Assyrian cuneiform script with Egyptian deities.

In the last phase of historic exchanges during the Neo-Assyrian Empire (935 BC-605 BCE), the Assyrian conquest of Egypt occurred, and Assyrian rule and influence lasted till 655 BCE. after Assyria had invaded and conquered Egypt with remarkable speed, defeating and driving out the Nubian Kushite Empire, the 25th Dynasty of Egypt, which had provoked Assyria by repeatedly but unsuccessfully attempting to gain an influence in the Southern Levant and Northern Arabian Peninsula by instigating and supporting rebellions by Israelites, Judeans, Moabites, Edomites, Phoenicians and Arabs against Assyrian rule during the reigns of Shalmaneser IV, Sargon II and Sennacherib.

The Egyptian 26th Dynasty had been installed in 663 BCE as native puppet rulers by the Assyrians after the destruction and deportation of the foreign Nubians of the 25th Dynasty by king Esarhaddon and then came under the dominion of his successors Ashurbanipal. However, during the fall of the Neo Assyrian Empire between 612 and 599 BCE, Egypt attempted to aid its former masters probably due to the fear that without a strong Assyrian buffer they too would be overrun, having already been raided by marauding Scythians. As a result, Egypt came into conflict with Assyria's fellow Mesopotamian state of Babylonia, which along with the Medes, Persians, Chaldeans, Cimmerians and Scythians, amongst others, were fighting to throw off Assyrian rule, and Pharaoh Necho II fought alongside the last Assyrian emperor Ashur-uballit II (612-c.605 BCE) against Nabopolassar, Cyaxares and their allies for a time. After the Assyrian Empire fell, Egypt engaged in a number of conflicts with Babylonia during the late 7th and early 6th century BCE in the Levant, before being driven from the region by Nebuchadnezzar II of Babylonia.

=== Achaemenid Empire ===
The Achaemenid Empire, though Iranic and not Mesopotamian, was heavily influenced by Mesopotamia in its art, architecture, written script and civil administration, the Persians having previously been subjects of Assyria for centuries, invaded Egypt and established satrapies, founding the Achaemenid Twenty-seventh Dynasty of Egypt (525–404 BCE) and Thirty-first Dynasty of Egypt (343–332 BCE).

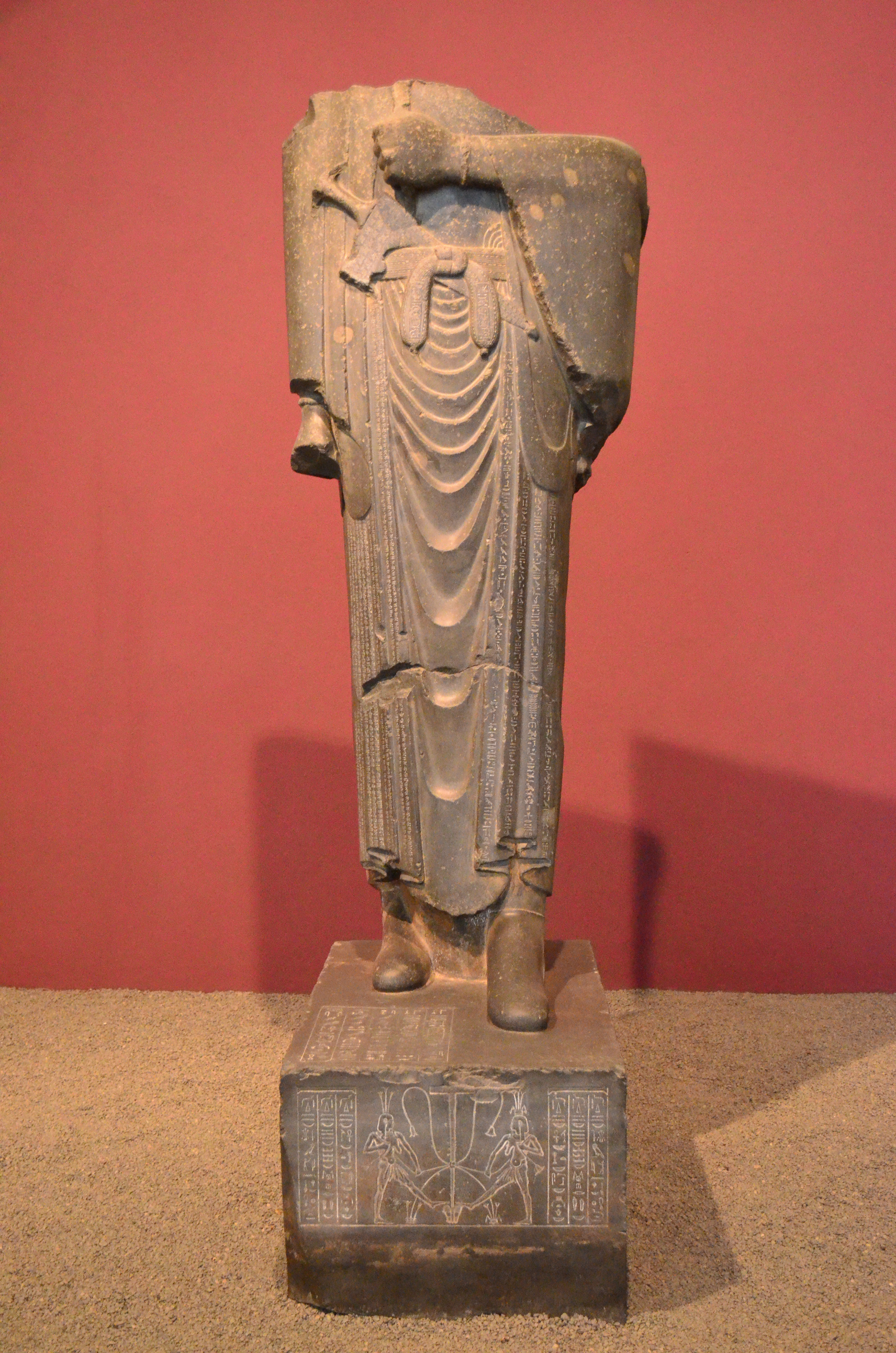
Egyptian statue of Darius I

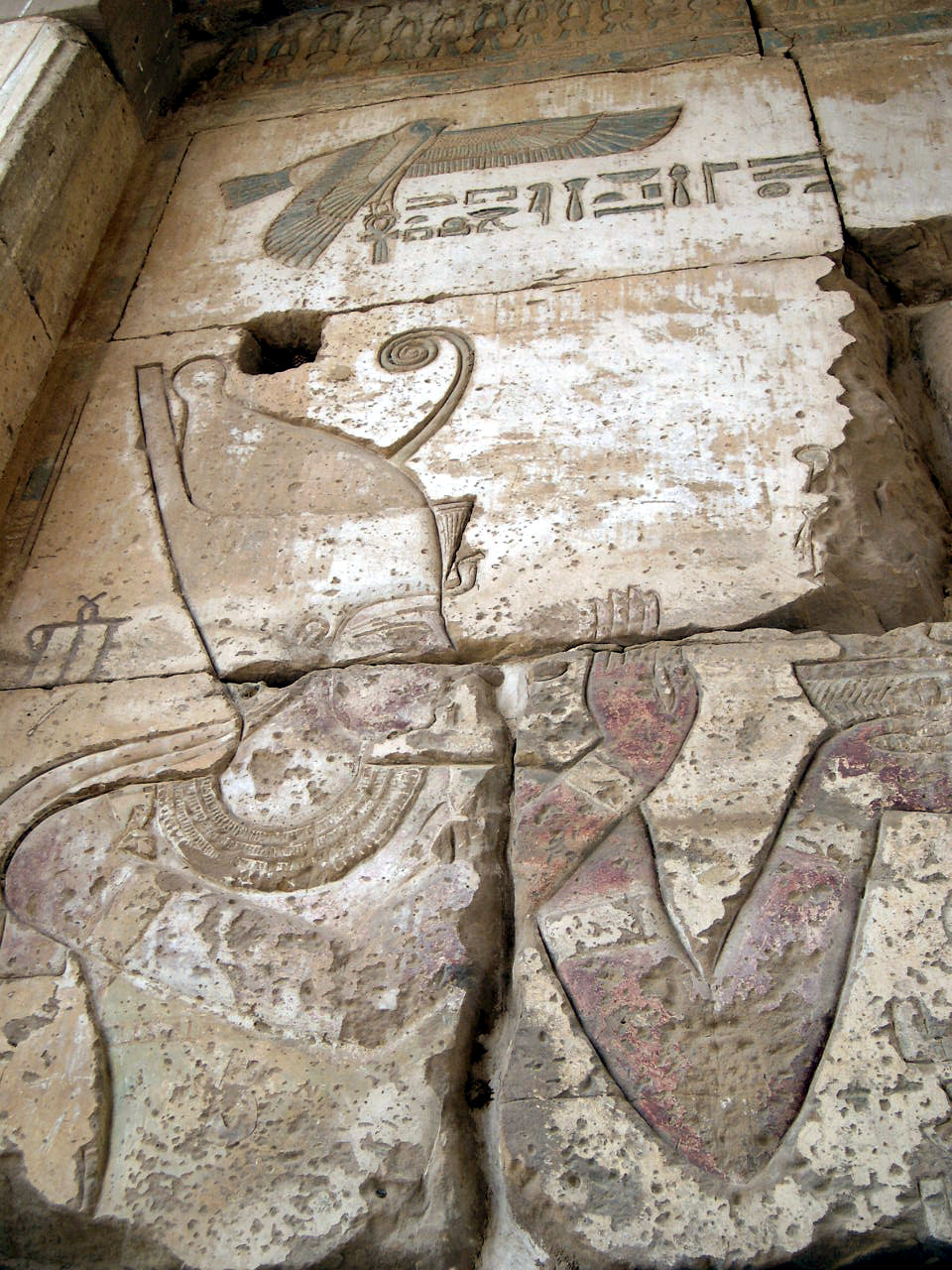
Darius as Pharaoh of Egypt at the Temple of Hibis

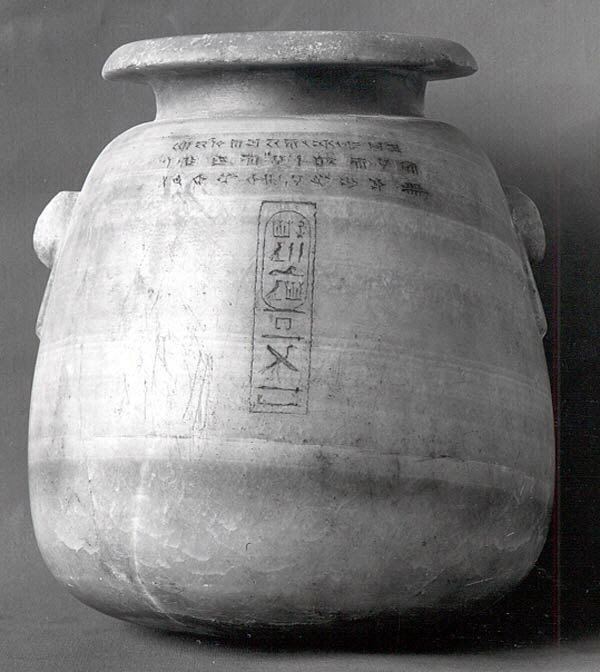
Jar of Xerxes I, with his name in hieroglyphs and cuneiform

== See also ==
- Ancient Egypt
- Archaeogenetics of the Near East
- Assyria
- Babylonia
- Fertile Crescent
- Indus–Mesopotamia relations
- Mesopotamia
- Neolithic Revolution
- Sumer
