= Archaeological Museum of Aegina =

- Αρχαιολογικό Μουσείο Αιγίνης
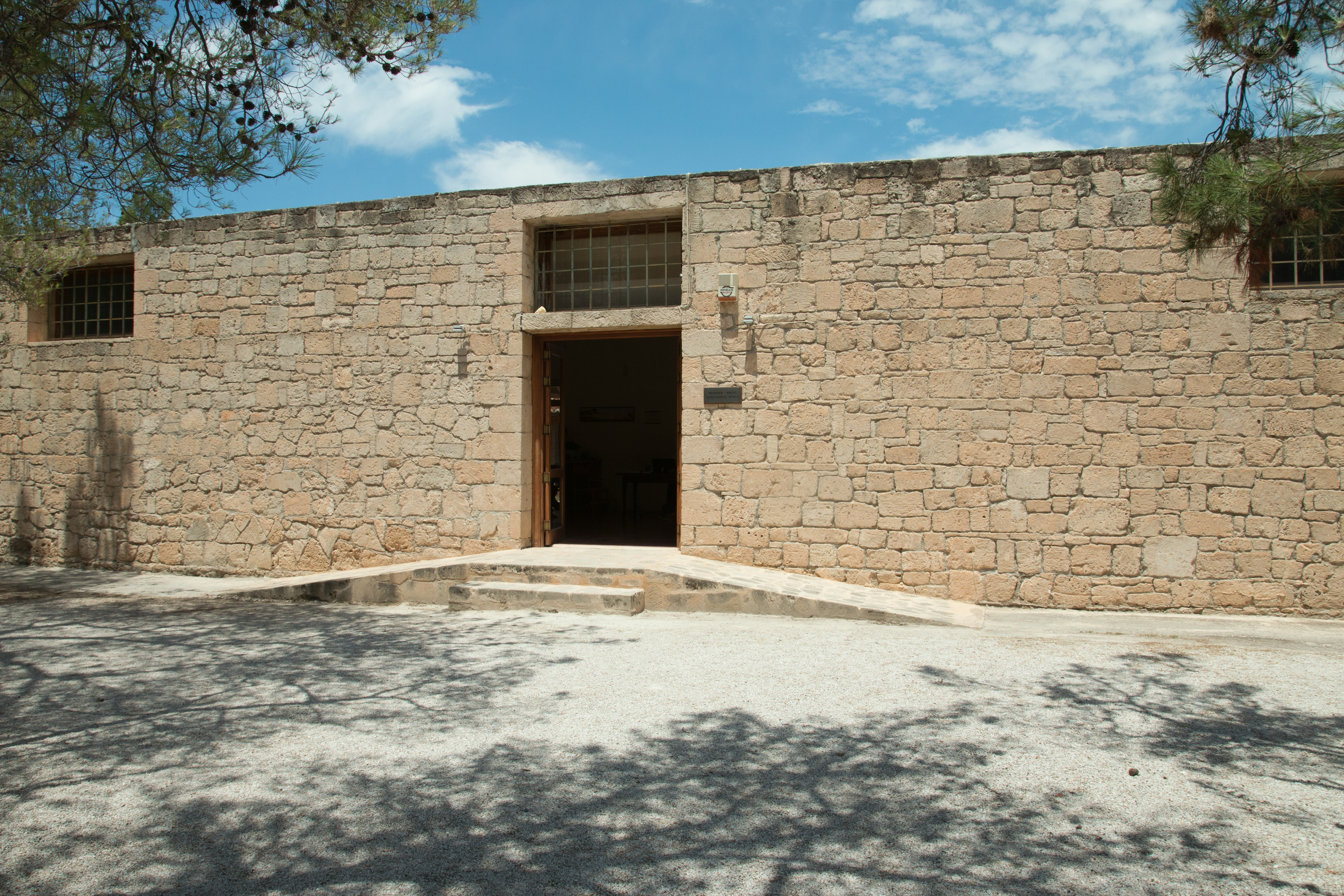
- Entrance to the building

- Location within Greece
- Established: 21 October 1828
- Location: Aegina, Greece
- Coordinates: 37.749519°N 23.424773°E
- Type: Archaeological museum
- Founder: Ioannis Kapodistrias
- Website: via odysseus.culture.gr

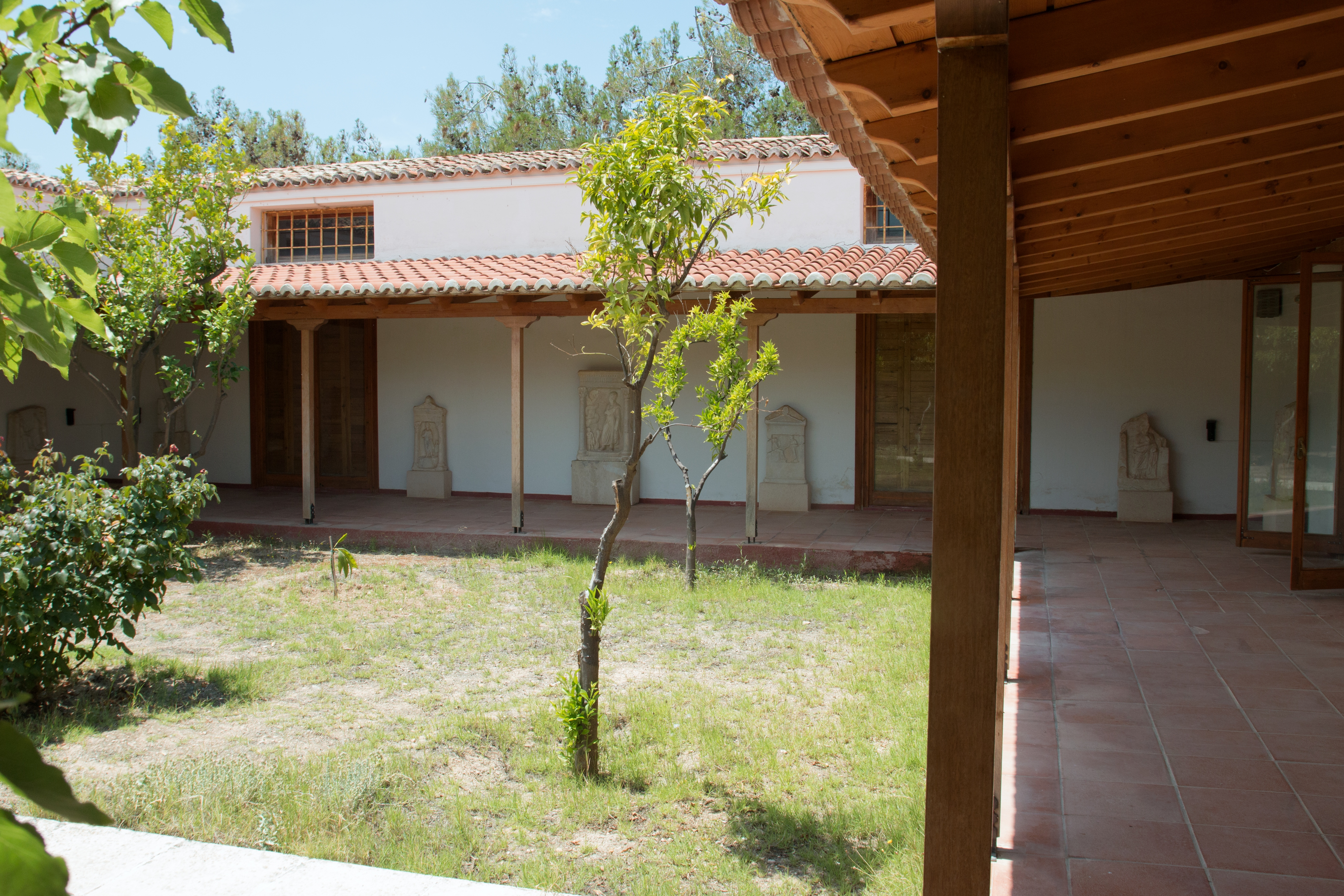
Roman tombstones at museum's lapidarium

The Archaeological Museum of Aegina (Greek: Αρχαιολογικό Μουσείο Αιγίνης) is a museum in Aegina, Greece, founded on 21 October 1828 by Ioannis Kapodistrias, the first governor of independent Greece.

== Exhibits ==
The museum contains a variety of ancient vessels, pottery, ceramics, alabasters, statuettes, inscriptions, coins, weapons and copper vessels. These objects are located in three rooms in which are all the exhibits.

One of the artifacts of the museum, an etched carnelian bead, a typical Harappan object, points to ancient trade relations with Mesopotamia and the Indus Valley civilization.

The building where the museum is housed is ground floor, equilateral, stone and tiled with a patio in the center, a wooden portico surrounds the patio and one exterior of the building.

== Gallery ==
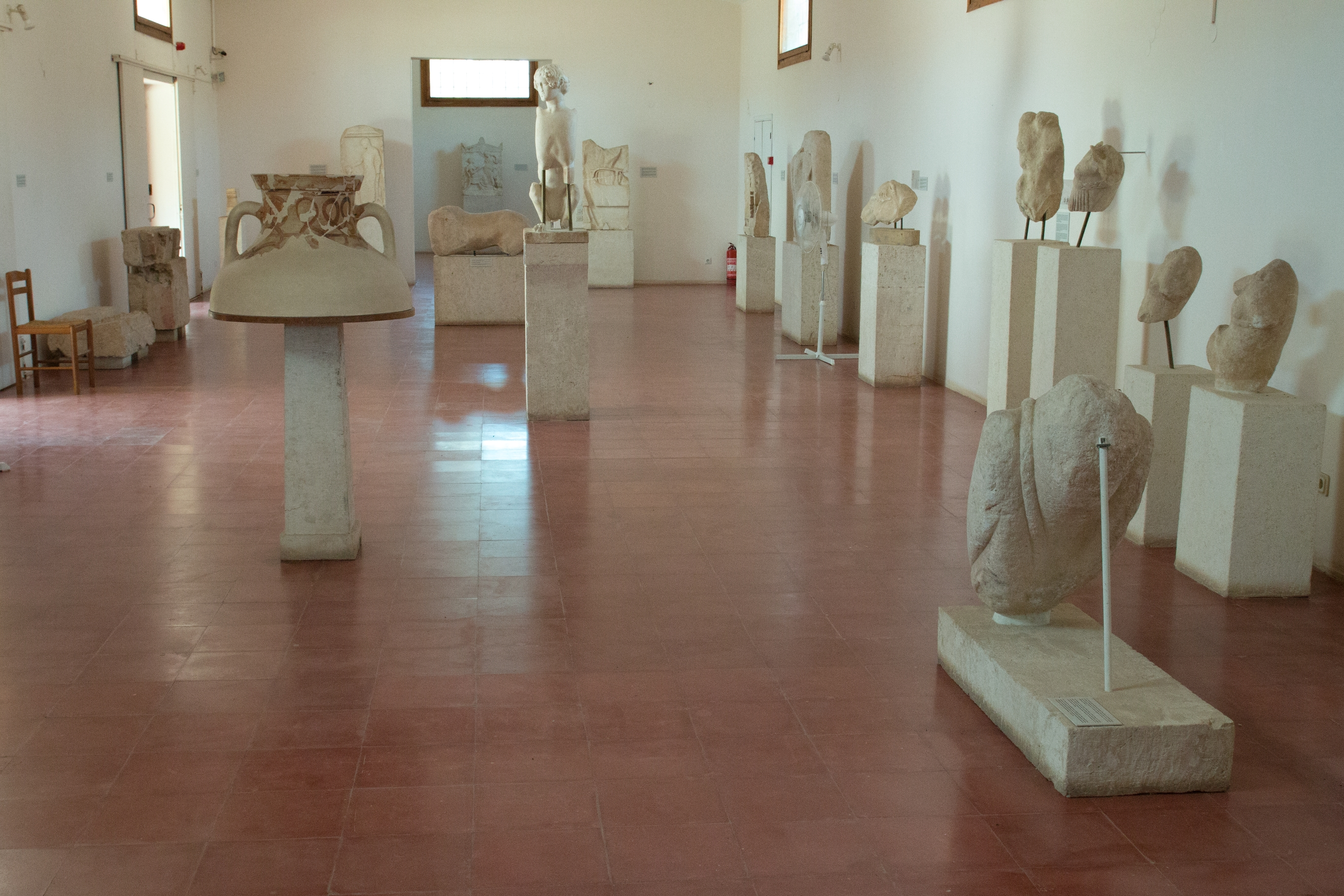
Part of the hall of ancient sculptures and pottery.

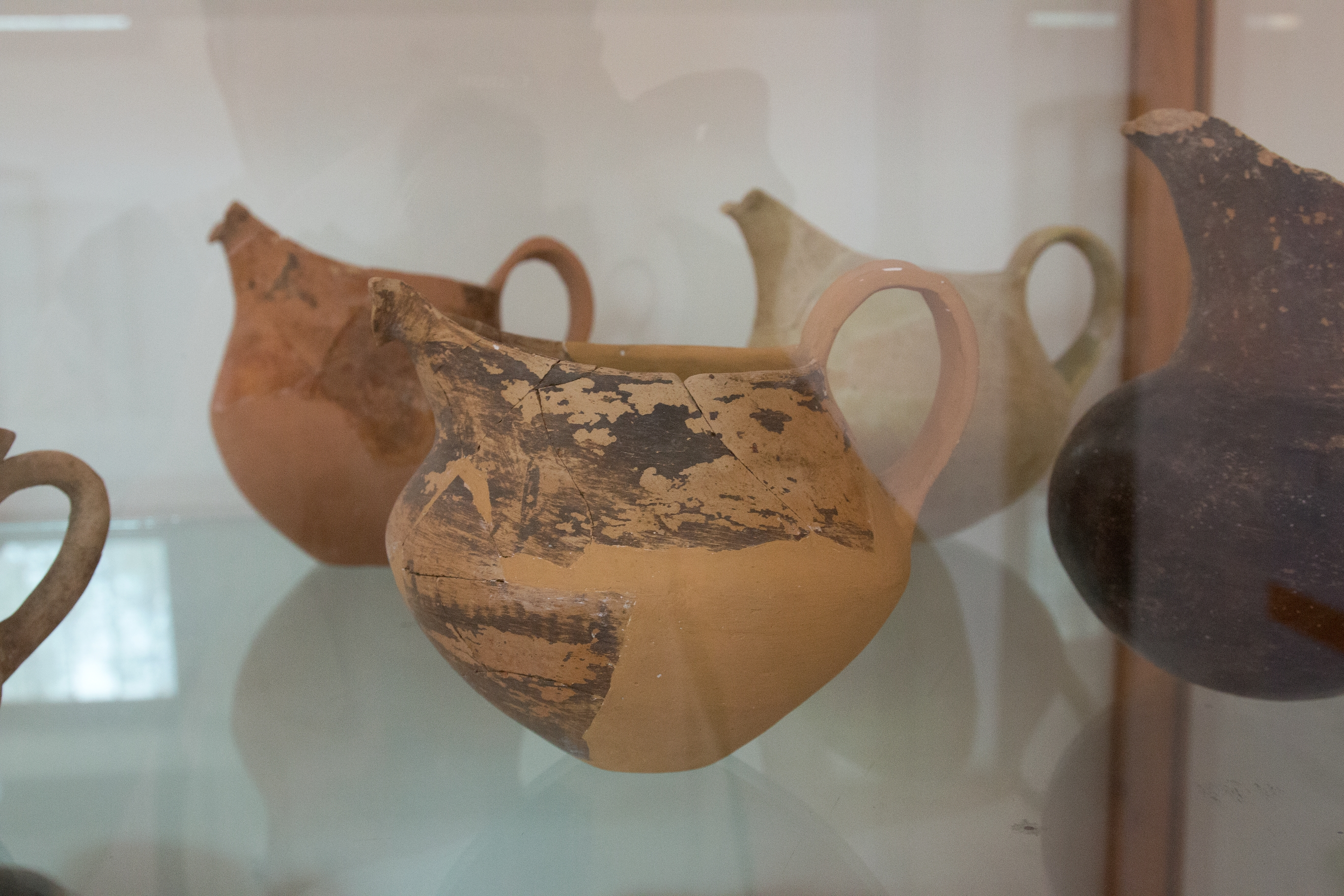
Early Bronze Age pottery, Early Helladic II, c. 2400–2300 BC.

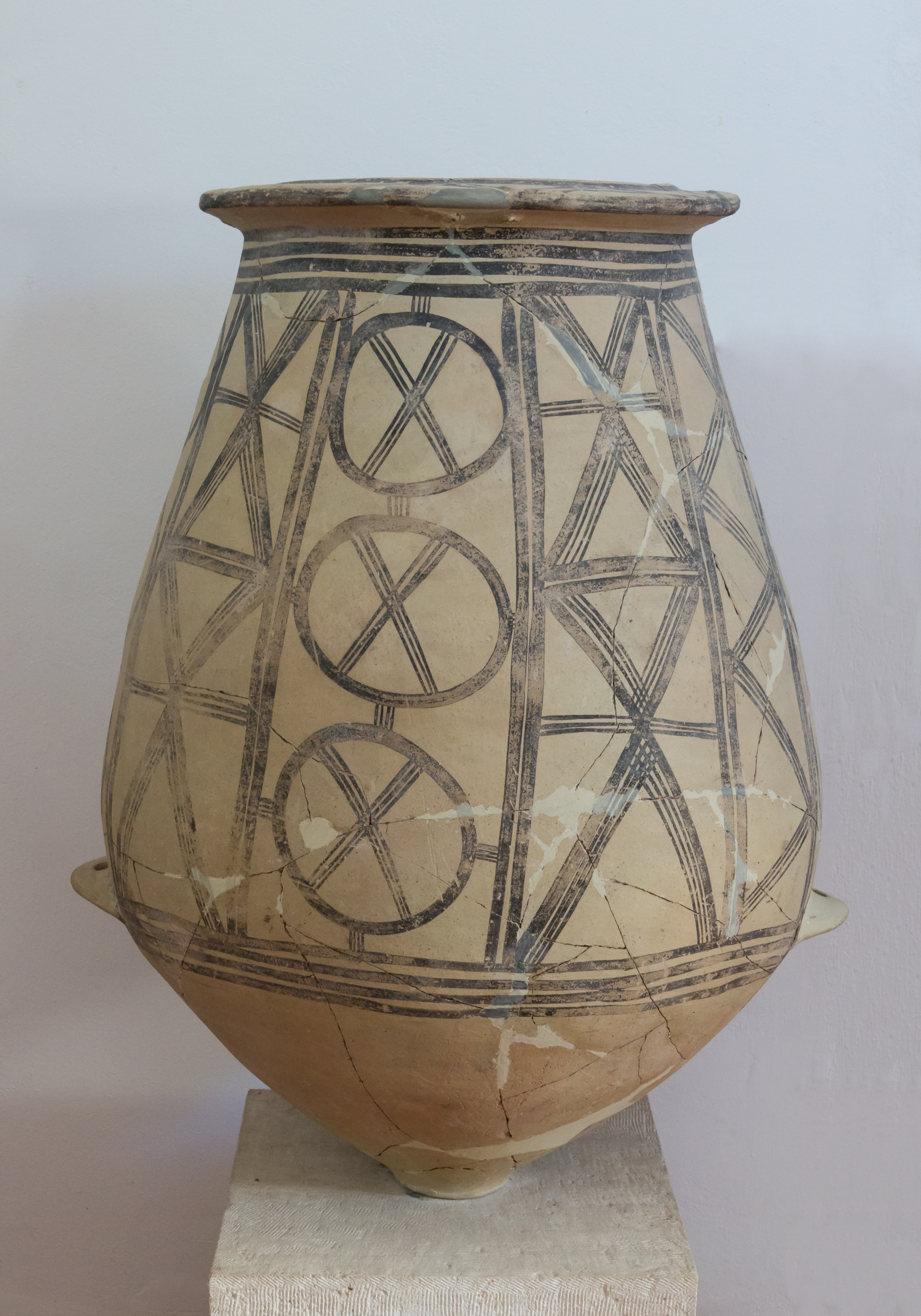
Middle Bronze Age pithos with geometric painted decorations, c. 2000–1800 BC.

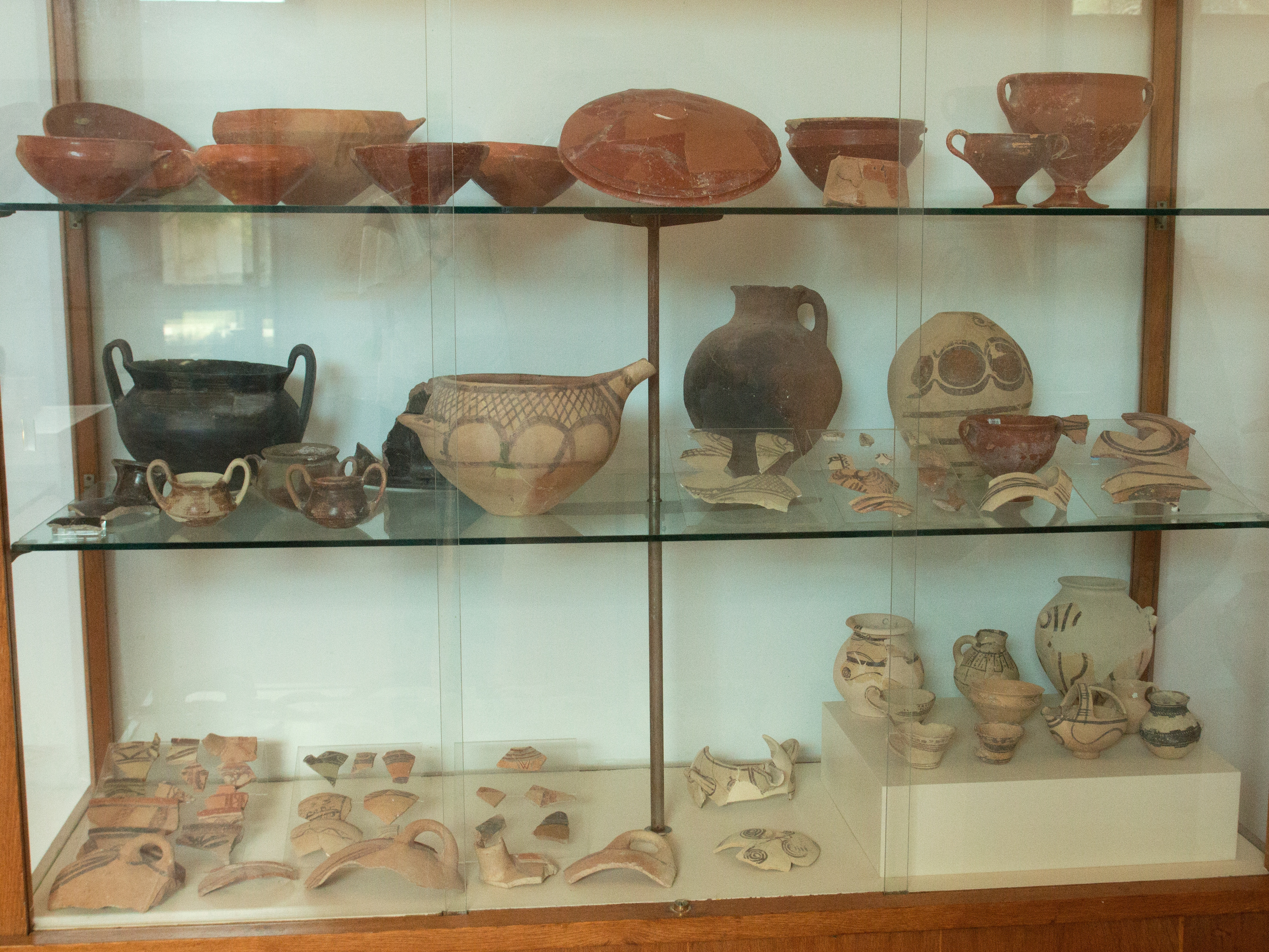
Middle Helladic and early Mycenaean pottery, c. 1900–1650 BC.

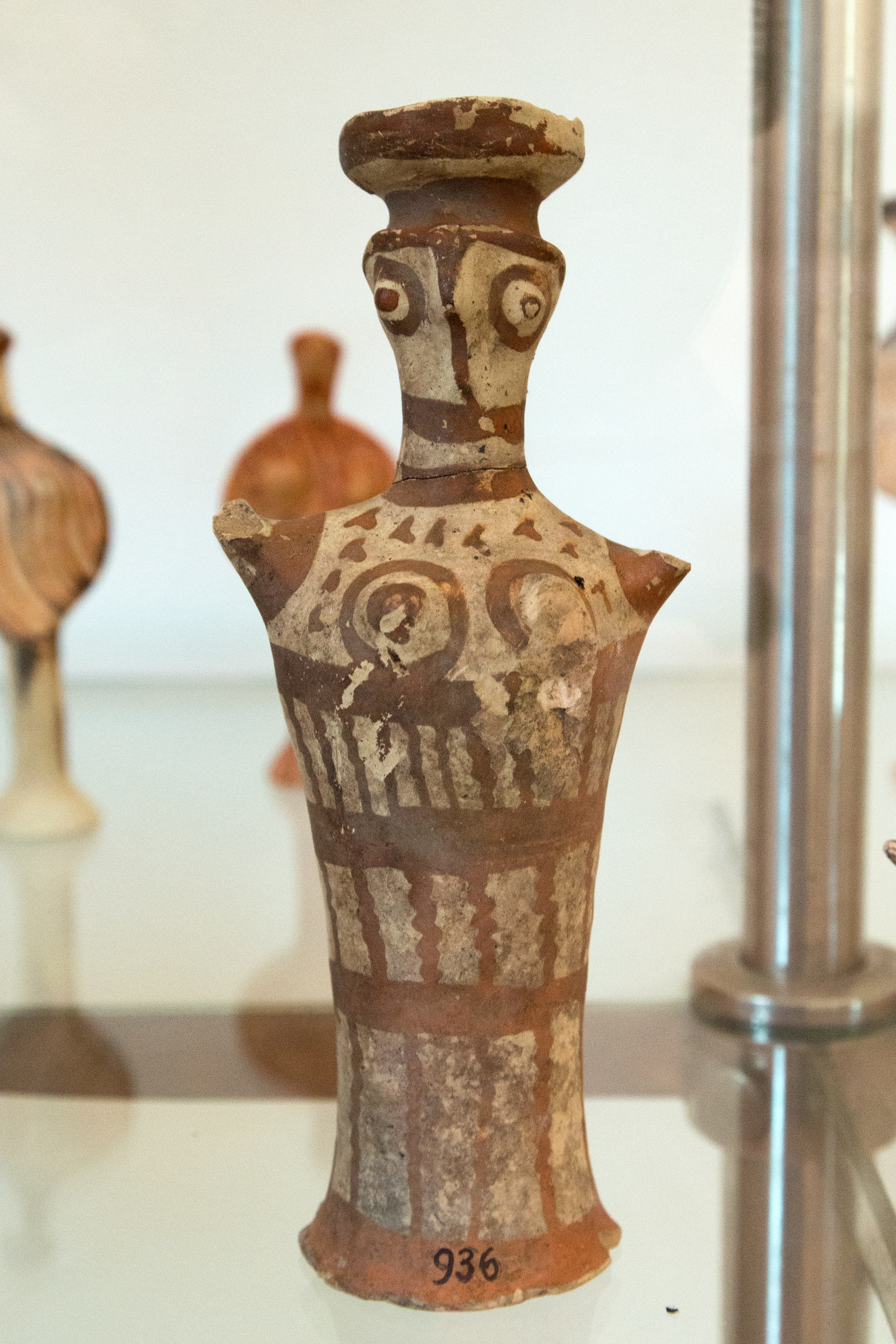
Mycenaean figurine, c. 1700–1050 BC.

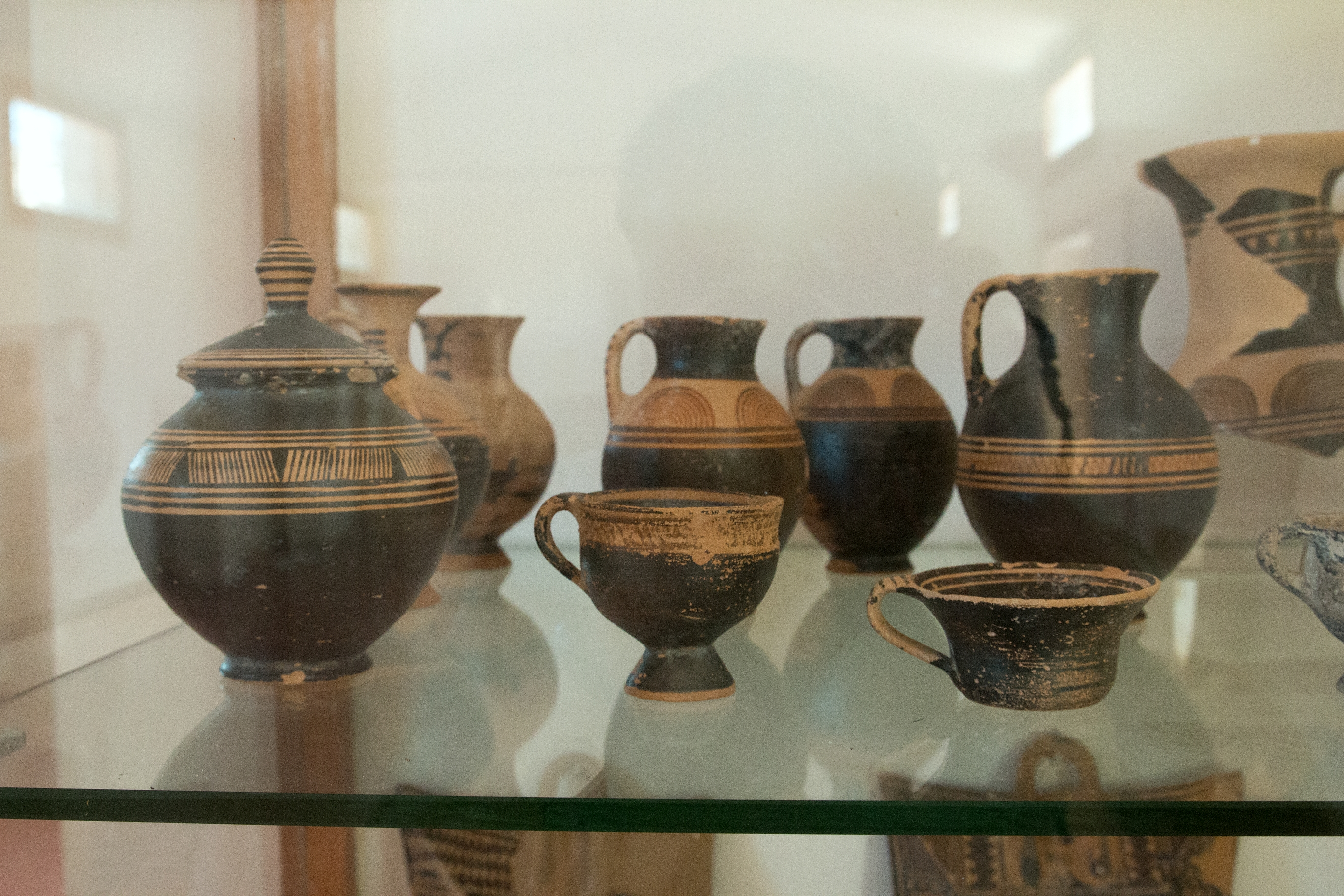
Protogeometric and geometric pottery, 10th–8th century BC.

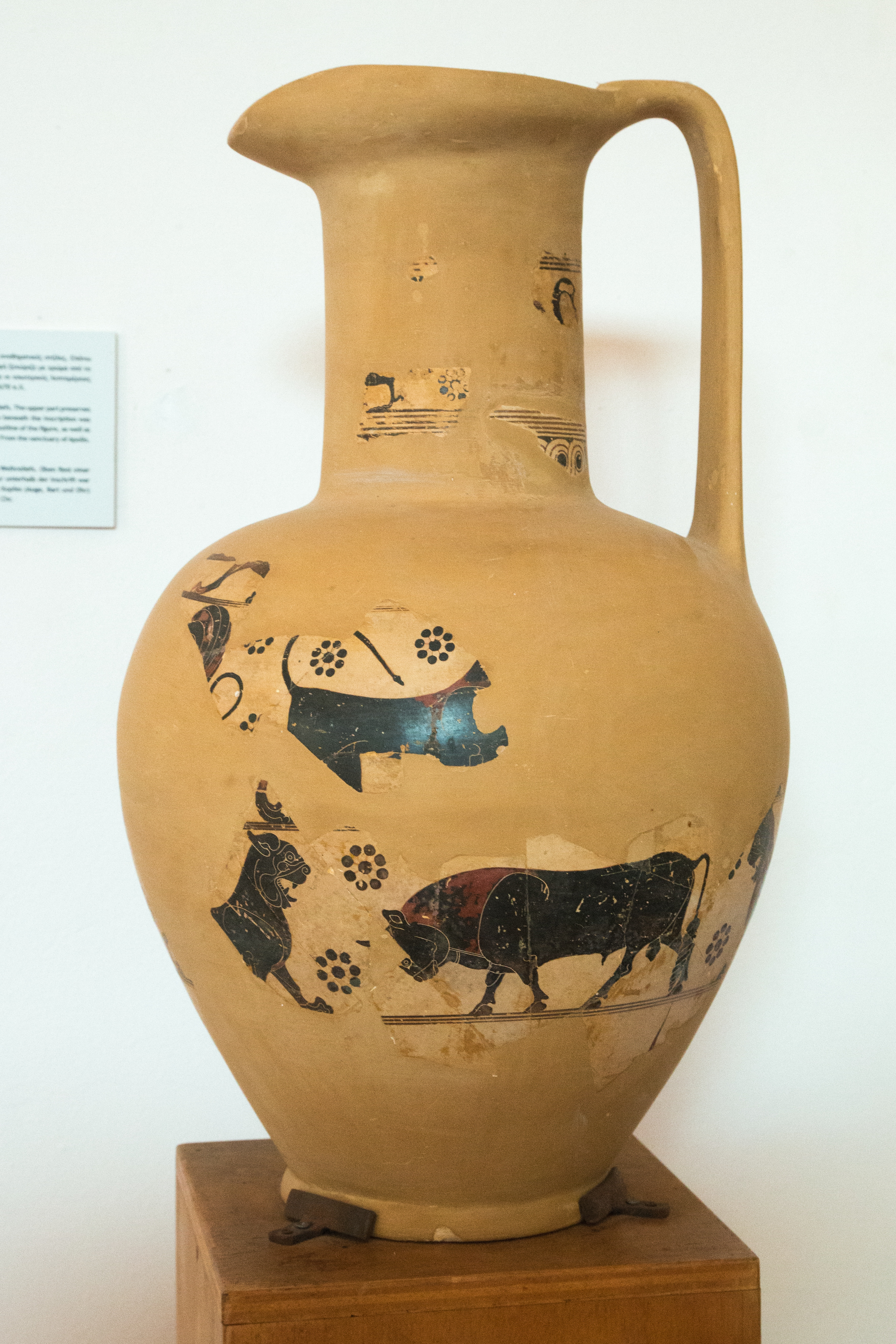
Large Corinthian jug, c. 600 BC.

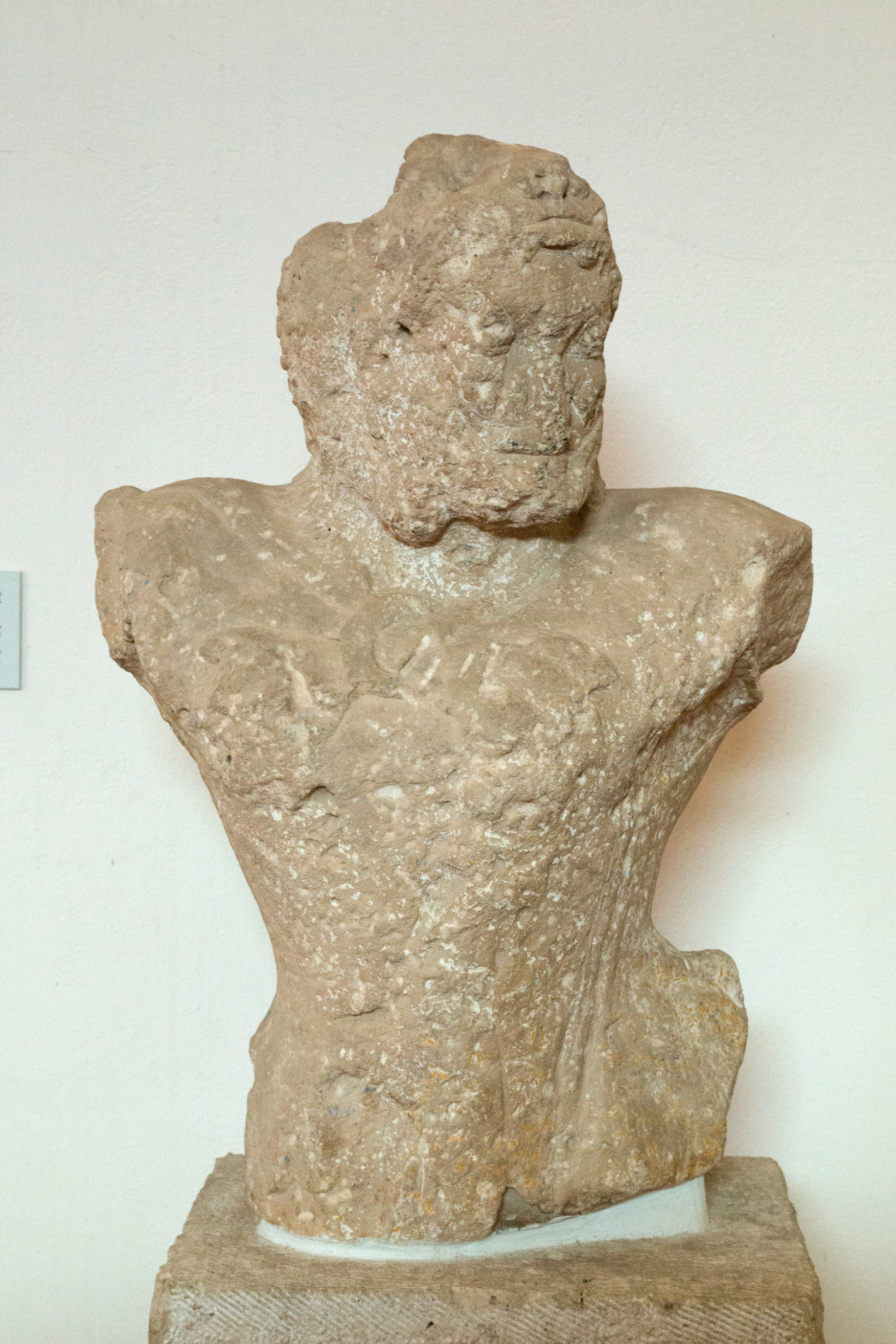
Torso of a statue of Heracles, from older temple of Apollo, c. 570–560 BC.

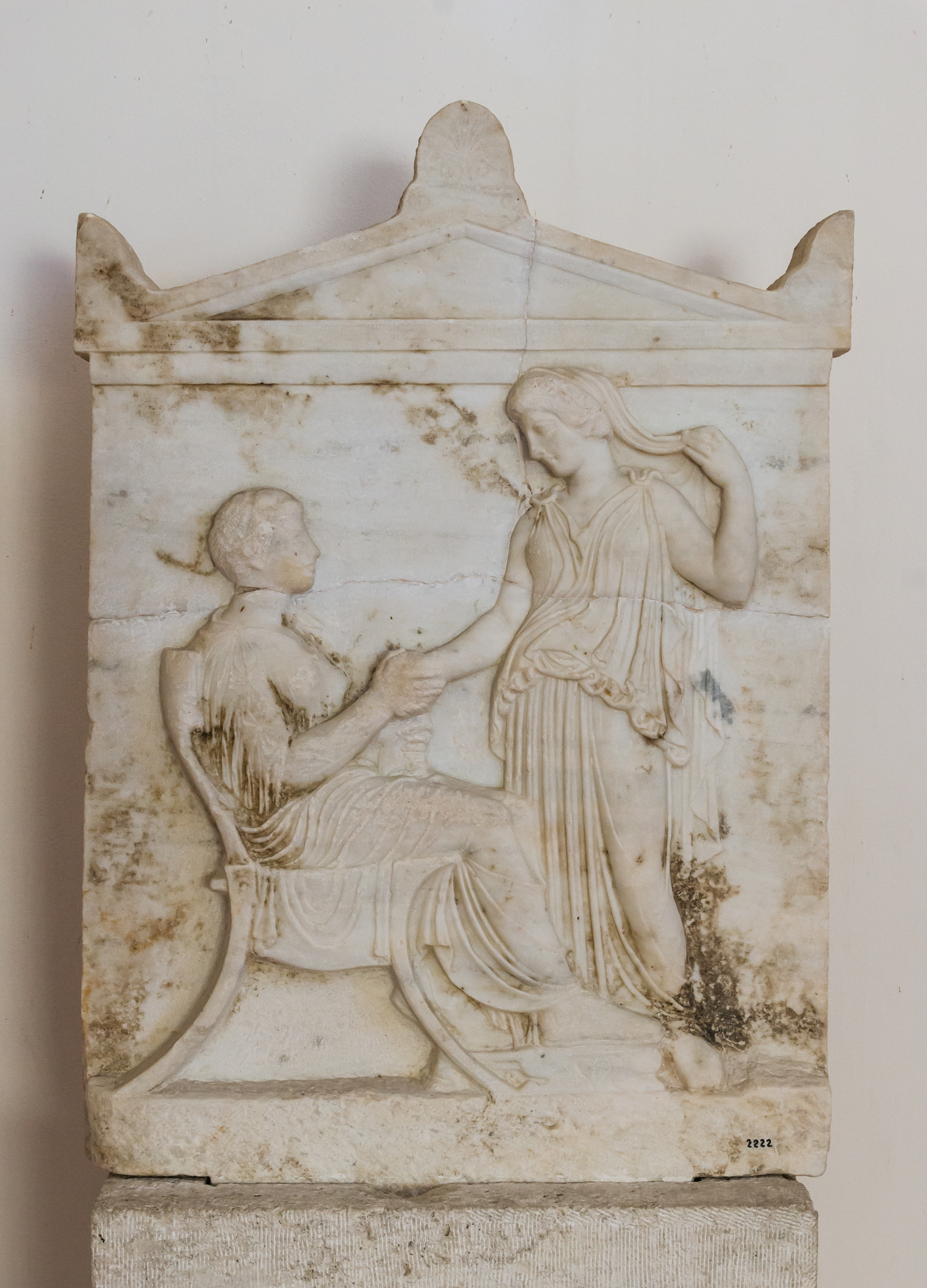
Funerary relief, 5th century BC.

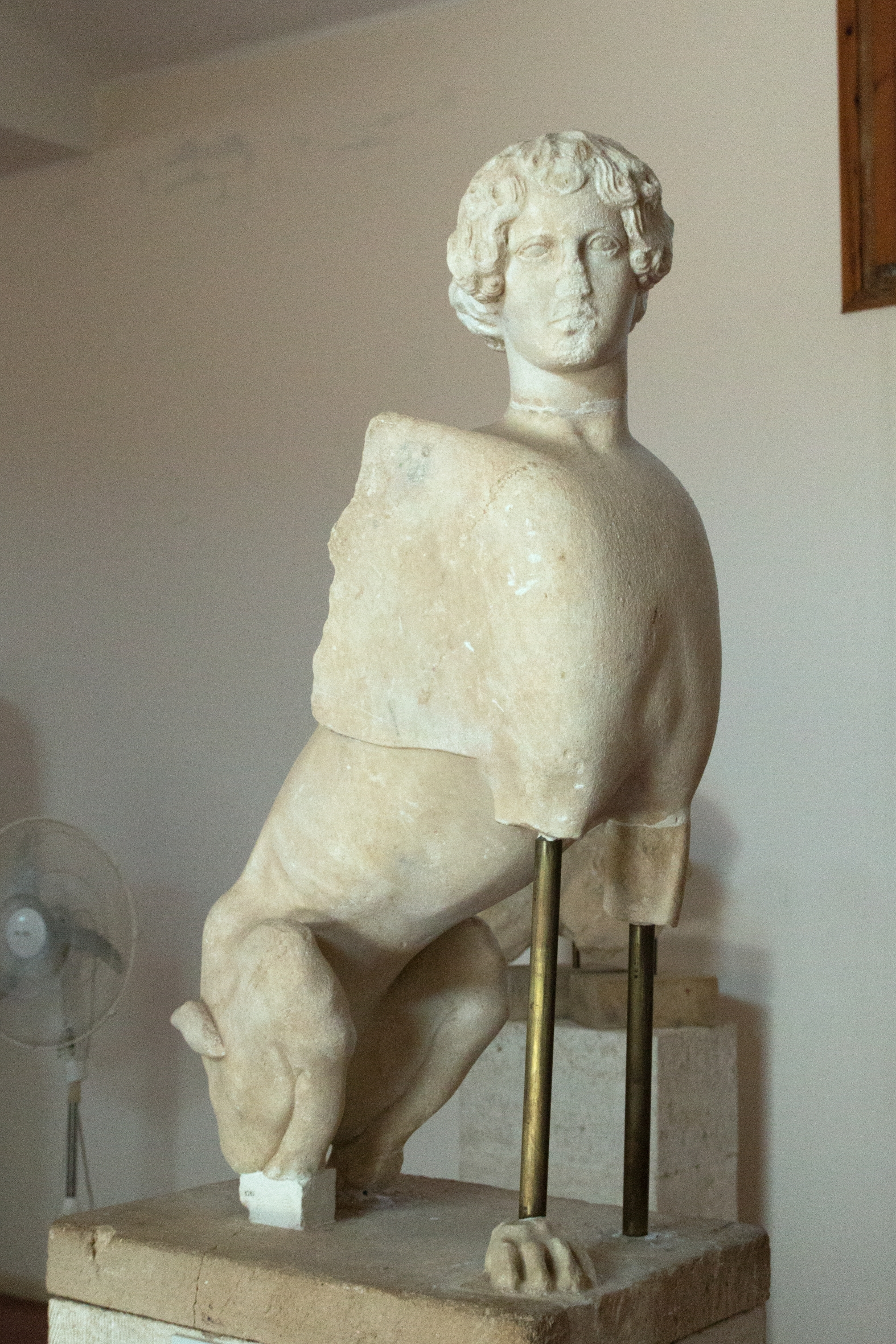
Early classical sphinx, from Temple of Apollo, c. 460 BC.
