= Etched carnelian beads =

Ancient decorative bead

Etched carnelian beads

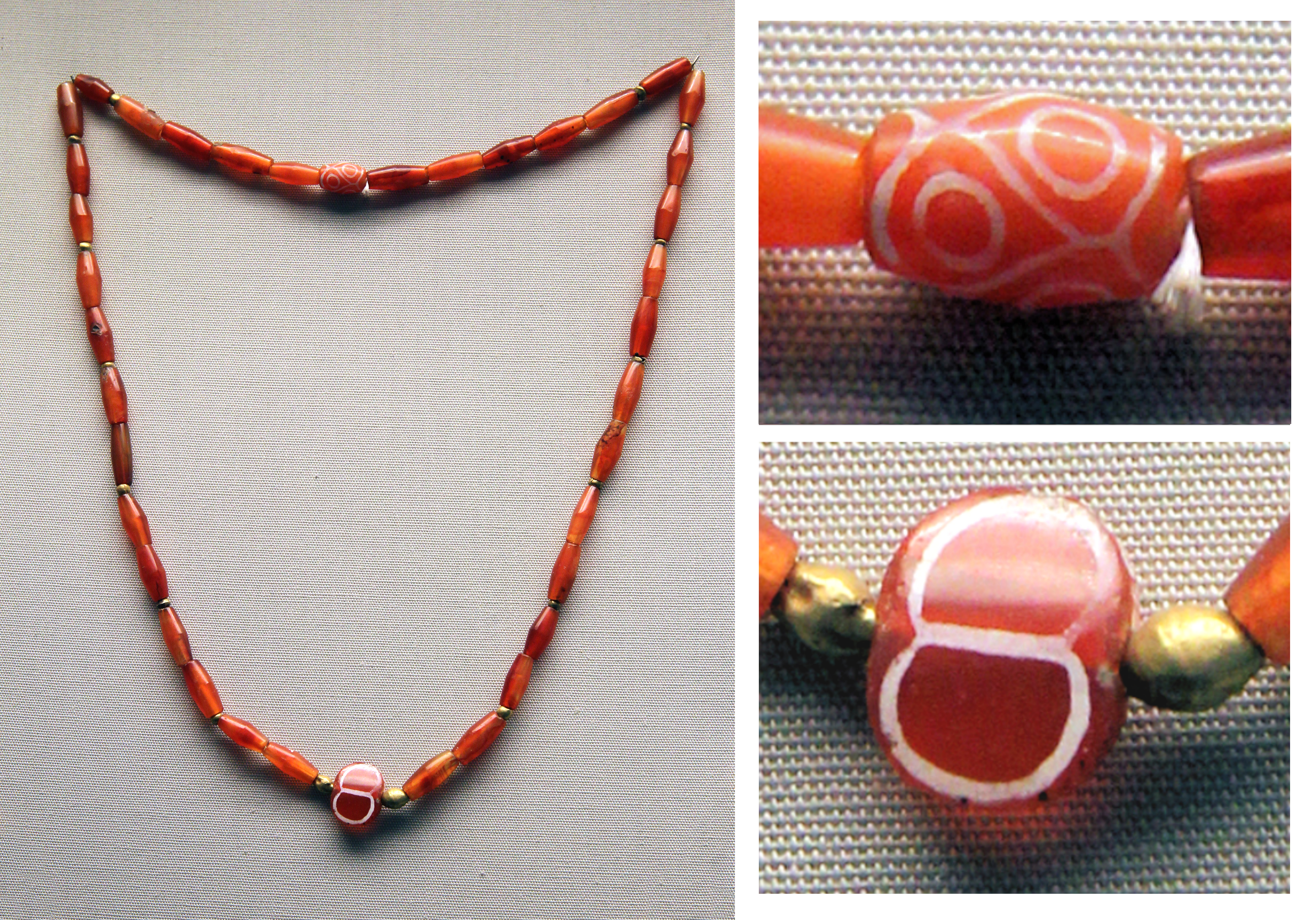
The etched carnelian beads in this necklace from the Royal Cemetery of Ur dating to the First Dynasty of Ur (2600-2500 BCE) were probably imported from the Indus Valley. British Museum.

Etched carnelian beads, or sometimes bleached carnelian beads, are a type of ancient decorative bead made from carnelian with an etched design in white, which were probably manufactured by the Indus Valley Civilization during the 3rd millennium BCE. They were made according to a technique of alkaline-etching developed by the Harappans, and vast quantities of these beads were found in the archaeological sites of the Indus Valley civilization. They are considered as an important marker of ancient trade between the Indus Valley, Mesopotamia, and Ancient Egypt, as these precious and unique manufactured items circulated in great numbers between these geographical areas during the 3rd millennium BCE, and have been found in numerous tomb deposits.

== Production technique ==
Indus Valley etched carnelian beads
(3rd millennium BCE)

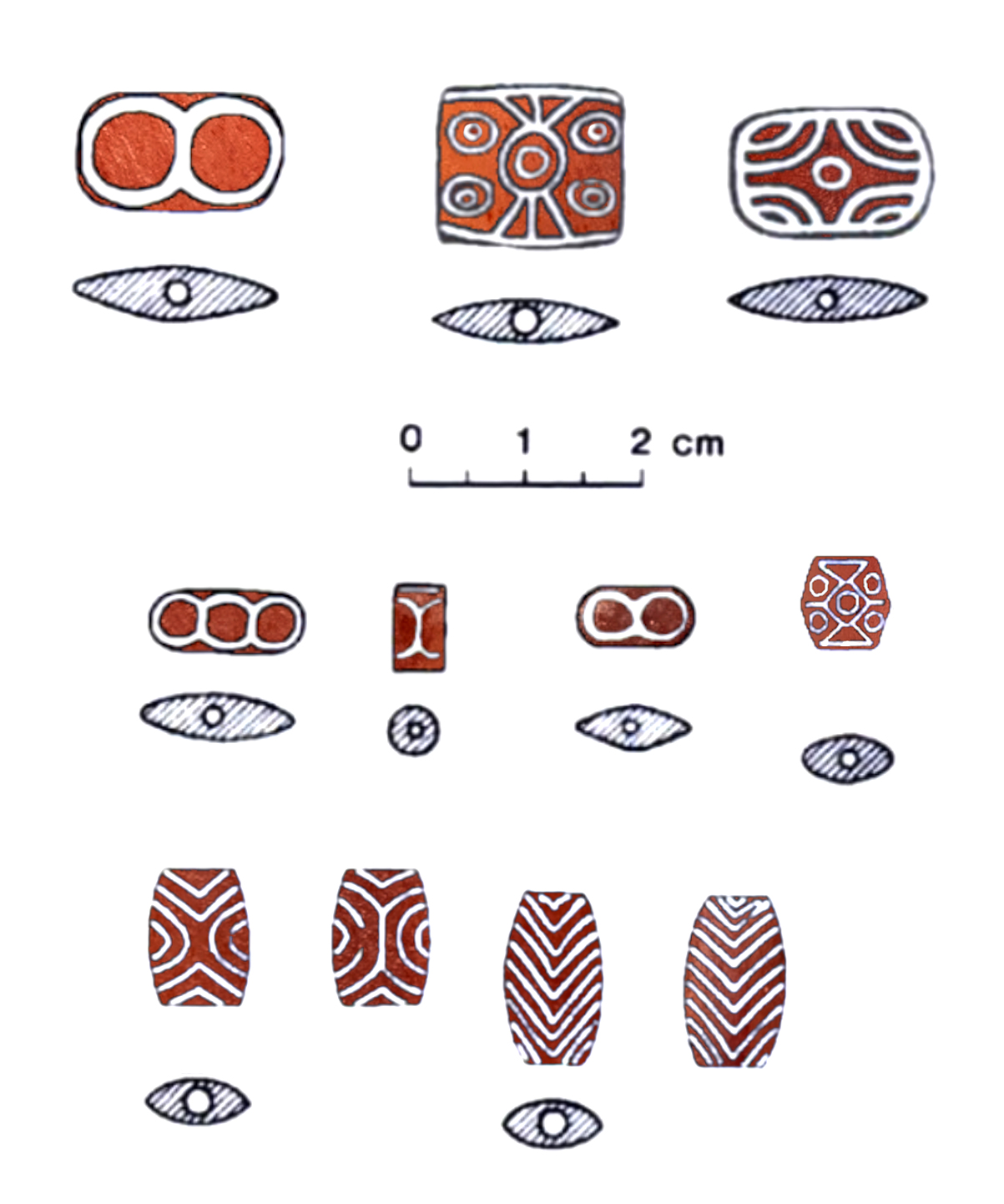
Decorated Carnelian Beads, Harappa Culture.

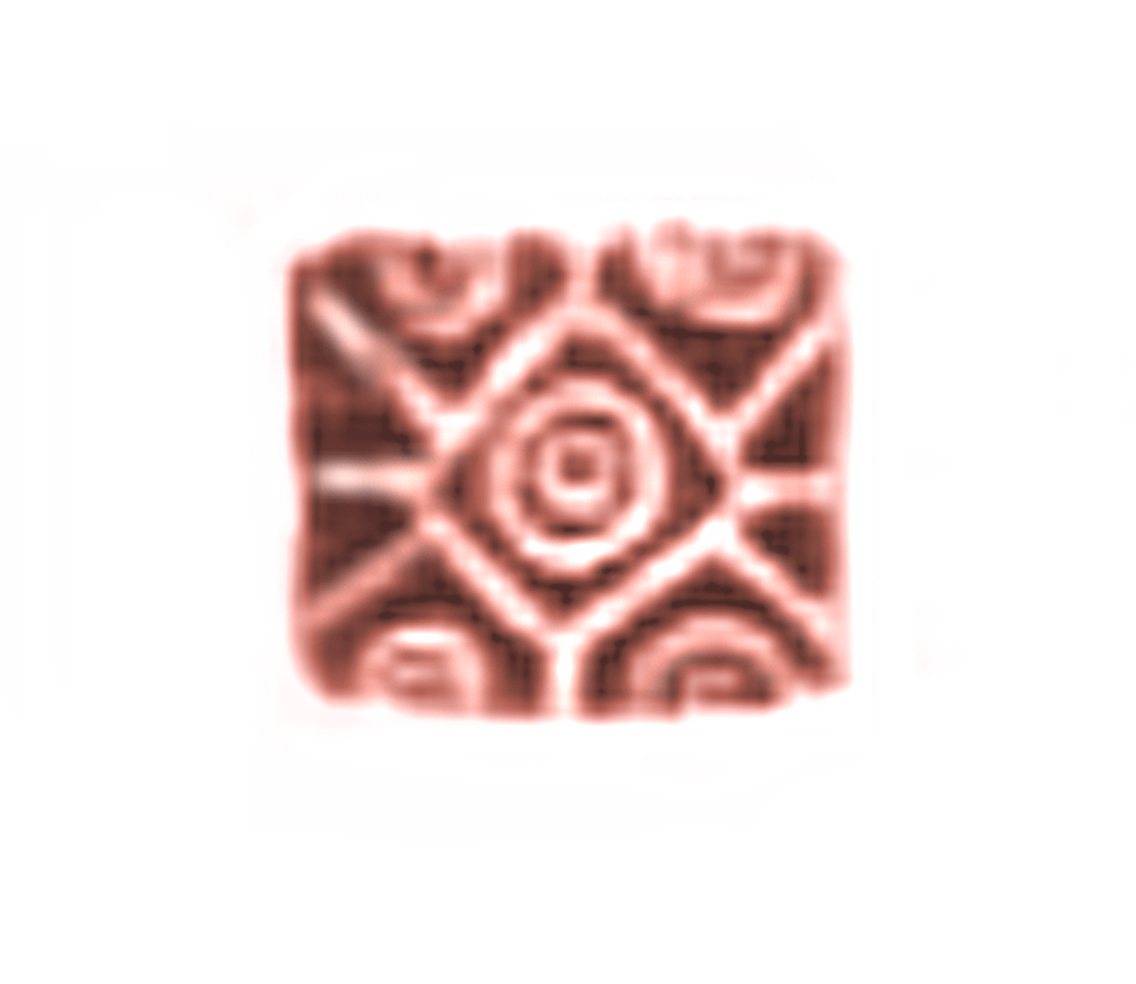
Indus valley civilization etched carnelian bead, Mohenjo-daro.

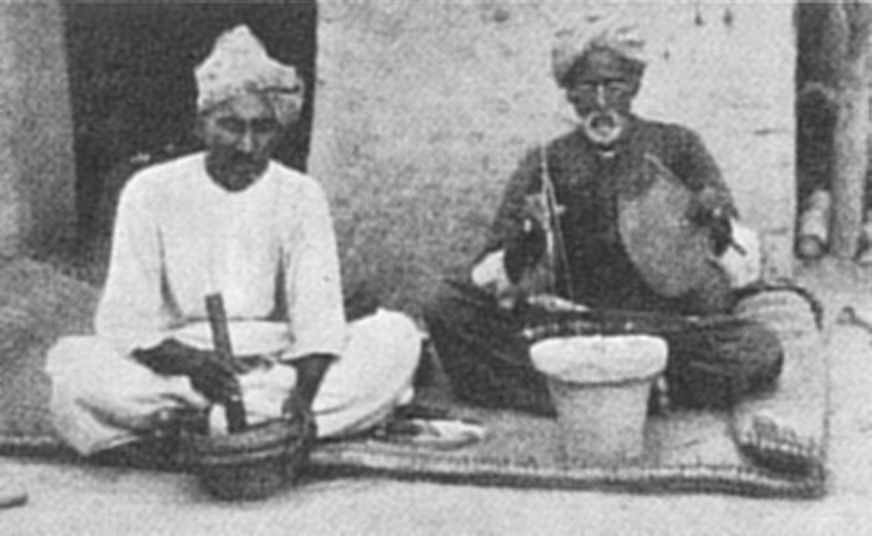
Making etched carnelian beads in modern times in Sehwan: one mixes the alkali formula in a mortar, while the other prepares a brasero (Mackay, 1933).

Etched carnelian beads with characteristic designs are widely known from various Indus Valley Civilization sites dating to the 3rd millennium BCE, such as at Dholavira, and these beads "were exported to the Mesopotamian region during second half of 3rd millennium BC and were of extreme importance".

The technique used in making etched carnelian beads has been the object of ethnographical studies, particularly by H.C. Beck. It is rather complex and relies on delicate craftsmanship, etching chemical reactions and proper firing. First, the bead has to be shaped and polished from its raw state and pierced in its center, in order to form a regular bead of the desired shape. This process alone can take three to eight days of work.

Then a chemical etching agent has to be formulated; this agent is typically a sticky paste formulated from an alkaline washing soda solution (sodium carbonate) and plant juice, most commonly Capparis aphylla, a bush growing in dry or arid areas in Africa, Iran, Pakistan, and India. Once mixed, the texture of the paste also has to be just right to allow for a good spread without bleeding, thus permitting the creation of a beautiful design. The paste, once applied, is left to dry, at which point it only forms a transparent varnish.

The bead with its design then has to be fired at the proper temperature: hot enough to permit the chemical etching of the carnelian stone, but not hot enough for the bead to fracture. The resulting design is white, usually with some surface calcinated residues which can be easily brushed away.

In 1933, Ernest Mackay studied the process as still being implemented in Sindh, which was summarized by Gregory Possehl in the following terms:

"The process began with the juice extracted from the tips of young shoots of a bush called 'kirar' in Sindhi (Capparis aphylla). The informant then ground washing soda to a fine powder and mixed it with water in a cup. He poured a small quantity of this on the kirar and rubbed the whole carefully together to a semfluid mass. Then the craftsman strained this mixture through a piece of linen into a large empty mussel shell, and the "paint" was ready. The paint was applied to a carnelian stone using a reed pen. The painted stone was then allowed to dry, first in the hand, then by placing it on a metal plate over a charcoal fire. When fully dry, the carnelian was covered with live coals and the fire fanned for about five minutes. The piece was then removed from the heat and allowed to cool slowly for about 10 minutes under an inverted cup, at which point the craftsman rubbed his piece of carnelian briskly with a rag and handed it over for inspection. It was perfect!"

— Gregory Possehl, The Indus Civilization: A Contemporary Perspective.

== Mesopotamia ==
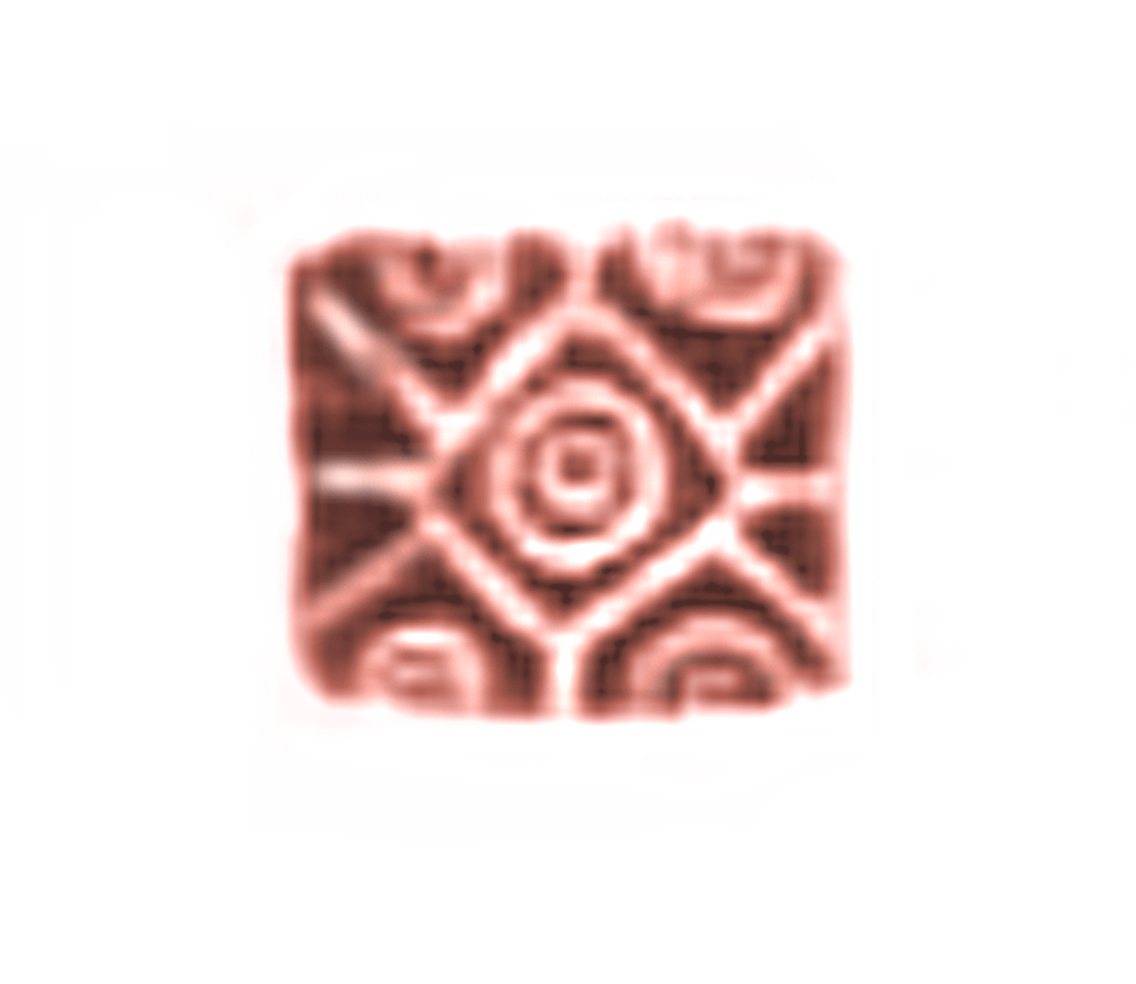
Indus valley Civilization etched carnelian bead, excavated in Mohenjo-daro.

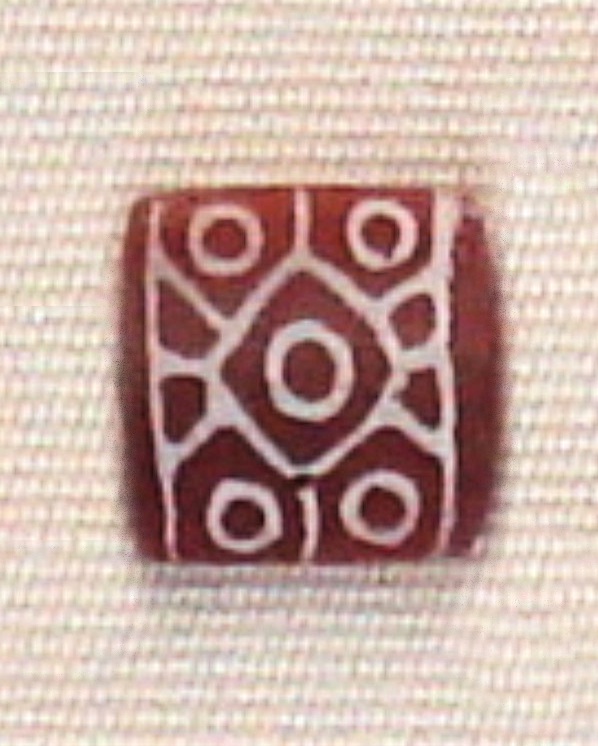
Etched carnelian bead, excavated in Susa, dated 2600-1700 BCE. Louvre Museum.

Etched carnelian beads from the Indus were found in the tombs of the Royal Cemetery of Ur, dating to 2600–2450 BCE. They are an important marker of Indus–Mesopotamia relations in ancient times. The Neo-Sumerian ruler Gudea (c. 2100 BCE), in his Gudea cylinders (cylinder B XIV), mentioned his procurement of "blocks of lapis lazuli and bright carnelian from Meluhha." Meluhha is generally identified with the Indus region, and there are no known mentions of Meluhha after 1760 BCE. It is thought that these carnelian beads were considered an important status symbol in Sumerian society.

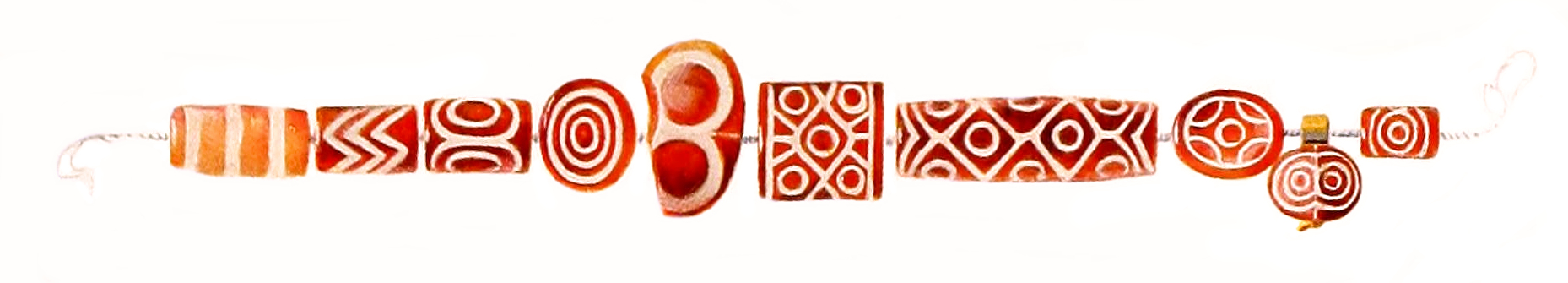
Etched carnelian beads excavated in tomb PG 1133 of the Royal Cemetery of Ur, 2600-2500 BCE.
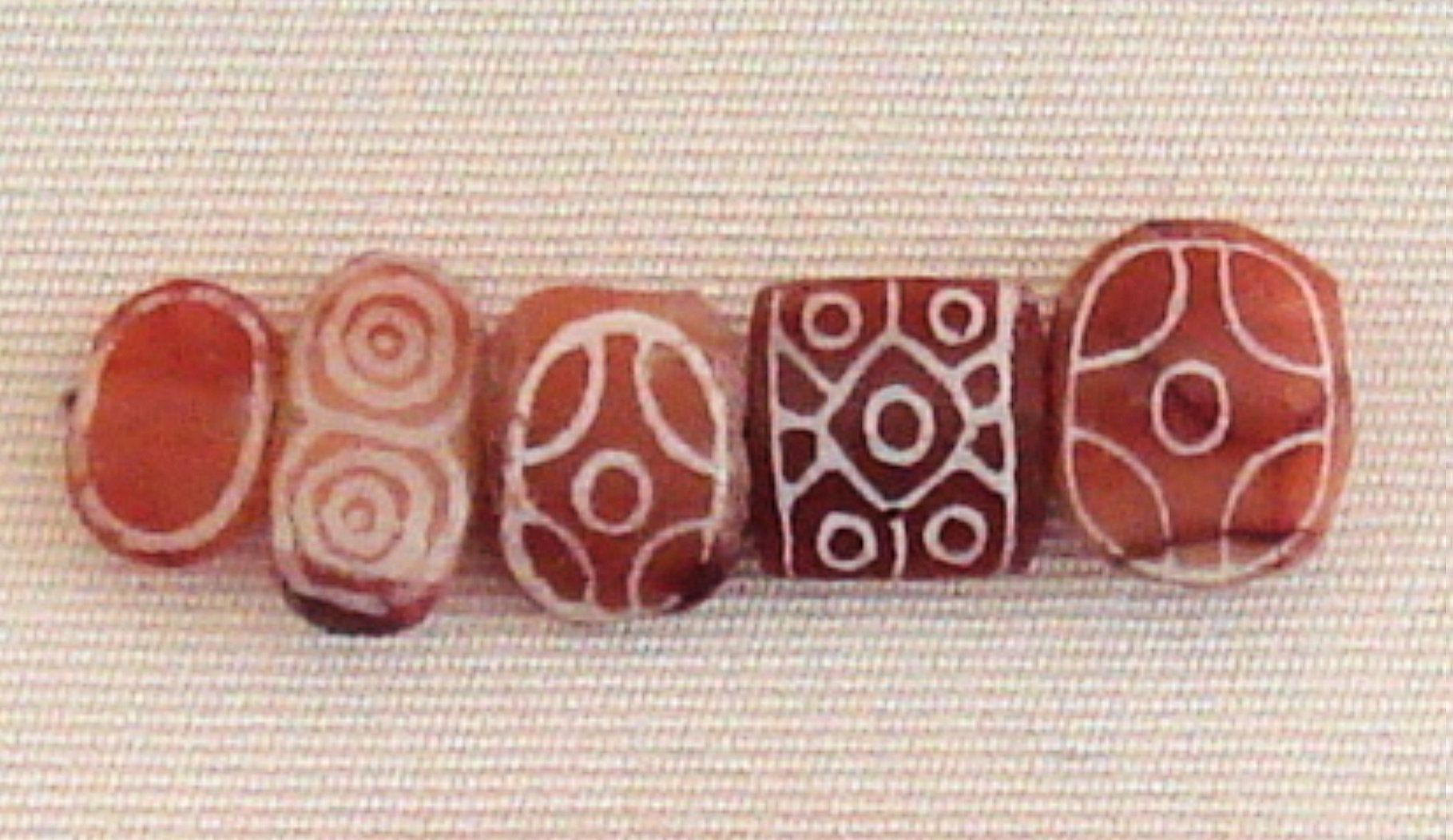
Pakistani etched carnelian beads, imported to Susa in 2600-1700 BCE. Found in the tell of the Susa acropolis. Louvre Museum. Identical with beads found in Dholavira.

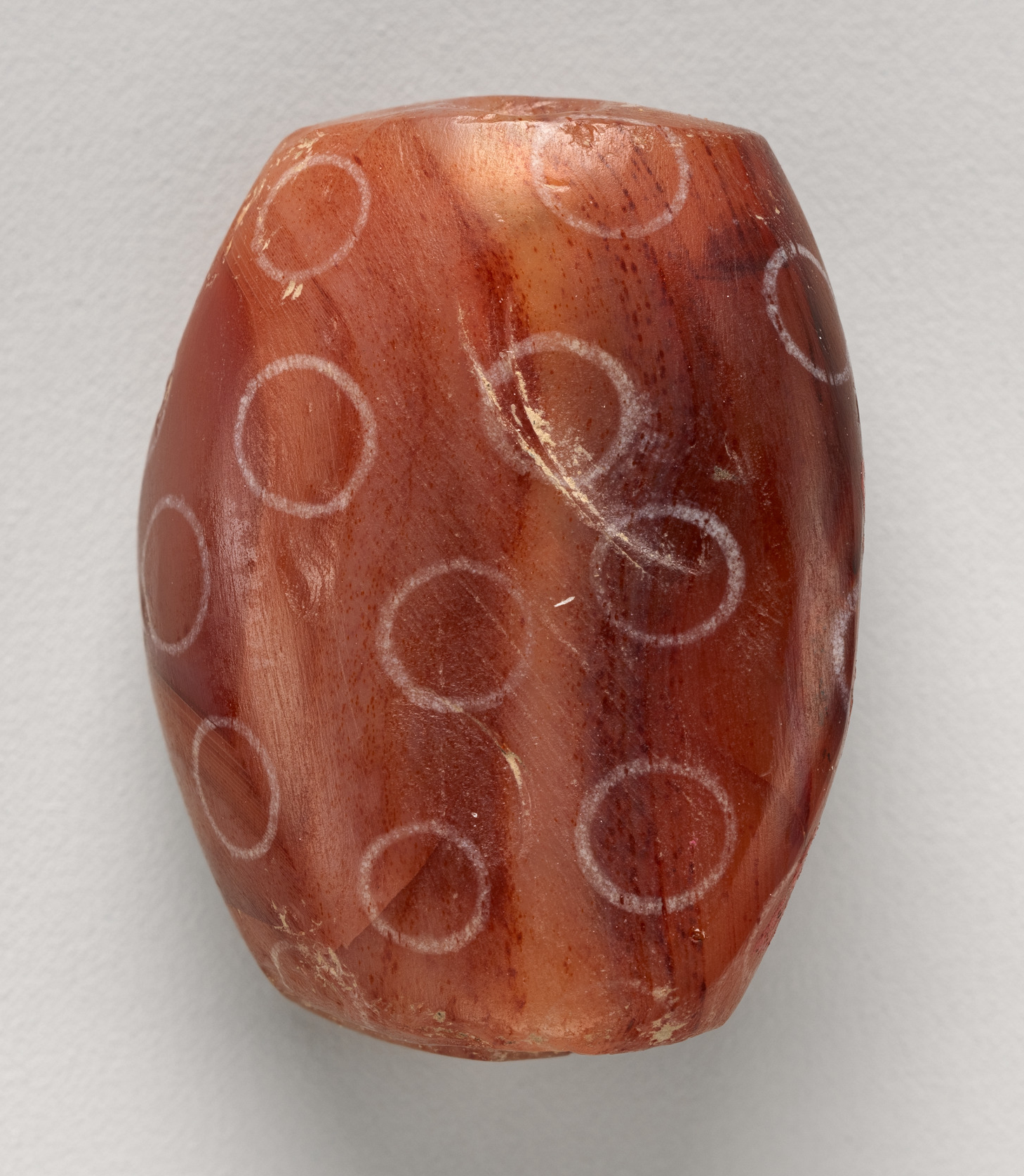
Indus Civilisation Carnelian bead with white design, c. 2900–2350 BC. Found in Nippur, Mesopotamia

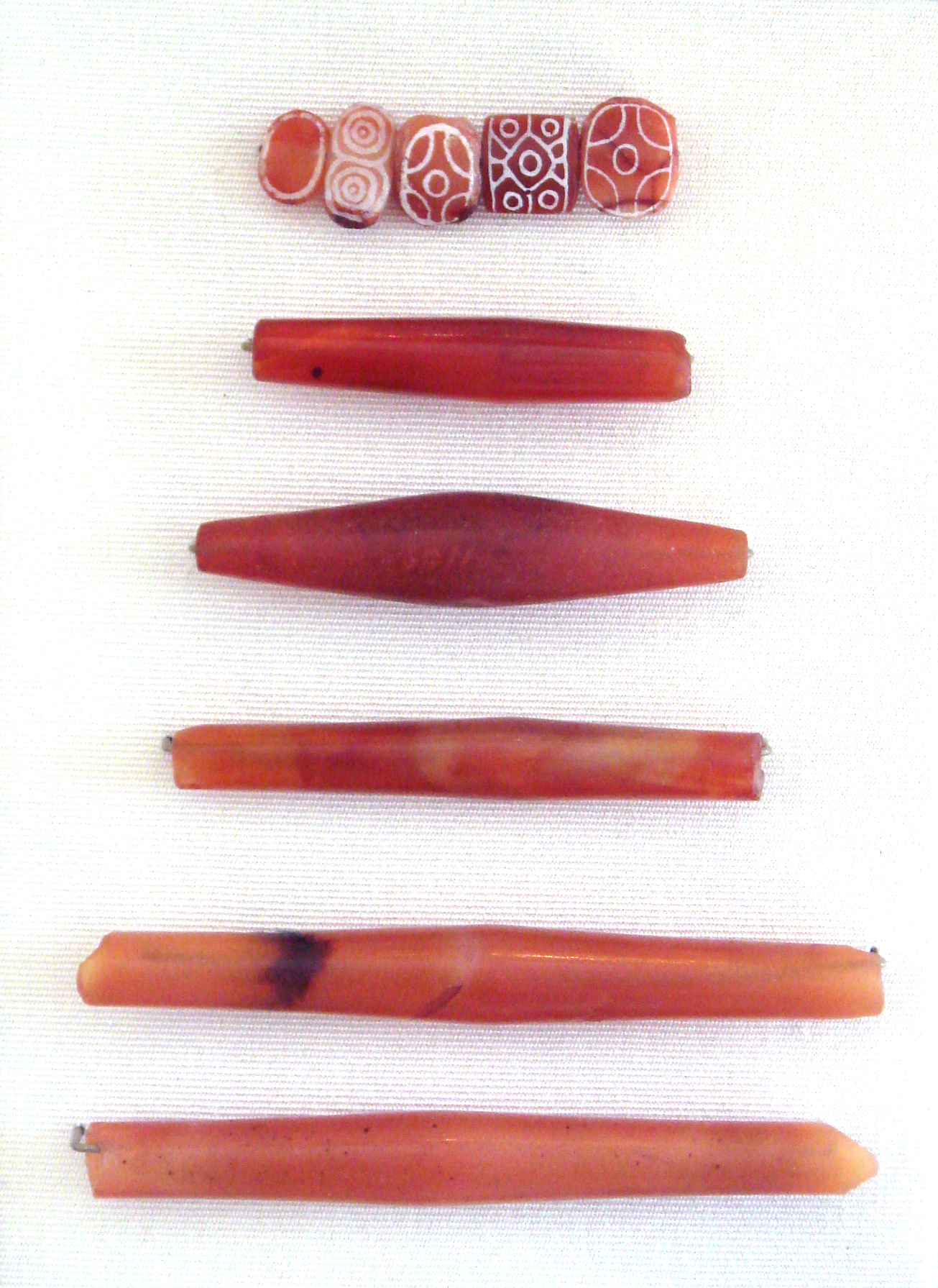
Indus Valley Civilization carnelian beads excavated in Susa. Louvre Museum

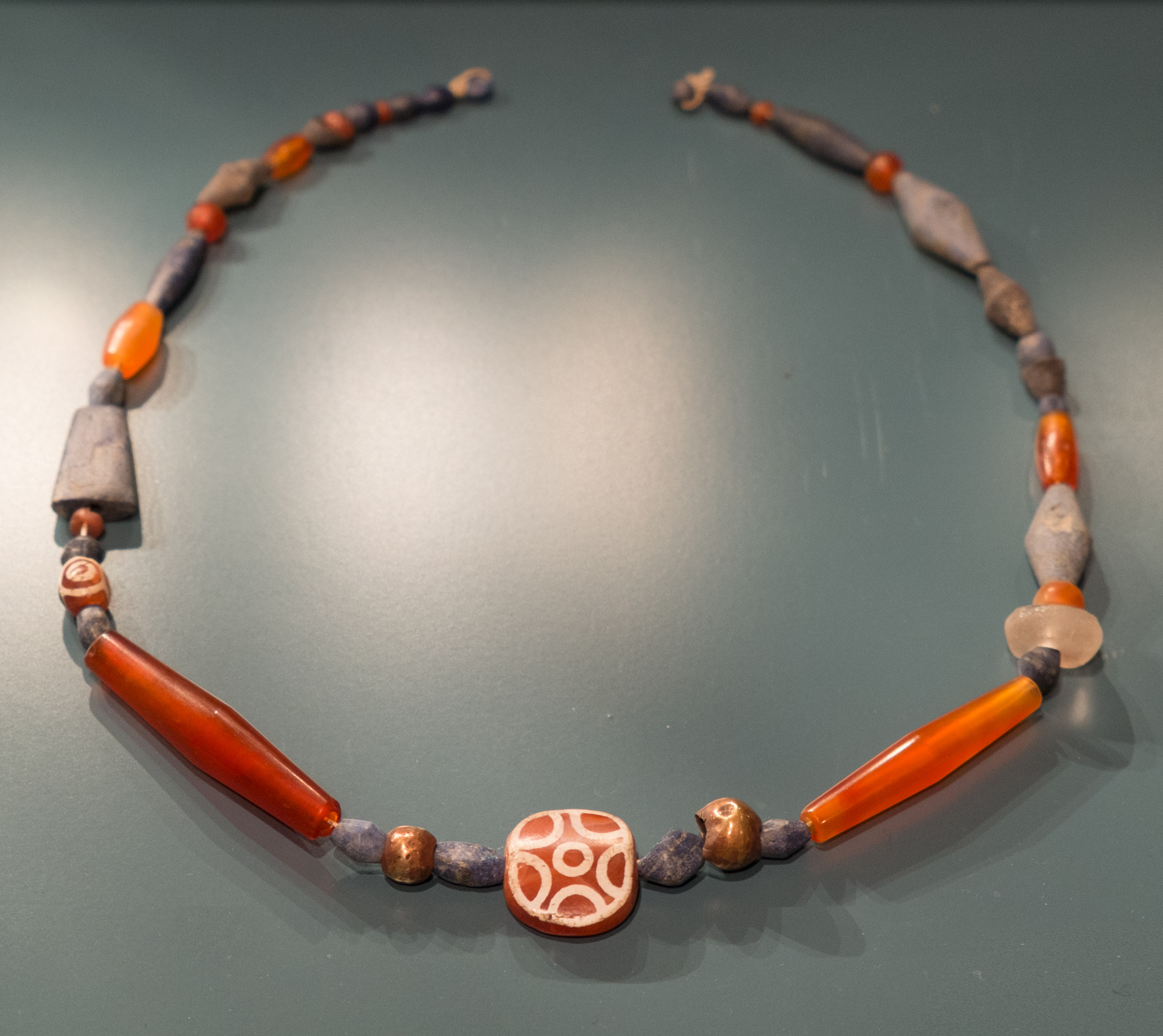
Necklace made of gold, lapis lazuli, carnelian and etched carnelian beads, c.2600-2340 from Kish in Sumer

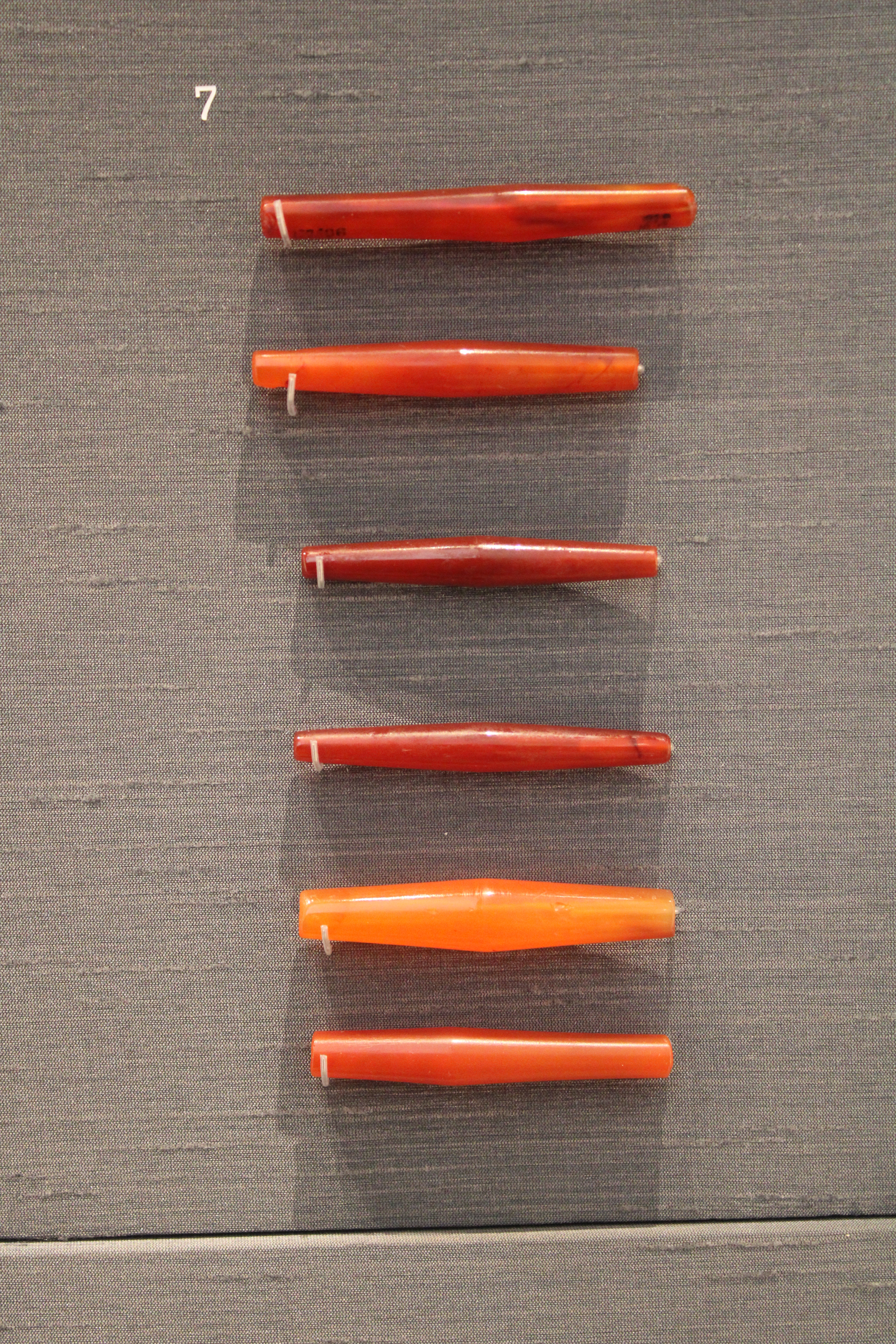
Harappan carnelian beads, excavated in the Royal Cemetery at Ur. British Museum

=== Local Mesopotamian creations (Akkadian and Ur III periods, circa 2100 BCE) ===
King Shulgi carnelian bead
(c. 2094–2047 BCE)

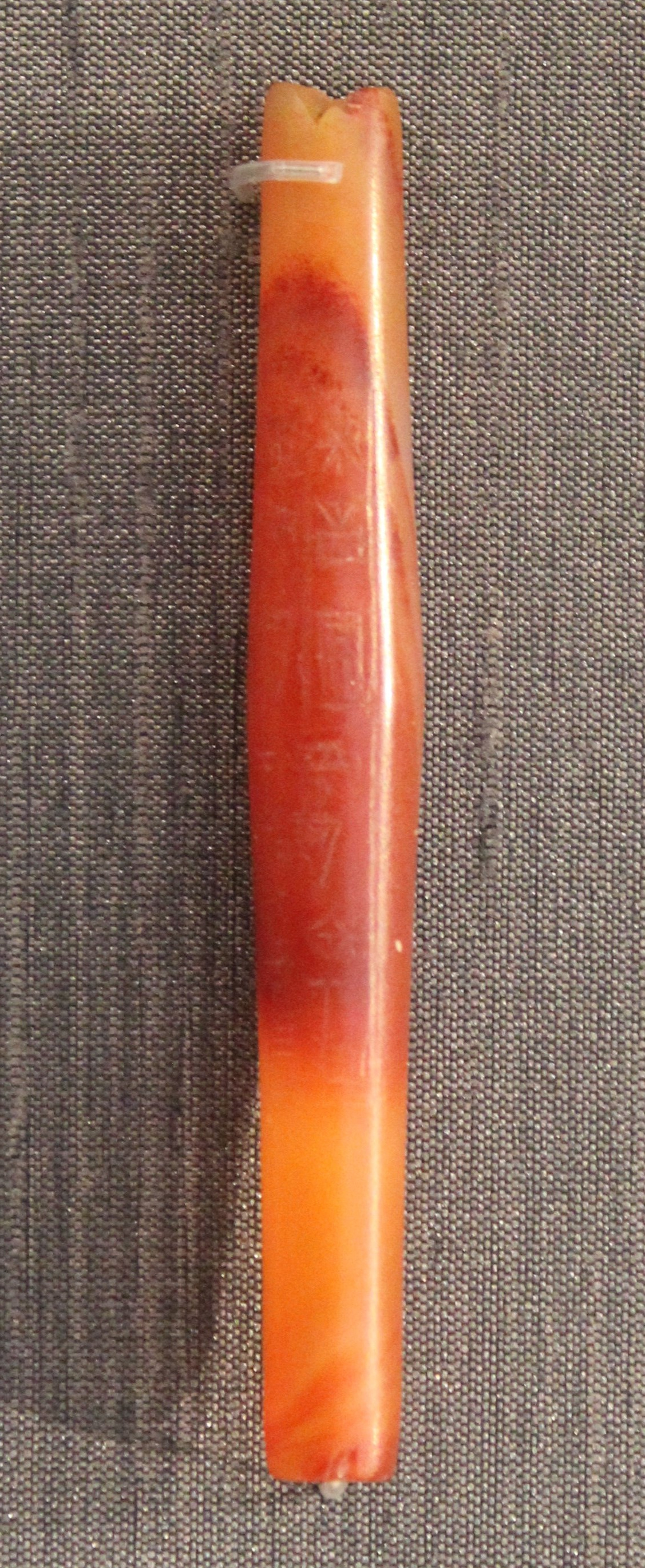
𒀭𒊩𒌆𒆤
𒎏𒀀𒉌
𒀭𒂄𒄀
𒍑𒆗𒂵
𒈗𒋀𒀊𒆠𒈠
𒈗𒆠𒂗
𒄀𒆠𒌵𒆤
𒉆𒋾𒆷𒉌𒂠
𒀀𒈬𒈾𒊒

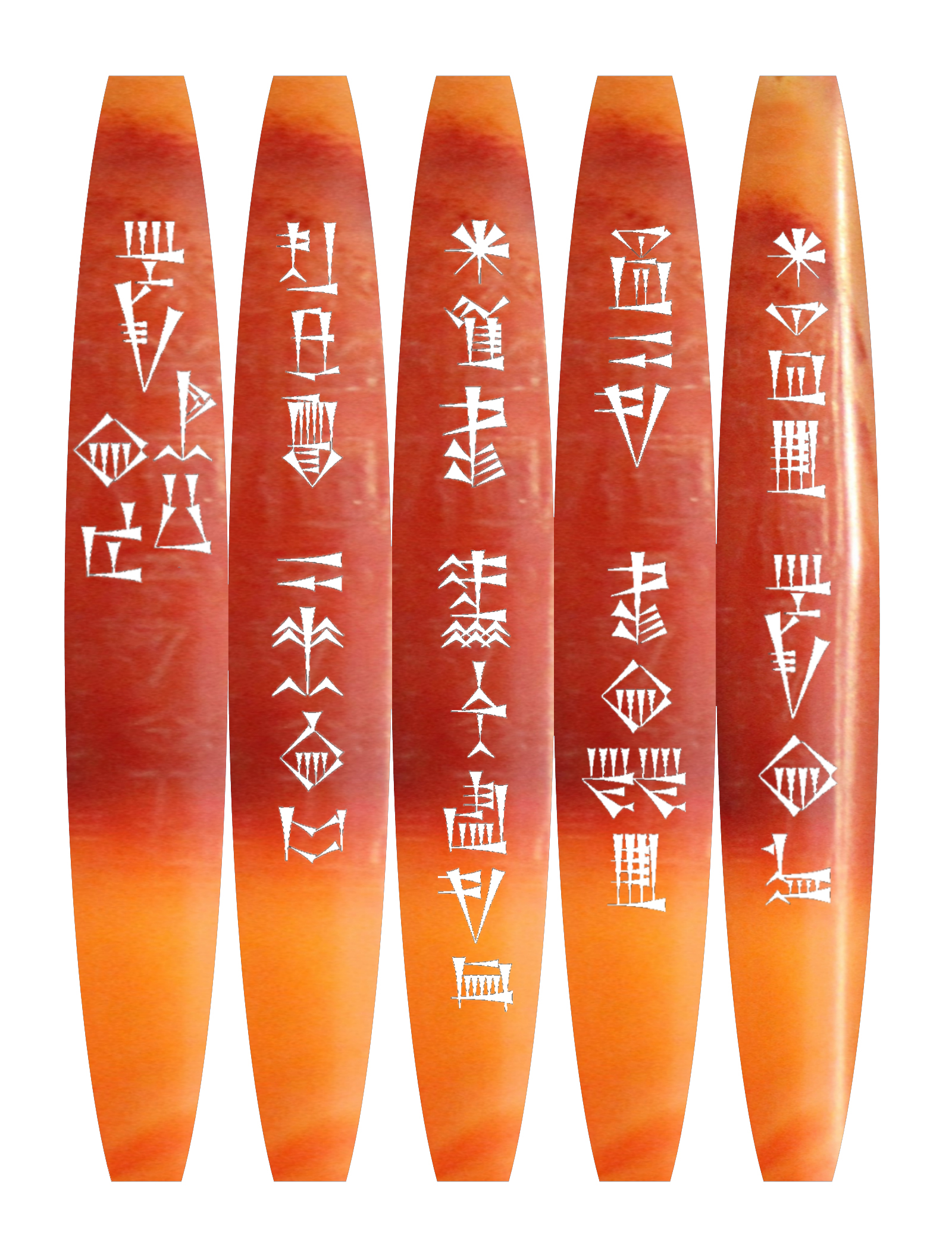
^{D}Ninlil.......................... "For Ninlil"
NIN-a-ni....................... "his Lady,"
^{D}SHUL-GI.................... "Shulgi"
NITAH KALAG ga........ "the mighty man"
LUGAL URIM KI ma..... "King of Ur"
LUGAL kien-................. "King of Sumer"
gi kiURIke..................... "and Akkad,"
nam-ti-la-ni-sze3........... "for his life"
a mu-na-ru................... "dedicated (this)"

Carnelian bead, elongated (7 cm), Harappan style, provenance unknown. Bearing a cuneiform commemorative inscription of Shulgi, dedicating the bead to the goddess Ninlil: "To Ninlil, his Lady, Shulgi, mighty man, king of Ur, king of the lands of Sumer and Akkad, dedicated (this bead) for his (own) life". British Museum, BM 129493 This type of carnelian bead was probably imported from India.

Some of these beads of probable Indus provenance were engraved by Sumerian kings for dedication purposes. Shulgi in particular is known for having engraved two carnelian beads with dedication to his gods.

One of them was found in Susa by Jacques de Morgan and is now in the Louvre Museum. Its inscription reads: "Ningal, his mother, Shulgi, god of his land, King of Ur, King of the four world quarters, for his life dedicated (this)" (Louvre Museum, Sb 6627). It is considered that this bead belongs to the smaller type of the "classically Harappean" beads, and was initially imported from the Indus Valley, and then engraved by Shulgi.

The other carnelian bead is in the British Museum, its inscription reads: "To Ninlil, his Lady, Shulgi, mighty man, king of Ur, king of the lands of Sumer and Akkad, dedicated (this bead) for his (own) life" (British Museum, BM 129493).

These two examples show that there was a level of Mesopotamian adaptation, and appropriation of the etching technology in using or decorating carnelian beads, since there are no known beads with textual inscriptions among the carnelian beads excavated in the Indus region. In Mesopotamia, the tradition of inscribing beads of precious stones with religious dedications was an ancient one, as a lapis lazuli bead belonging to king Mesannepada and dating to c. 2550 BCE is also known. Such dedication beads were created much later too, such as the agate bead dedicated by Sargon II for Damkina in the 8th century BCE.

Some of the designs on the etched carnelian beads found in Mesopotamia are also typically Mesopotamian, and have no equivalent in the Indus region, such as stepped patterns, guilloché designs, or a Mesopotamian sun symbol in one case. This again suggests the existence of Mesopotamian workshops dedicated to the creation of some local designs of etched carnelian beads, with the carnelian material itself most probably coming from the Indus region.

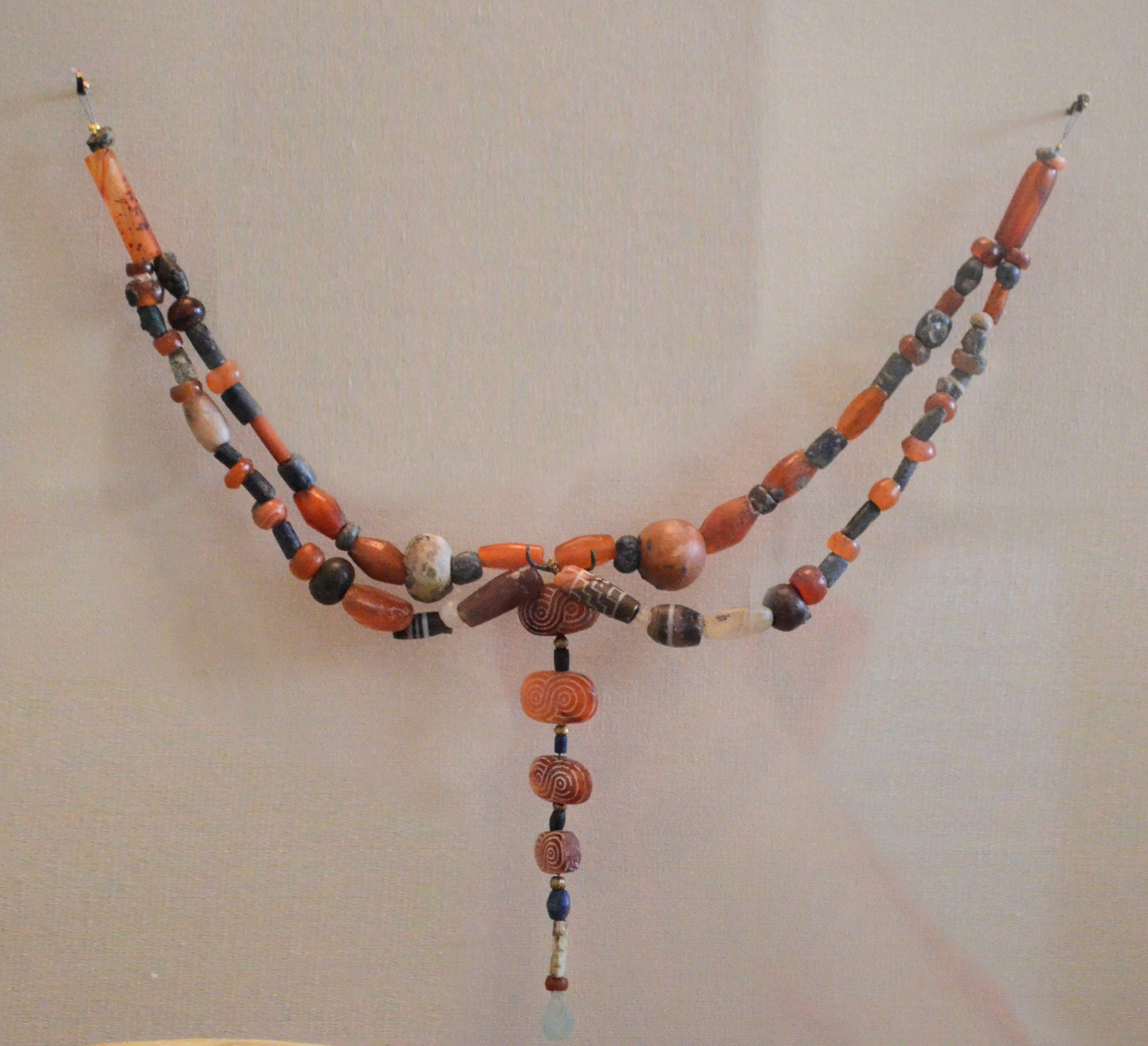
Jewelry with components from the Indus, Central Asia and Northern-eastern Iran found in Susa, Akkadian Empire or Ur III period. Louvre Museum

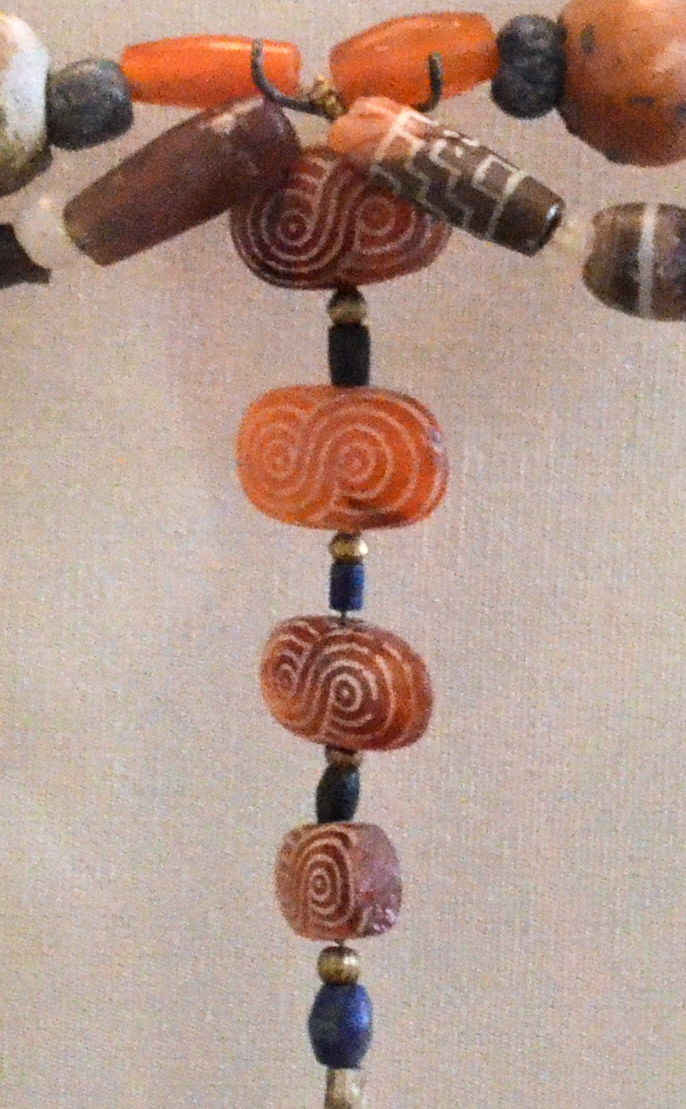
Four oval-shaped carnelian beads with guilloché pattern and one cylindrical bead with stepped pattern (top right) found in Susa excavations, Akkadian Empire or Ur III period. The carnelian is most probably from the Indus region, but the designs are typically Near-Eastern.

== Egypt ==
A few etched carnelian beads have also been found in ancient Egypt, thought to have been imported from the Indus Valley Civilization through Mesopotamia, this time as part of Egypt-Mesopotamia relations. Examples are known dating to the late Middle Kingdom c. 1800 BCE. London, Petrie Museum of Egyptian Archaeology, ref. UC30334.

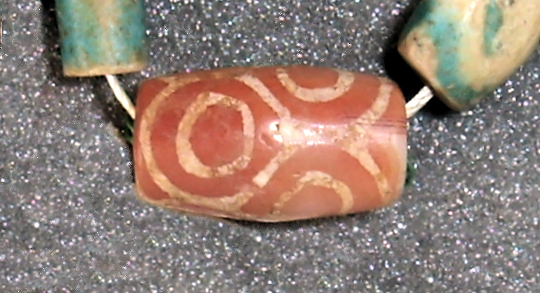
A rare etched carnelian bead found in Egypt, thought to have been imported from the Indus Valley Civilization through Mesopotamia. Late Middle Kingdom. London, Petrie Museum of Egyptian Archaeology, ref. UC30334.

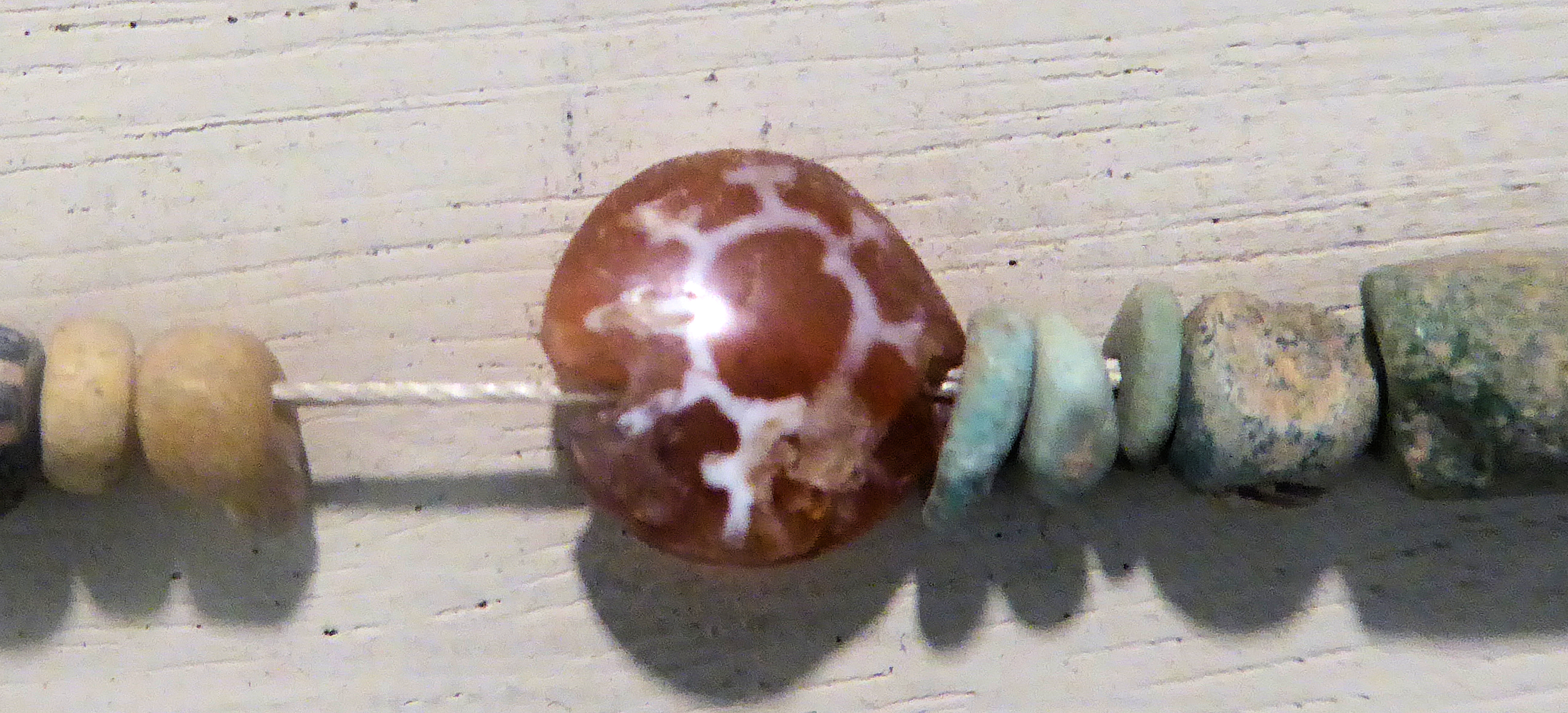
Etched carnelian bead, Egypt Ptolemaic Period, London, Petrie Museum of Egyptian Archaeology UC51264 (detail)

== Greece ==
Some rare examples of etched carnelian beads have been found in archaeological excavations in ancient Greece, pointing to ancient trade relations with Mesopotamia and the Indus Valley Civilization. One such object is visible in the Archaeological Museum of Aegina, the westernmost known occurrence of this type of object.

== Central South East and East Asia ==
=== China ===
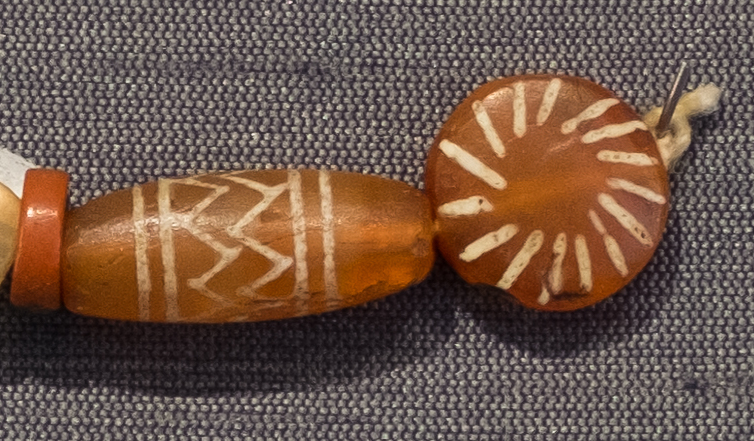
Indus Valley etched carnelian bead, Nilgiri culture, 1st millennium BCE

Etched Carnelian beads of Indus valley origin have been excavated from various archaeological sites in China dating from the Western Zhou and Spring and Autumn periods (early half of 1st millennium BCE) to Han and Jin dynasties. About 55 such specimens have been found, mostly from southern (Yunnan and Guangdong) and northwestern China (Xinjiang), in burial remains. They are red in color with white motifs, and were manufactured with drilling techniques only known in the Indus Valley Civilization. They are considered to be imported goods, and indicate early cultural exchanges.

=== Tajikistan and Siberia ===
Etched carnelian beads have been found from female Saka burials dated 8th-6th century BCE in Pamir, Tajikistan, all likely imported from the Indus Valley. Etched carnelian beads, probably manufactured in Iran or Central Asia where found in the tomb of Saka tomb of Arzhan-2, suggesting trade exchanges with the south.

=== South East Asia ===
Etched carnelian beads have been noted in Thailand (4th century BCE-4th century AD), Vietnam (3rd-2nd century BCE, Sa Huỳnh, Óc Eo cultures), Philippines (Manunggul cave, 9th-2nd century BCE), Indonesia, Malaysia (Kuala Selinsing, Perak, 200 BCE or possibly much older), Myanmar (site near Mandalay, 8th–5th century BCE).

== See also ==
- Dzi bead
