= Cuneiform =

Writing system of the ancient Near East

- A trilingual cuneiform inscription of Xerxes I at Van Fortress in Turkey, an Achaemenid royal inscription written in Old Persian, Elamite and Babylonian forms of cuneiform
- Script type: Logographic and syllabary
- Period: c. 2900 BC – c. 100 AD
- Direction: Left-to-right
- Region: Sumer
- Languages: Sumerian, Akkadian, Amorite, Eblaite, Elamite, Hittite, Hurrian, Kalašma, Kaskian (possibly), Luwian, Urartian, Palaic, Ugaritic, Old Persian

Related scripts
- Parent systems: Proto-cuneiform (Proto-writing): Cuneiform
- Child systems: None; influenced the shape of Ugaritic and Old Persian glyphs

ISO 15924
- ISO 15924: Xsux (020), Cuneiform, Sumero-Akkadian

Unicode
- Unicode alias: Cuneiform
- Unicode range: U+12000 to U+123FF Cuneiform; U+12400 to U+1247F Cuneiform Numbers and Punctuation; U+12480 to U+1254F Early Dynastic Cuneiform; U+12550 to U+1268F Archaic Cuneiform Numerals

Cuneiform (Note: /kjuːˈniː.ɪfɔːrm/ kew-NEE-ih-form, /kjuːˈneɪ.ɪfɔːrm/ kew-NAY-ih-form, or /ˈkjuːnɪfɔːrm/ KEW-nih-form) is a logo-syllabic writing system that was used to write several languages of the ancient Near East. The script was in active use from the early Bronze Age until the 1st century BC. Cuneiform scripts are marked by and named for the characteristic wedge-shaped impressions (Latin: cuneus) which form their signs. Cuneiform is the earliest known writing system and was originally developed to write the Sumerian language of southern Mesopotamia (modern Iraq).

Over the course of its history, cuneiform was adapted to write a number of languages in addition to Sumerian. Akkadian texts are attested from the 24th century BC onward and make up the bulk of the cuneiform record. Akkadian cuneiform was itself adapted to write the Hittite language in the early 2nd millennium BC. The other languages with significant cuneiform corpora are Eblaite, Elamite, Hurrian, Luwian, and Urartian. The Old Persian alphabet features cuneiform-style signs. Cuneiform was rediscovered in modern times in the early 17th century with the publication of the trilingual Achaemenid royal inscriptions at Persepolis; these were first deciphered in the early 19th century. The modern study of cuneiform belongs to the ambiguously named field of Assyriology, as the earliest excavations of cuneiform libraries during the mid-19th century were in the area of ancient Assyria. An estimated half a million tablets are held in museums across the world, but comparatively few of these are published. The largest collections belong to the British Museum (approximately 130,000 tablets), the Vorderasiatisches Museum Berlin, the Louvre, the Istanbul Archaeology Museums, the National Museum of Iraq, the Yale Babylonian Collection (approximately 40,000 tablets), and the Penn Museum.

== History ==
Accounting tokens

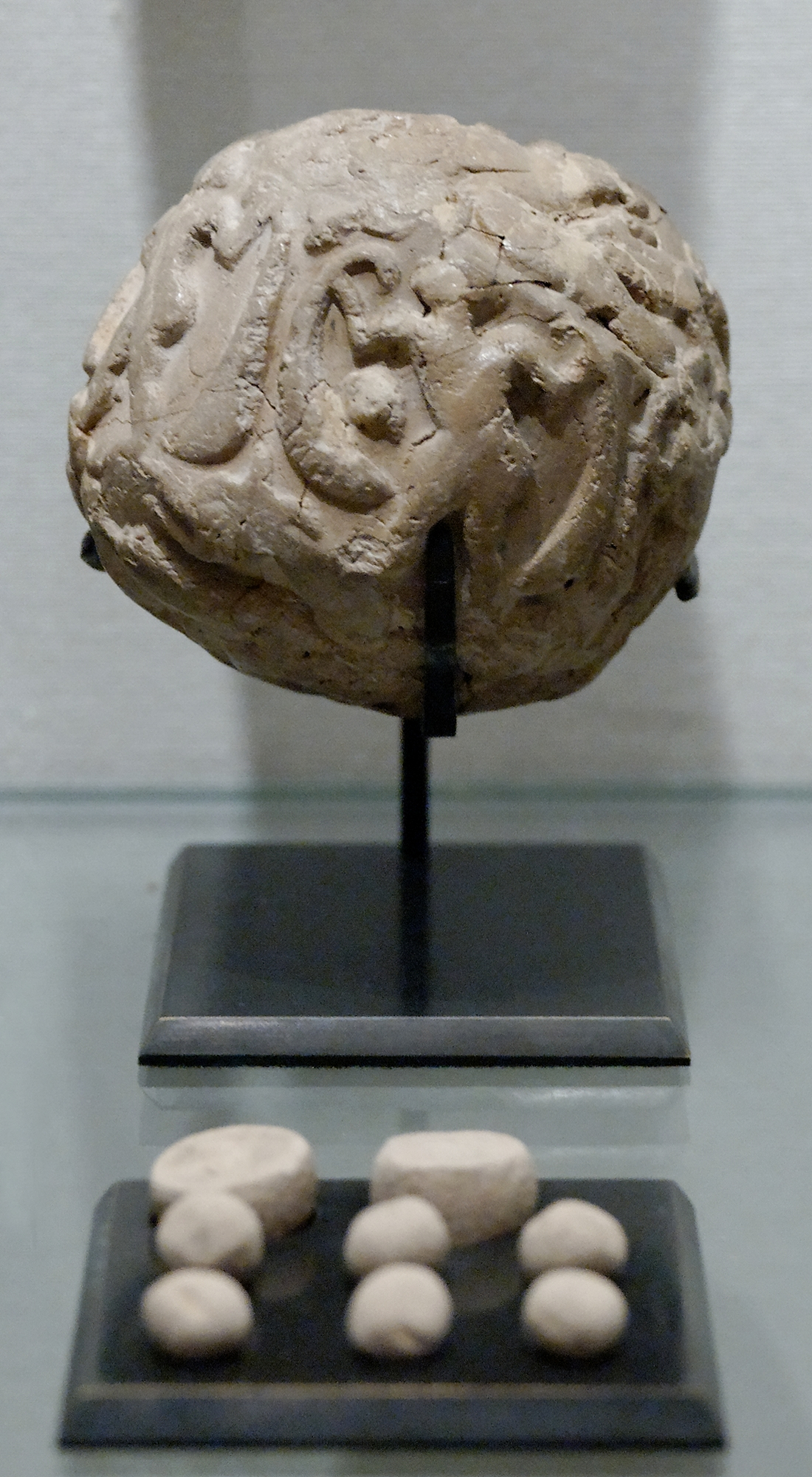
Clay bulla and tokens, 4000–3100 BC, Susa

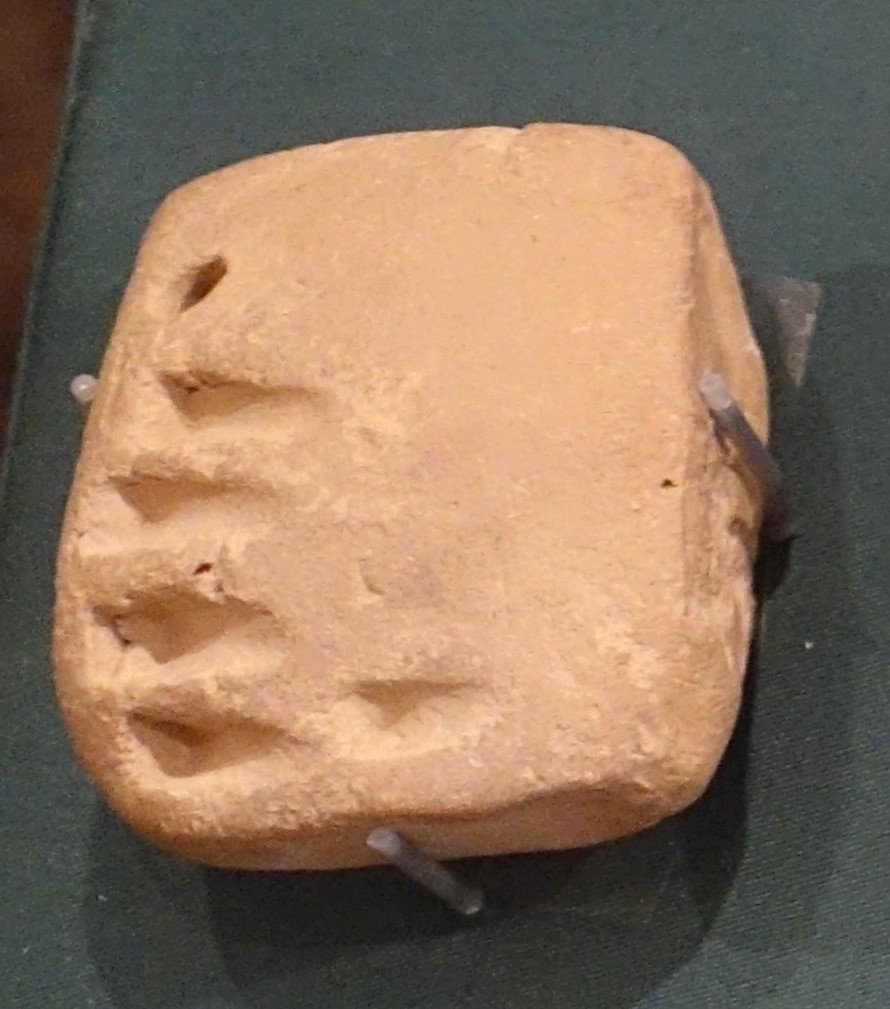
Numerical tablet, 3500–3350 BC (Uruk V phase), Khafajah

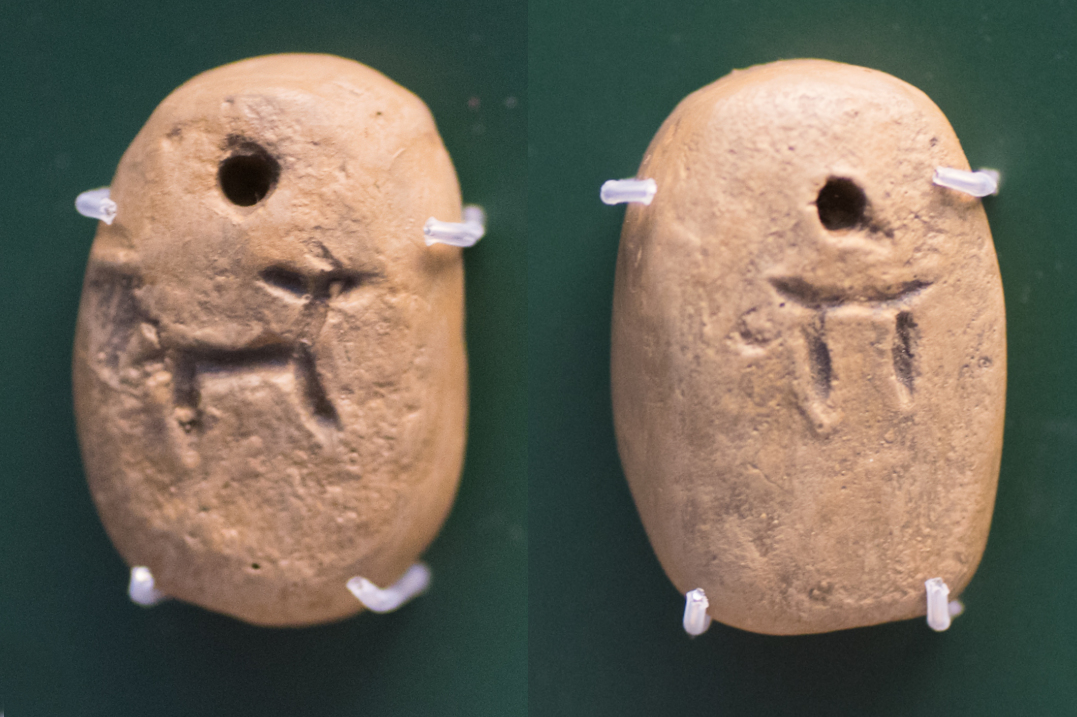
Pre-cuneiform tags, with drawing of goat or sheep and number (probably "10"), Al-Hasakah, 3300–3100 BC, Uruk culture

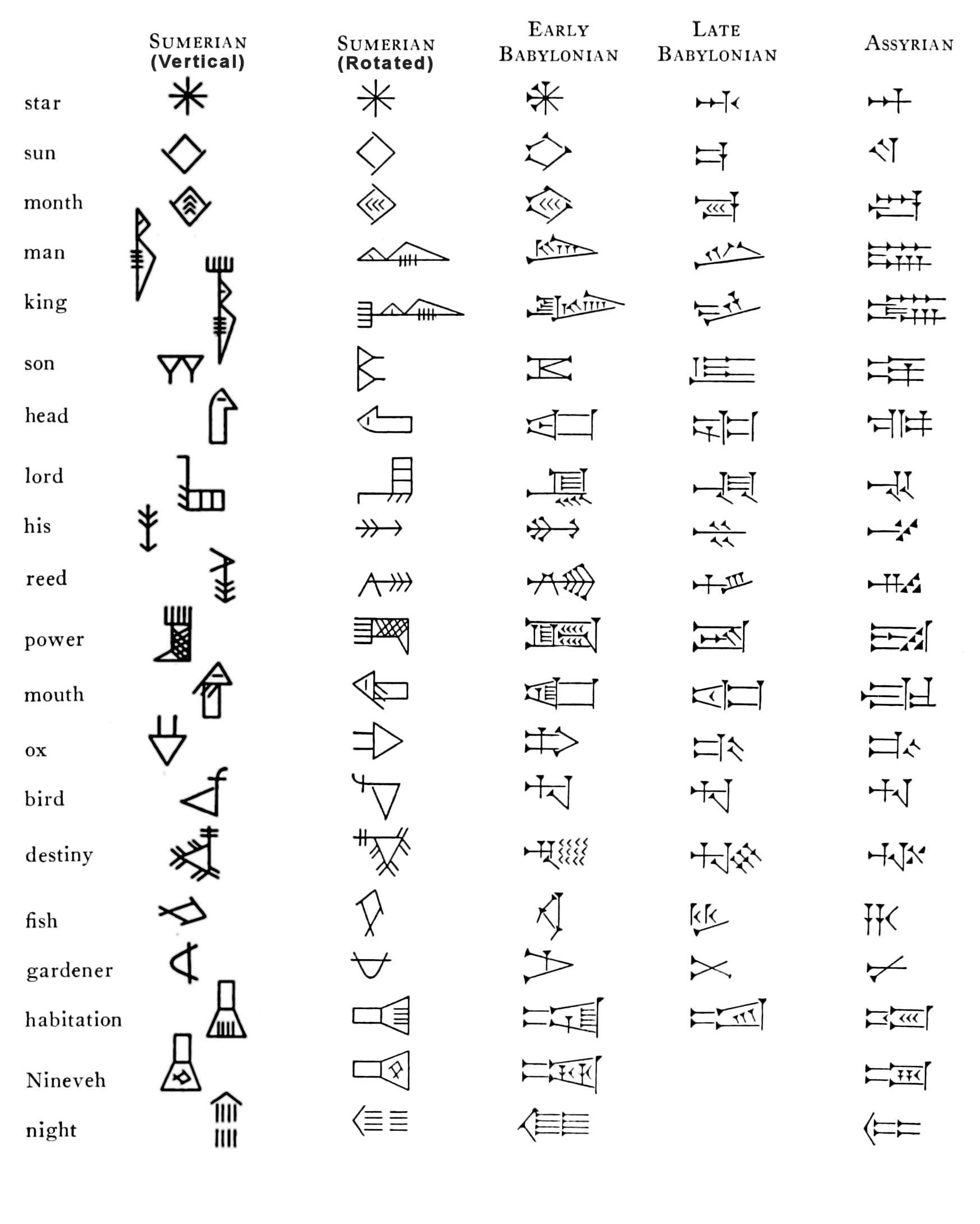
A table illustrating the progressive simplification of cuneiform signs from archaic (vertical) script to Assyrian

Writing began after pottery was invented, during the Neolithic when clay tokens were used to record specific amounts of livestock or commodities. These tokens were initially impressed on the surface of round clay envelopes (clay bullae) and then stored in them. The tokens were then progressively replaced by flat tablets, on which signs were recorded with a stylus. Writing is first recorded in Uruk, at the end of the 4th millennium BC, and soon after in various parts of the Near-East.

An ancient Mesopotamian poem gives the first known story of the invention of writing:

Because the messenger's mouth was heavy and he couldn't repeat [the message], the Lord of Kulaba patted some clay and put words on it, like a tablet. Until then, there had been no putting words on clay.

— Enmerkar and the Lord of Aratta, c. 1800 BC

The cuneiform writing system was in use for more than three millennia, through several stages of development, from the 31st century BC down to the second century AD. The latest firmly dateable tablet, from Uruk, dates to 79/80 AD. Ultimately, it was completely replaced by alphabetic writing, in the general sense, in the course of the Roman era, and there are no cuneiform systems in current use. It had to be deciphered as a completely unknown writing system in 19th-century Assyriology. It was successfully deciphered by 1857.

The cuneiform script changed considerably over more than 2,000 years. The image below shows the development of the sign SAĜ "head" (Borger nr. 184, U+12295 𒊕).

Evolution of the cuneiform sign SAG "head", 3000–1000 BC

Stages:

1. shows the pictogram as it was drawn around 3000 BC
2. shows the rotated pictogram as written from c. 2800–2600 BC
3. shows the abstracted glyph in archaic monumental inscriptions, from c. 2600 BC
4. is the sign as written in clay, contemporary with stage 3
5. represents the late 3rd millennium BC
6. represents Old Assyrian ductus of the early 2nd millennium BC, as adopted into Hittite
7. is the simplified sign as written by Assyrian scribes in the early 1st millennium BC and until the script's extinction.

A contrarian view has arisen on the tokens being the precursor of writing.

=== Proto-cuneiform (c. 3300 BC) ===
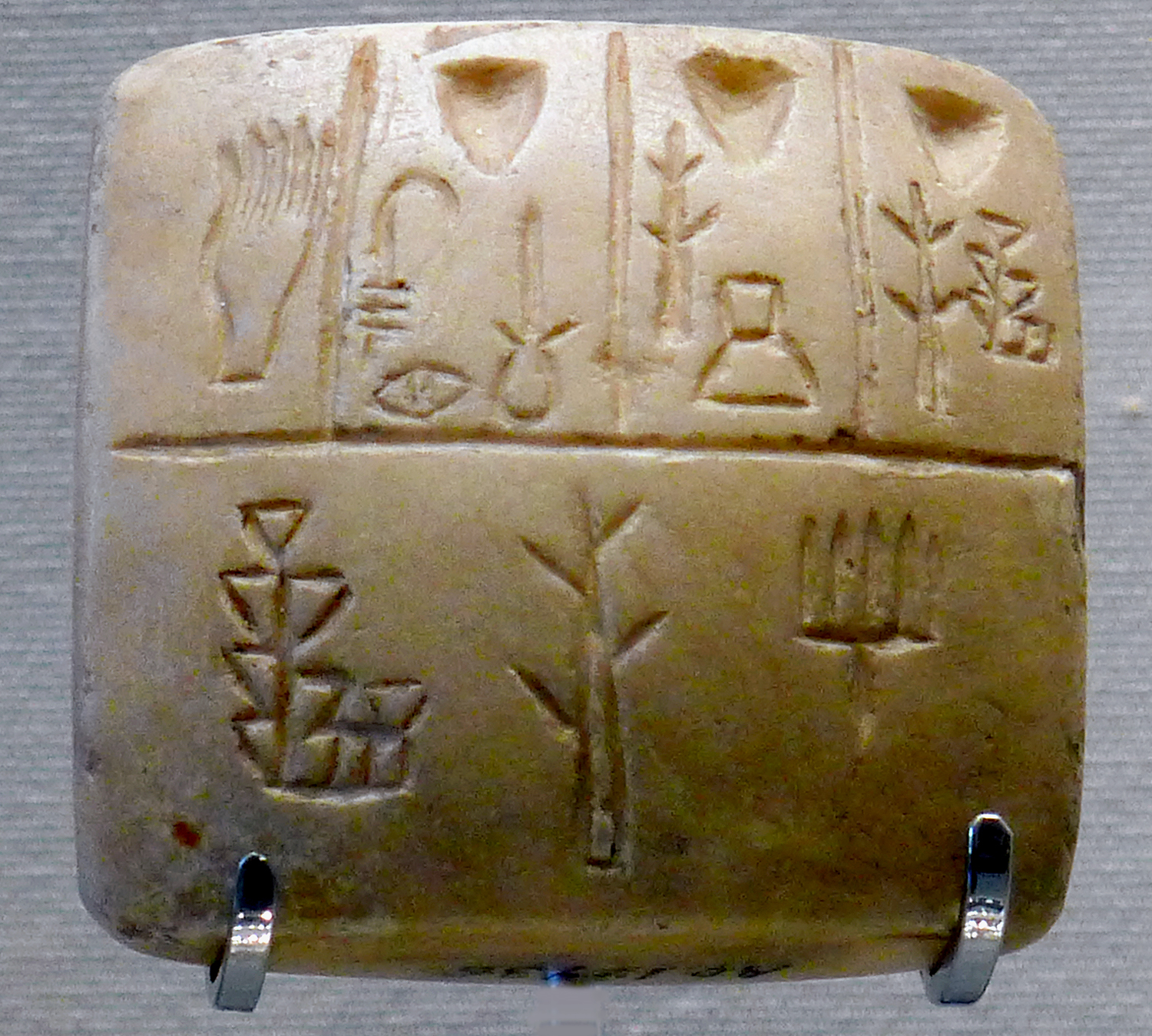
A tablet with proto-cuneiform pictographic characters, end of 4th millennium BC, Uruk III. This is thought to be a list of slaves' names, the hand in the upper left corner representing the owner.

The cuneiform script was developed from pictographic proto-writing in the late 4th millennium BC, stemming from the Near Eastern token system that was used for accounting. The meaning and usage of these tokens is still a matter of debate. These tokens were in use from the 9th millennium BC and remained in occasional use into the late 2nd millennium BC. Early tokens with pictographic shapes of animals, associated with numbers, were discovered in Tell Brak, and date to the mid-4th millennium BC. It has been suggested that the token shapes were the original basis for some of the Sumerian pictographs.

Mesopotamia's "proto-literate" period spans roughly the 35th to 32nd centuries BC. The first unequivocal written documents start with the Uruk IV period, from c. 3300 BC, followed by tablets found in Uruk III, Jemdet Nasr, Early Dynastic I Ur and Susa (in Proto-Elamite) dating to the period until c. 2900 BC.

Originally, pictographs were either drawn on clay tablets in vertical columns with a sharpened reed stylus or incised in stone. This early style lacked the characteristic wedge shape of the strokes. Most Proto-Cuneiform records from this period were of an accounting nature. The proto-cuneiform sign list has grown, as new texts are discovered, and shrunk, as variant signs are combined. The current sign list is 705 elements long with 42 being numeric and four considered pre-proto-Elamite.

Certain signs to indicate names of gods, countries, cities, vessels, birds, trees, etc., are known as determinatives and were the Sumerian signs of the terms in question, added as a guide for the reader. Proper names continued to be usually written in purely "logographic" fashion.

=== Archaic cuneiform (c. 2900 BC) ===
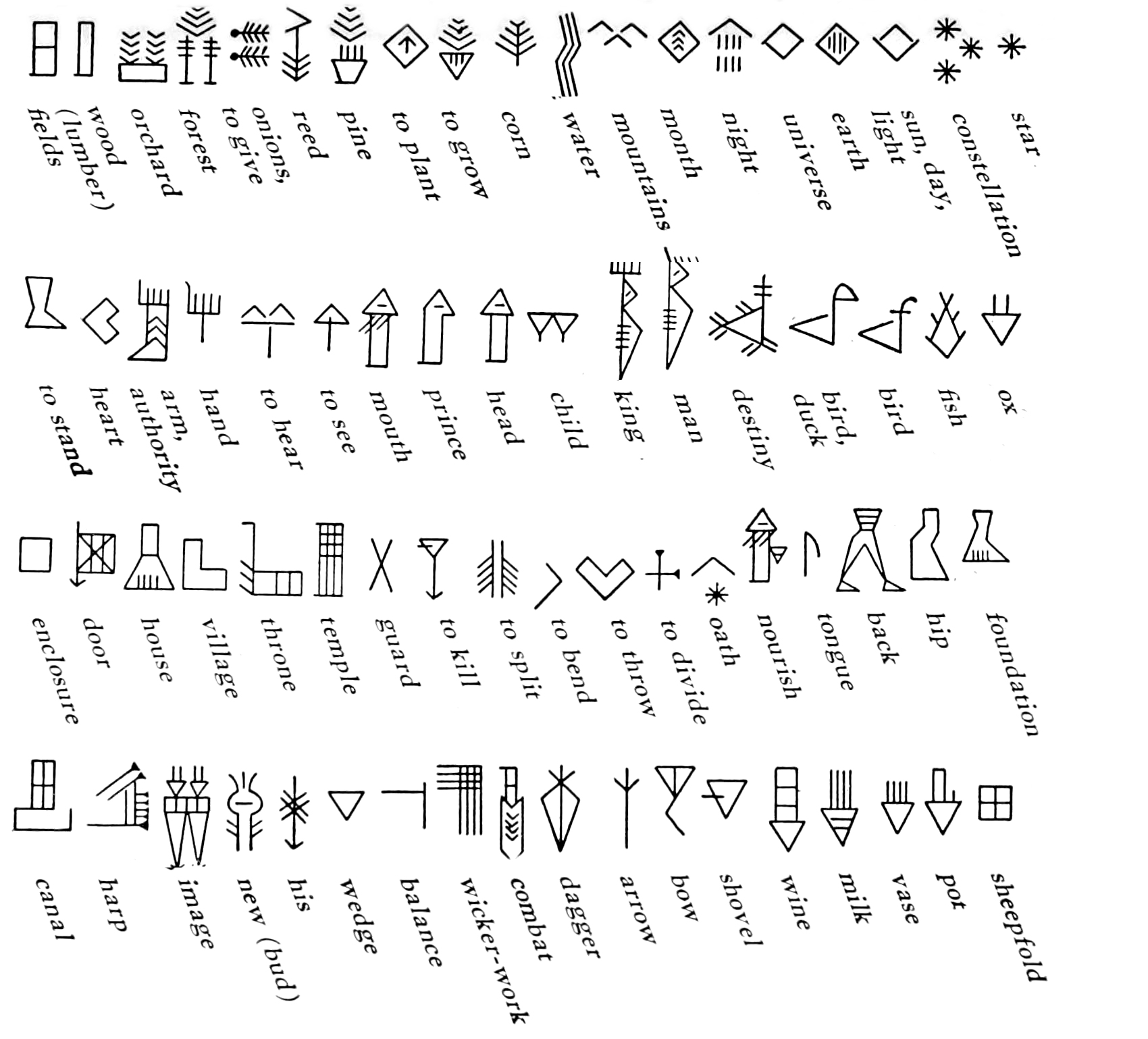
Early pictographic signs in archaic cuneiform, used vertically before c. 2300 BC.

The first inscribed tablets were purely pictographic, which makes it technically difficult to determine which language they represent. Different languages have been proposed, though usually Sumerian is assumed. Later tablets dating after c. 2900 BC start to use syllabic elements, which clearly show a language structure typical of the agglutinative Sumerian language. The first tablets using syllabic elements date to the Early Dynastic I–II periods c. 2800 BC, and they are agreed to be clearly in Sumerian.

About 2800 BC some pictographic elements started to be used for their phonetic syllabic value, permitting the recording of abstract ideas and personal names. Many pictographs began to lose their original function, and a given sign could have various meanings depending on context. The sign inventory was reduced from some 1,500 signs to some 600 signs, and writing became increasingly phonological. Determinative signs were re-introduced to avoid ambiguity. Cuneiform writing proper thus arises from the more primitive system of pictographs at about this time, which historians label the Early Bronze Age II epoch.

The earliest known Sumerian king whose name appears on contemporary cuneiform tablets is Enmebaragesi of Kish (fl. c. 2600 BC). Surviving records became less fragmentary for following reigns, and by the arrival of Sargon it had become standard practice for each major city-state to date documents by year-names, commemorating the exploits of its king.

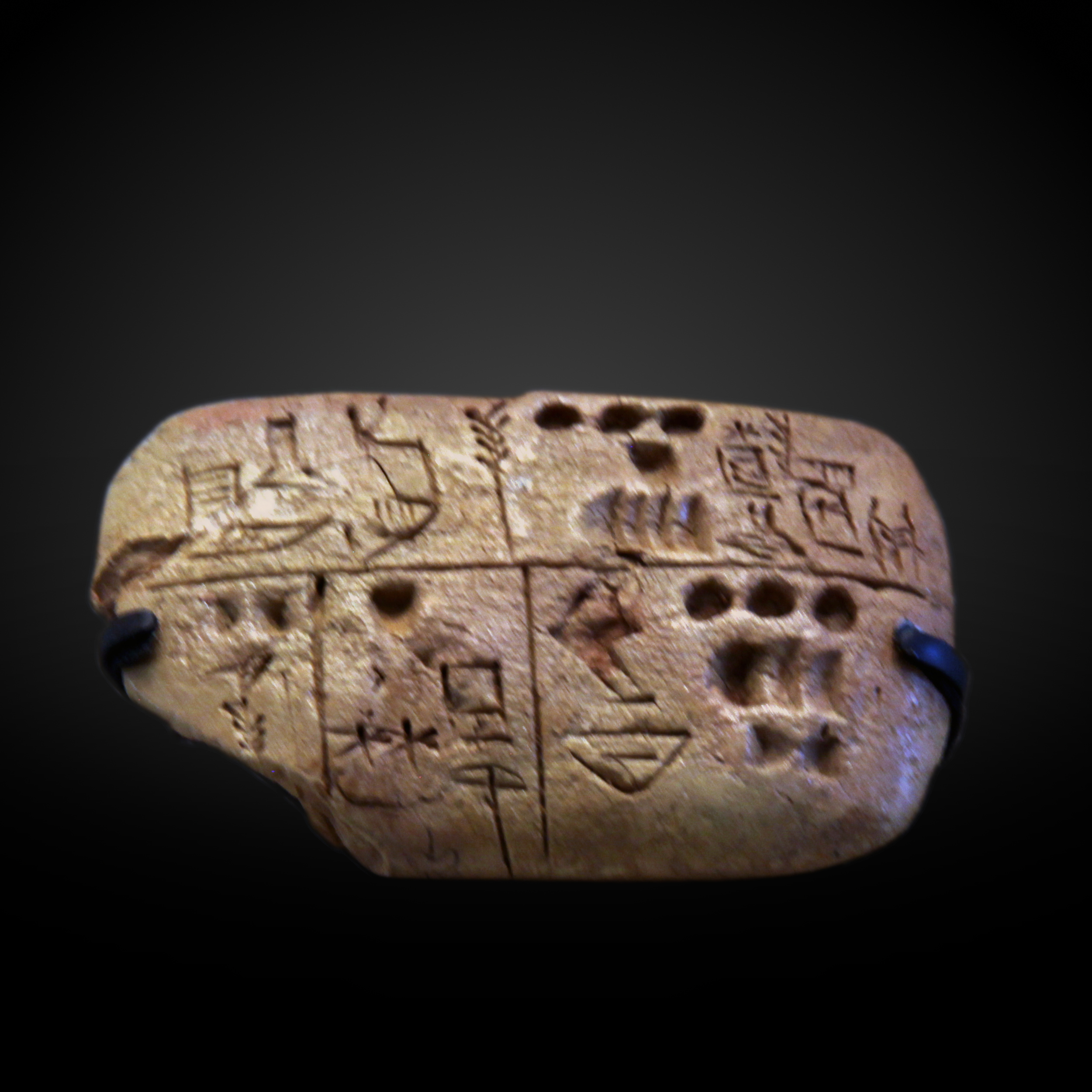
A proto-cuneiform tablet, end of the 4th millennium BC

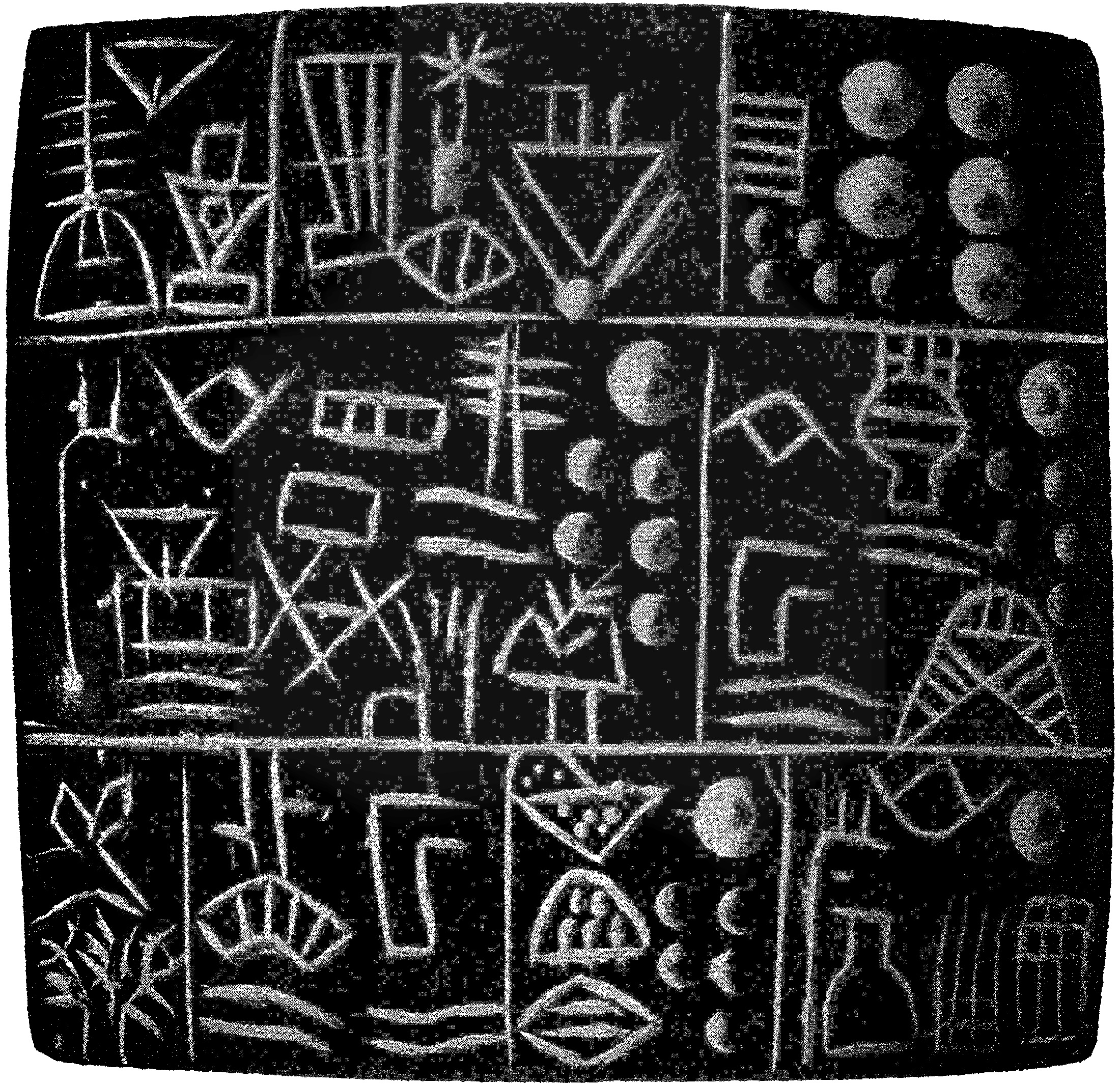
A proto-cuneiform tablet, Jemdet Nasr period, c. 3100–2900 BC

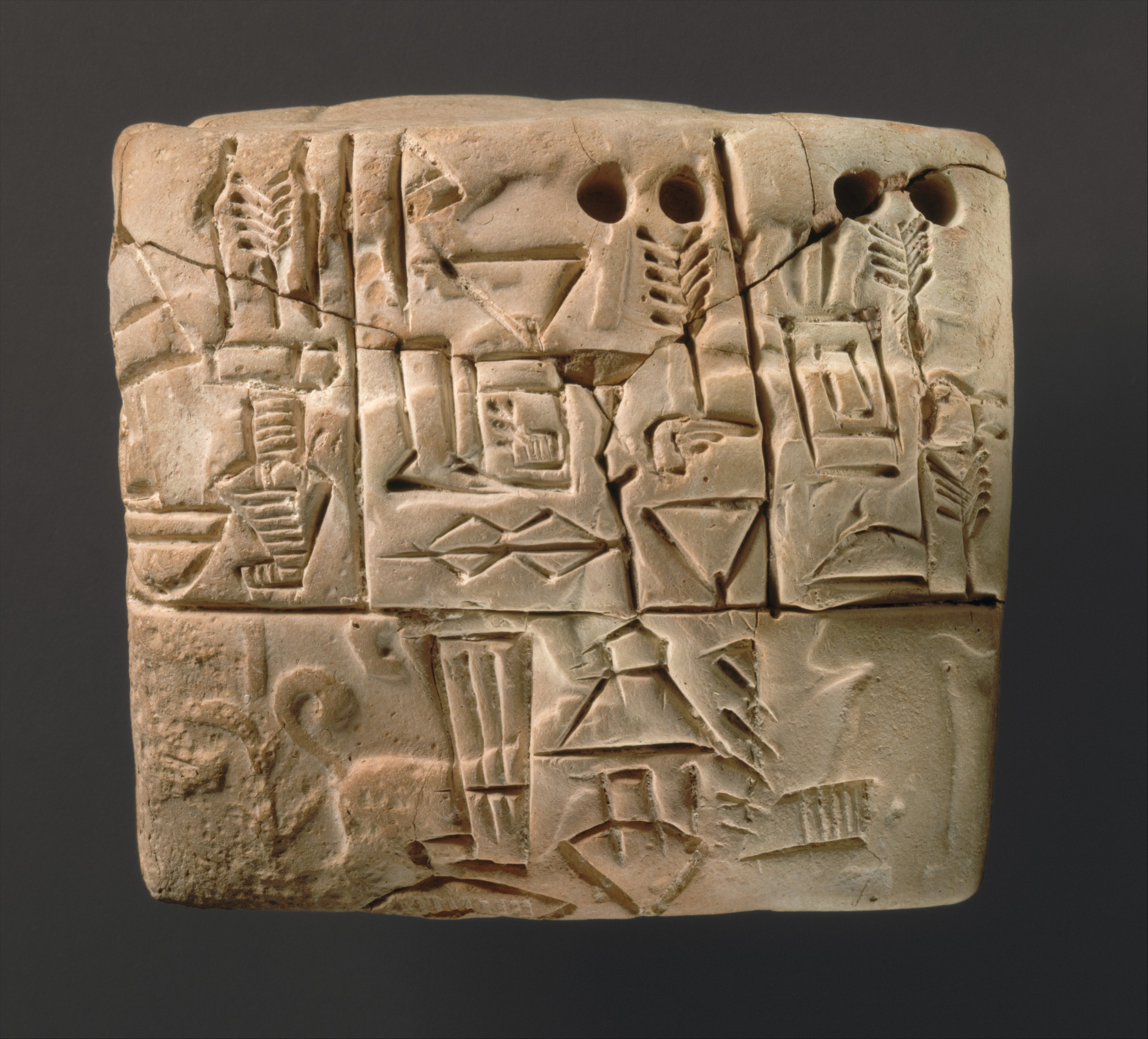
A proto-cuneiform tablet, Jemdet Nasr period, c. 3100–2900 BC. A dog on a leash is visible in the background of the lower panel.

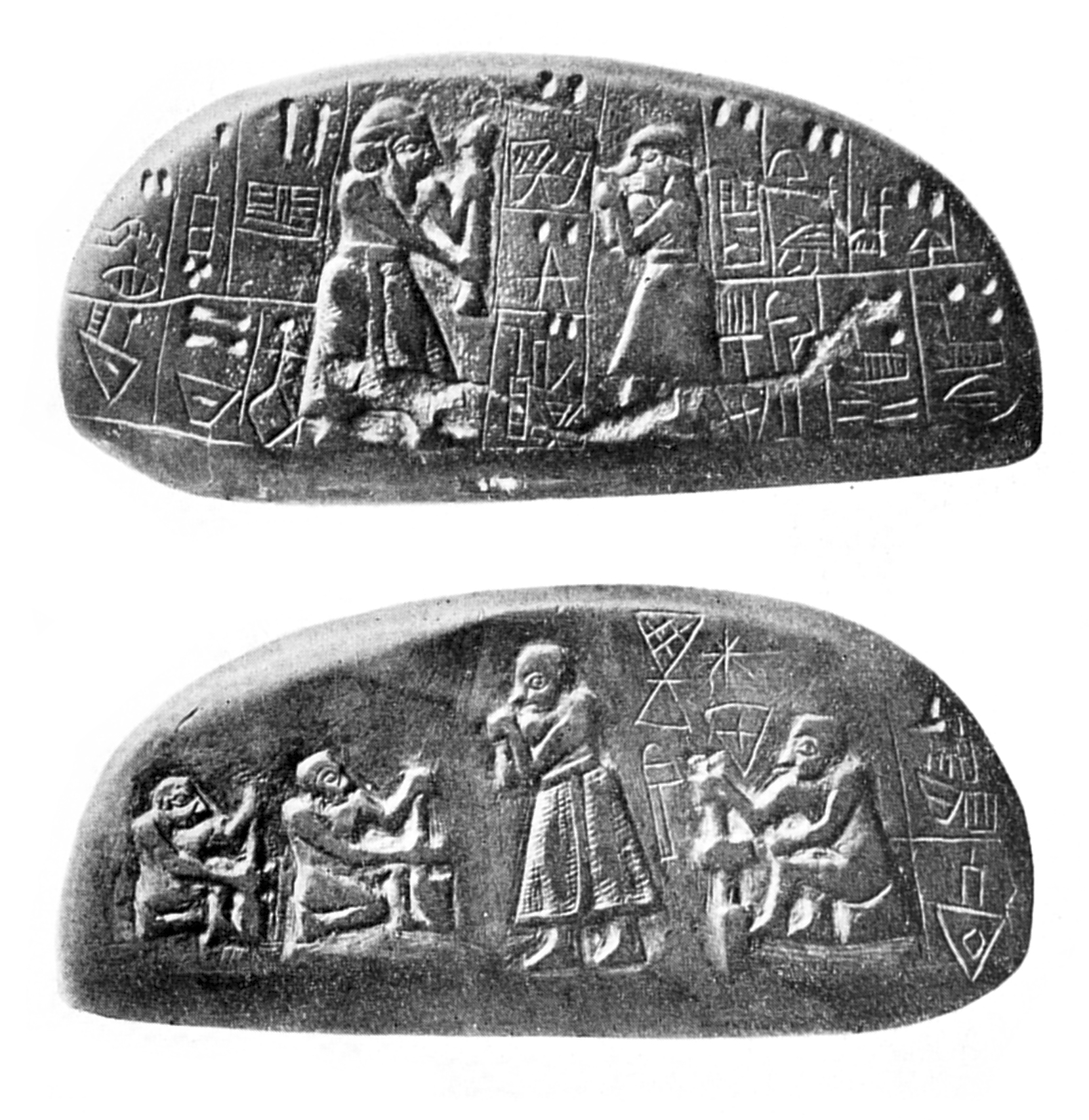
The Blau Monuments combine proto-cuneiform characters and illustrations, 3100–2700 BC. British Museum.

==== Cuneiforms and hieroglyphs ====
Geoffrey Sampson stated that Egyptian hieroglyphs "came into existence a little after Sumerian script, and, probably, [were] invented under the influence of the latter", and that it is "probable that the general idea of expressing words of a language in writing was brought to Egypt from Sumerian Mesopotamia". There are many instances of Egypt-Mesopotamia relations at the time of the invention of writing, and standard reconstructions of the development of writing generally place the development of the Sumerian proto-cuneiform script before the development of Egyptian hieroglyphs, with the suggestion the former influenced the latter. Given the lack of direct evidence for the transfer of writing, "no definitive determination has been made as to the origin of hieroglyphics in ancient Egypt".

=== Early Dynastic cuneiform (c. 2500 BC) ===
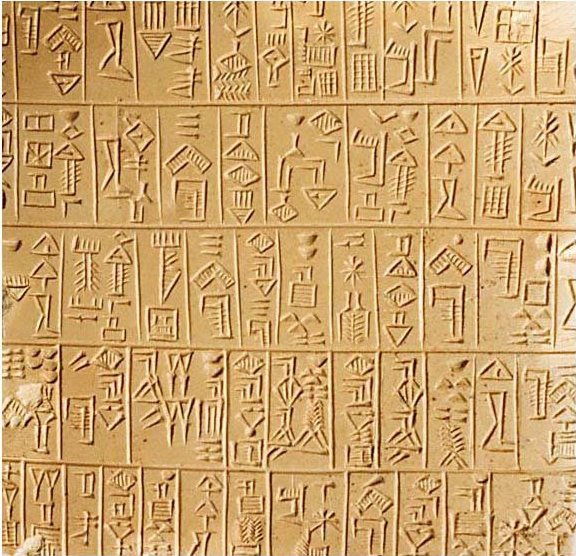
A Sumerian inscription in monumental archaic style, c. 26th century BC

Early cuneiform inscriptions were made by using a pointed stylus, sometimes called "linear cuneiform". Many of the early dynastic inscriptions, particularly those made on stone, continued to use the linear style as late as c. 2000 BC.

In the mid-3rd millennium BC, a new wedge-tipped stylus was introduced which was pushed into the clay, producing wedge-shaped cuneiform. This development made writing quicker and easier, especially when writing on soft clay. By adjusting the relative position of the stylus to the tablet, the writer could use a single tool to make a variety of impressions. For numbers, a round-tipped stylus was initially used, until the wedge-tipped stylus was generalized. The direction of writing was from top-to-bottom and right-to-left. Cuneiform clay tablets could be fired in kilns to bake them hard, and so provide a permanent record, or they could be left moist and recycled if permanence was not needed. Most surviving cuneiform tablets were of the latter kind, accidentally preserved when fires destroyed the tablets' storage place and effectively baked them, unintentionally ensuring their longevity.

From linear to angular

Wedge-tipped stylus for cuneiform writing on clay tablets

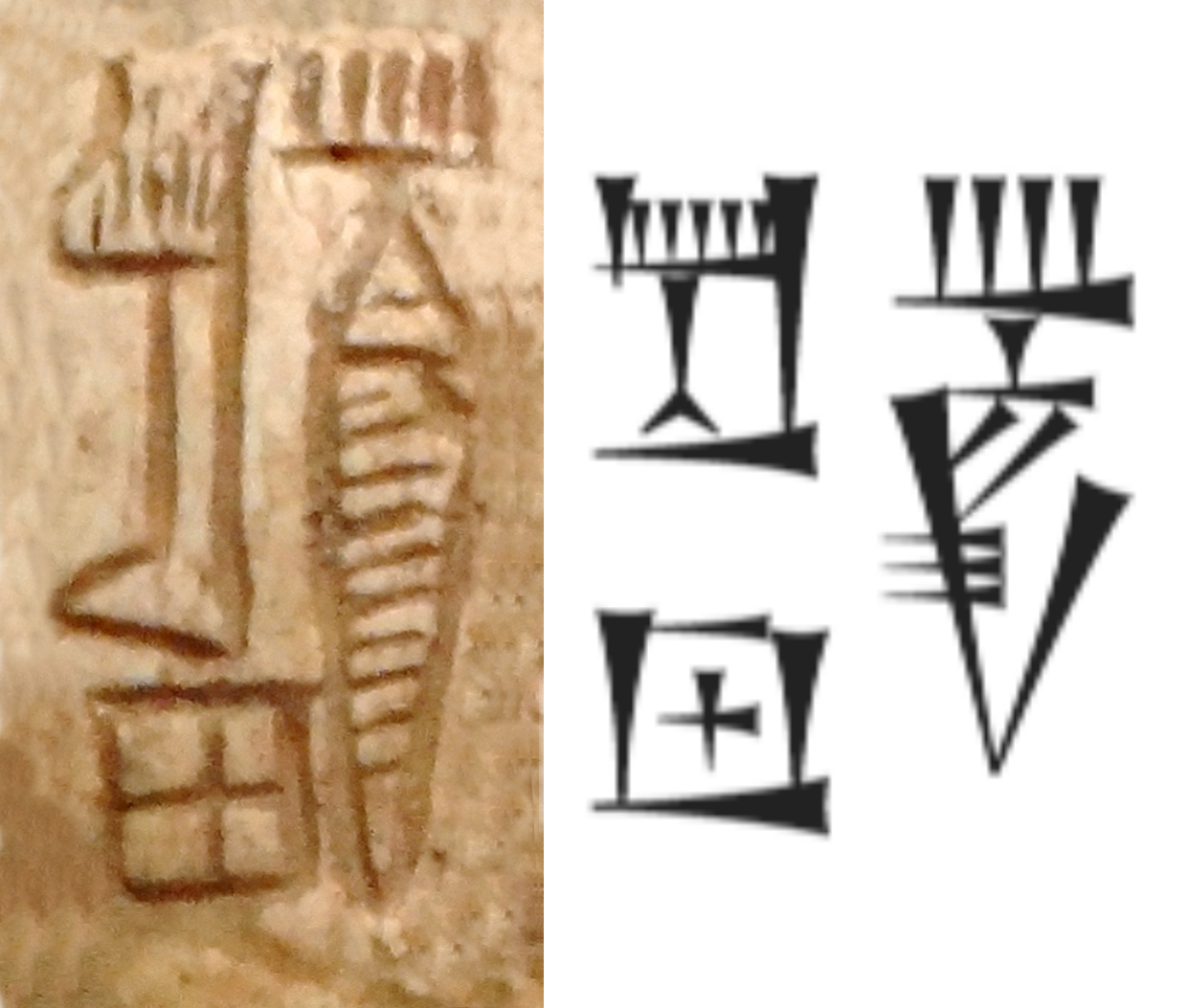
The regnal name "Lugal-dalu" in archaic linear script c. 2500 BC, and the same name stylized with standard Sumero-Akkadian cuneiform (𒈗𒁕𒇻)

The script was widely used on commemorative stelae and carved reliefs to record the achievements of the ruler in whose honor the monument had been erected. The spoken language included many homophones and near-homophones, and in the beginning, similar-sounding words such as "life" [til] and "arrow" [ti] were written with the same symbol (𒋾). As a result, many signs gradually changed from being logograms to also functioning as syllabograms, so that for example, the sign for the word "arrow" would become the sign for the sound "ti".

Syllabograms were used in Sumerian writing especially to express grammatical elements, and their use was further developed and modified in the writing of the Akkadian language to express its sounds. Often, words that had a similar meaning but very different sounds were written with the same symbol. For instance the Sumerian words 'tooth' [zu], 'mouth' [ka] and 'voice' [gu] were all written with the original pictogram for mouth (𒅗).

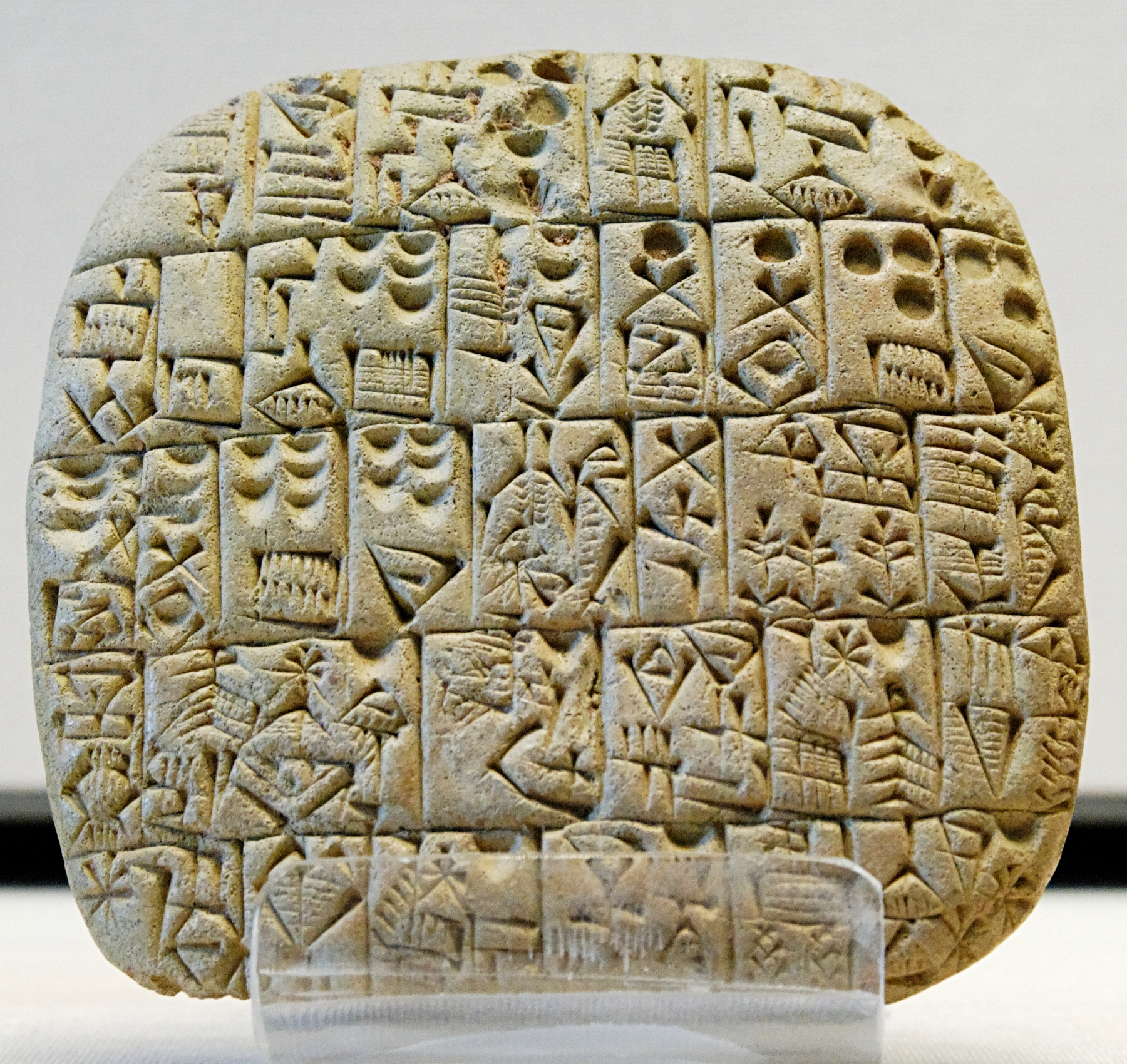
A contract for the sale of a field and a house, in the wedge-shaped cuneiform adapted for clay tablets, Shuruppak, c. 2600 BC

Words that sounded alike would have different signs; for instance, the syllable [ɡu] had fourteen different symbols.

The inventory of signs was expanded by the combination of existing signs into compound signs. They could either derive their meaning from a combination of the meanings of both original signs (e.g. 𒅗 ka 'mouth' and 𒀀 a 'water' were combined to form the sign for 𒅘 nag̃ 'drink', formally KA×A; cf. Chinese compound ideographs), or one sign could suggest the meaning and the other the pronunciation (e.g. 𒅗 ka 'mouth' was combined with the sign 𒉣 nun 'prince' to express the word 𒅻 nundum, meaning 'lip', formally KA×NUN; cf. Chinese phono-semantic compounds).

Another way of expressing words that had no sign of their own was by so-called 'Diri compounds' – sign sequences that have, in combination, a reading different from the sum of the individual constituent signs (for example, the compound IGI.A (𒅆𒀀) – "eye" + "water" – has the reading imhur, meaning "foam").

Several symbols had too many meanings to permit clarity. Therefore, symbols were put together to indicate both the sound and the meaning of a symbol. For instance, the word 'raven' (UGA) had the same logogram (𒉀) as the word 'soap' (NAGA), the name of a city (EREŠ), and the patron goddess of Eresh (NISABA). To disambiguate and identify the word more precisely, two phonetic complements were added – Ú (𒌑) for the syllable [u] in front of the symbol and GA (𒂵) for the syllable [ga] behind. Finally, the symbol for 'bird', MUŠEN (𒄷) was added to ensure proper interpretation. As a result, the whole word could be spelt 𒌑𒉀𒂵𒄷, i.e. Ú.NAGA.GA^{mušen} (among the many variant spellings that the word could have).

For unknown reasons, cuneiform pictographs, until then written vertically, were rotated 90° counterclockwise, in effect putting them on their side. This change first occurred slightly before the Akkadian period, at the time of the Uruk ruler Lugalzagesi (r. c. 2294–2270 BC). The vertical style remained for monumental purposes on stone stelas until the middle of the 2nd millennium.

Written Sumerian was used as a scribal language until the 1st century AD. The spoken language died out between c. 2100 and 1700 BC.

=== Sumero-Akkadian cuneiform ===
Sumero-Akkadian cuneiform syllabary
(c. 2200 BC)
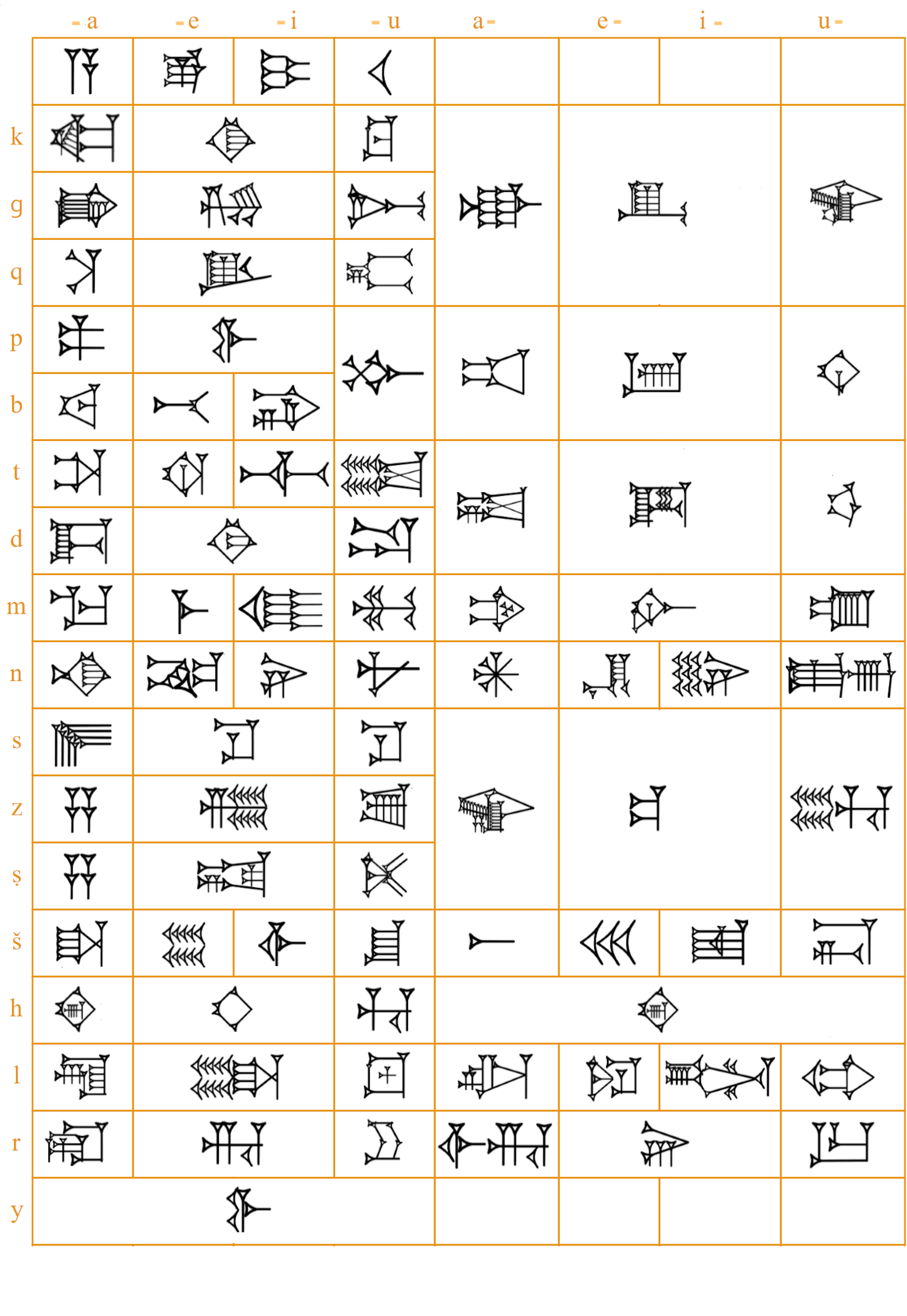
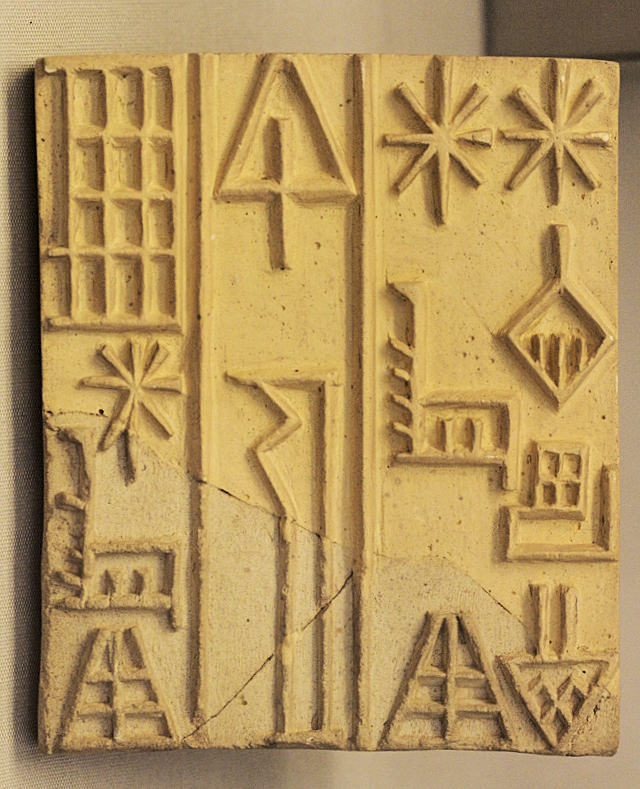
Left: Sumero-Akkadian cuneiform syllabary, used by early Akkadian rulers. Right: Seal of Naram-Sin of Akkad (reversed for readability), c. 2250 BC. The name of Naram-Sin (Akkadian: 𒀭𒈾𒊏𒄠𒀭𒂗𒍪: ^{D}Na-ra-am ^{D}Sîn, Sîn being written 𒂗𒍪 EN.ZU), appears vertically in the right column. British Museum. These are some of the more important signs: the complete Sumero-Akkadian list of characters actually numbers about 600, with many more "values", or pronunciation possibilities.

The archaic cuneiform script was adopted by the Akkadian Empire from the 24th century BC. The Akkadian language being East Semitic, its structure was completely different from Sumerian. The Akkadians found a practical solution in writing their language phonetically, using the corresponding Sumerian phonetic signs. Still, many of the Sumerian characters were retained for their logographic value as well: for example the character for "sheep" was retained, but was now pronounced immerum, rather than the Sumerian udu. Such retained individual signs or, sometimes, entire sign combinations with logographic value are known as Sumerograms, a type of heterogram.

The East Semitic languages employed equivalents for many signs that were distorted or abbreviated to represent new values because the syllabic nature of the script as refined by the Sumerians was not intuitive to Semitic speakers. From the beginning of the Middle Bronze Age (20th century BC), the script evolved to accommodate the various dialects of Akkadian: Old Akkadian, Babylonian, and Assyrian. At this stage, the former pictograms were reduced to a high level of abstraction, and were composed of only five basic wedge shapes: horizontal, vertical, two diagonals and the Winkelhaken impressed vertically by the tip of the stylus. The signs exemplary of these basic wedges are:

- AŠ (B001, U+12038) 𒀸: horizontal;
- DIŠ (B748, U+12079) 𒁹: vertical;
- GE_{23}, DIŠ tenû (B575, U+12039) 𒀹: downward diagonal;
- GE_{22} (B647, U+1203A) 𒀺: upward diagonal;
- U (B661, U+1230B) 𒌋: the Winkelhaken.
2nd-millennium BC cuneiforms

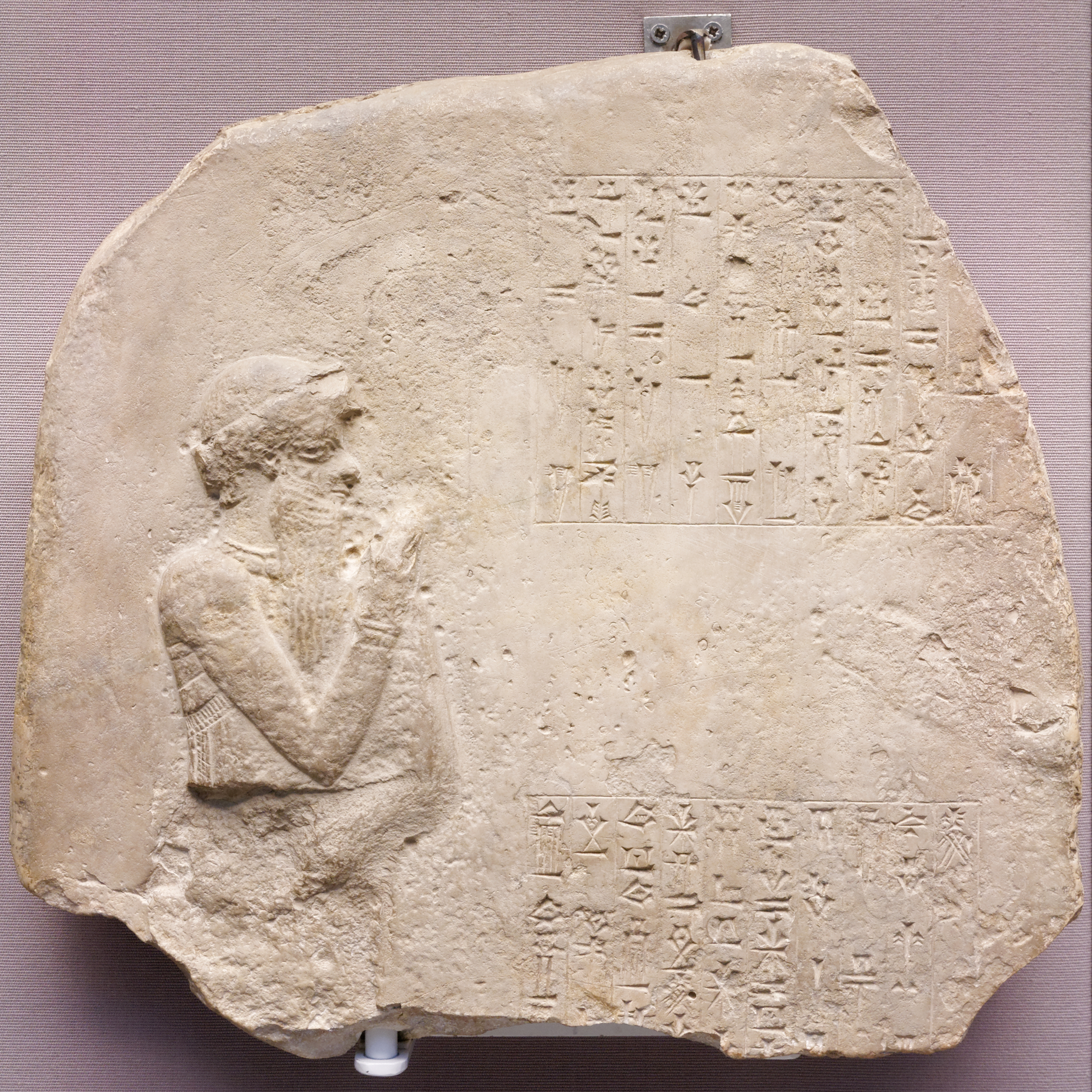
The Babylonian king Hammurabi still used vertical cuneiform c. 1750 BC.

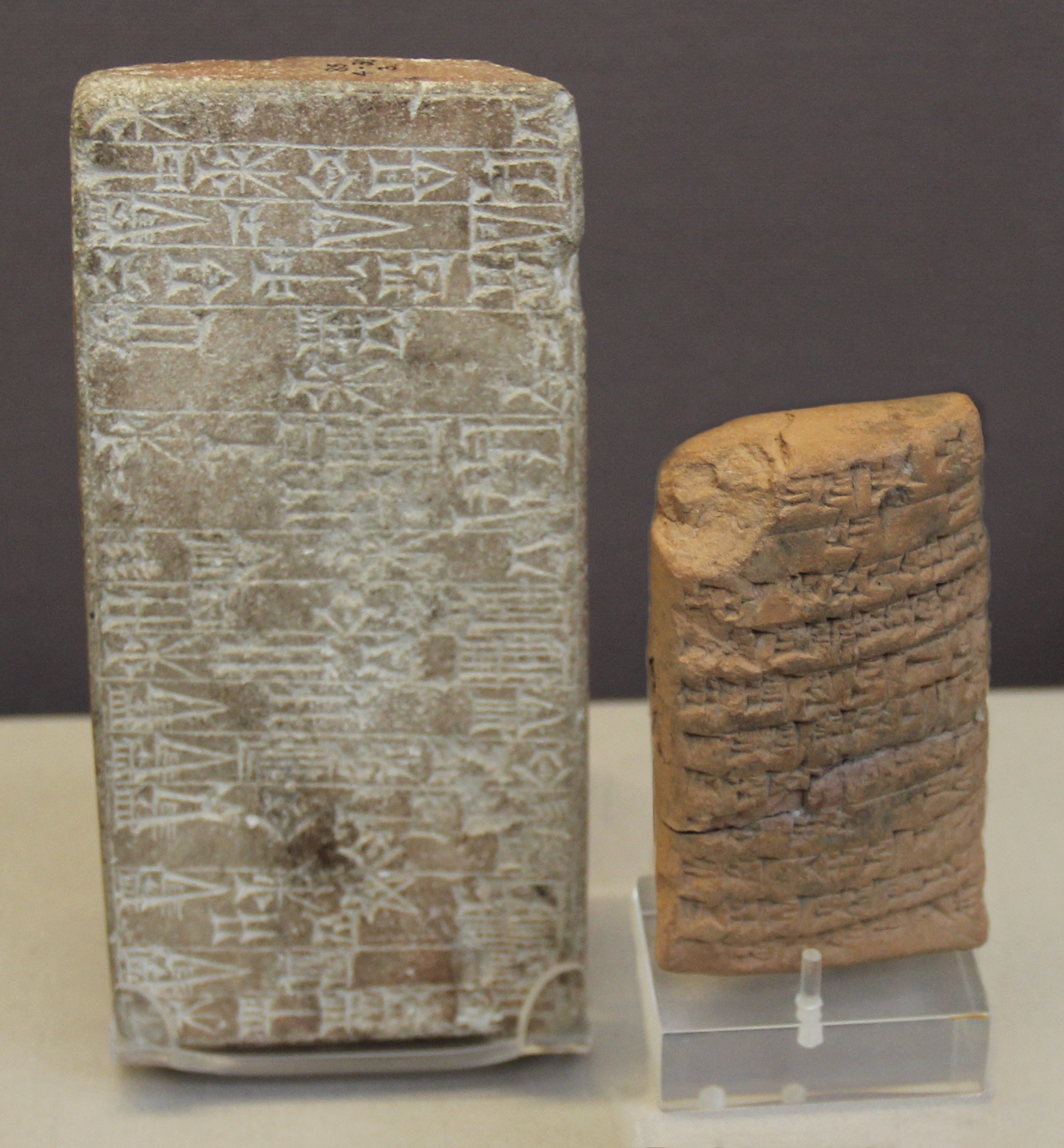
Babylonian tablets of the time of Hammurabi (c. 1750 BC).

Sumero-Akkadian cuneiform, either in inscriptions or on clay tablets, continued to be in use throughout the 2nd millennium BC.

Except for the Winkelhaken, which has no tail, the length of the wedges' tails could vary as required for sign composition.

Signs tilted by about 45 degrees are called tenû in Akkadian, thus DIŠ is a vertical wedge and DIŠ tenû a diagonal one. If a sign is modified with additional wedges, this is called gunû or "gunification"; if signs are cross-hatched with additional Winkelhaken, they are called šešig; if signs are modified by the removal of a wedge or wedges, they are called nutillu.

"Typical" signs have about five to ten wedges, while complex ligatures can consist of twenty or more, although it is not always clear if a ligature should be considered a single sign or two collated, but distinct signs. The ligature KAxGUR_{7} consists of 31 strokes.

Most later adaptations of Sumerian cuneiform preserved at least some aspects of the Sumerian script. Written Akkadian included phonetic symbols from the Sumerian syllabary, together with logograms that were read as whole words. Many signs in the script were polyvalent, having both a syllabic and logographic meaning. The complexity of the system bears a resemblance to Old Japanese, written in a Chinese-derived script, where some of these Sinograms were used as logograms and others as phonetic characters.

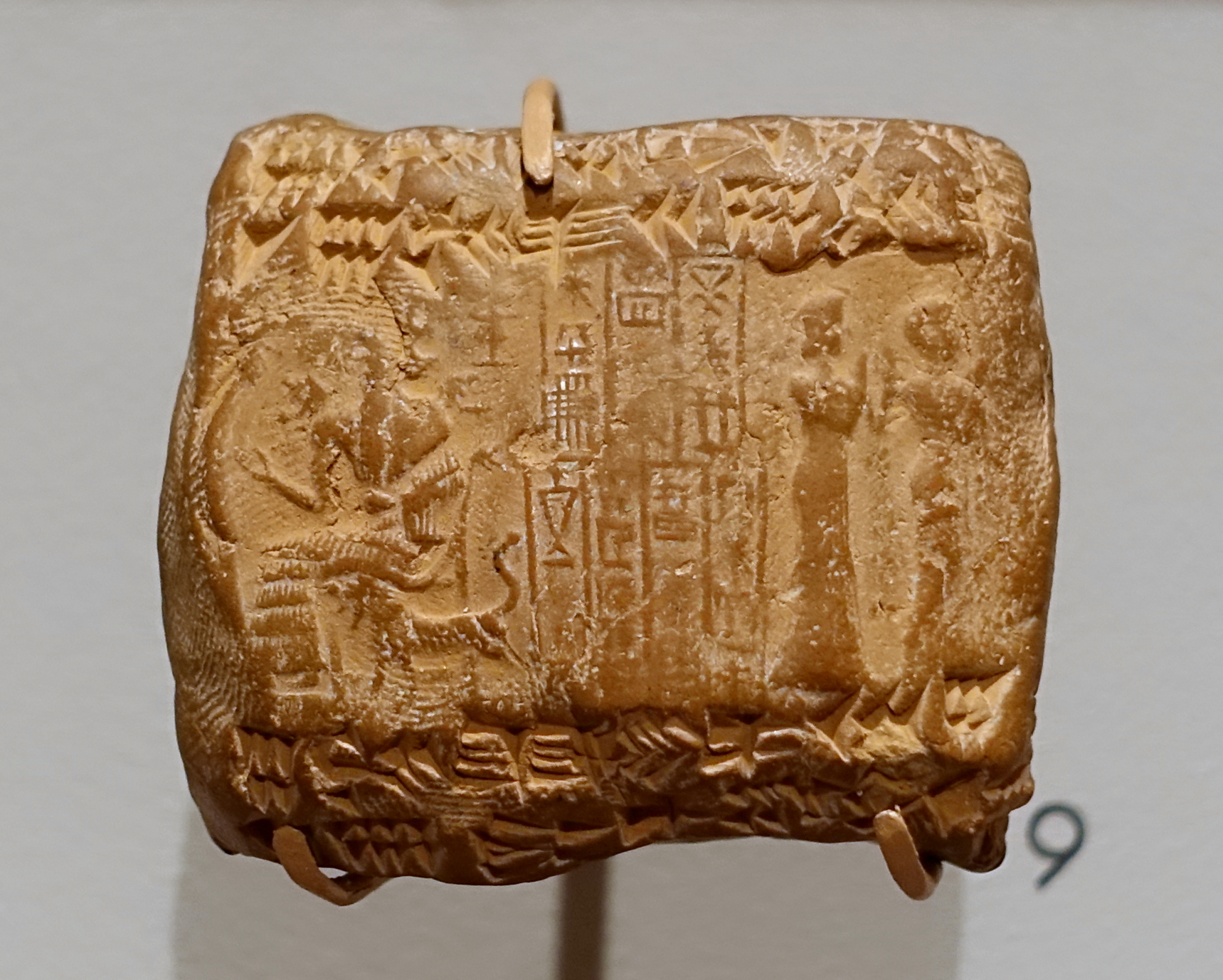
Cuneiform tablet in envelope with cylinder seal impressions, Ur III Period, c. 2100–2000 BC. Harvard Semitic Museum, Cambridge, Massachusetts

This "mixed" method of writing continued through the end of the Babylonian and Assyrian empires, although there were periods when "purism" was in fashion and there was a more marked tendency to spell out the words laboriously, in preference to using signs with a phonetic complement. Yet even in those days, the Babylonian syllabary remained a mixture of logographic and phonemic writing.

A number of tablets include "check marks" either incised in the wet clay (PAP-marks for example) or after the clay is dry using ink as was seen in tablets from Mari.

Cuneiform tablets were sometimes encased in sealed clay envelopes to be opened by the receiver of the text. They included legal and administrative texts, and letters. Use began in the Early Dynastic IIIb period (c. 2500-2340 BC) and continued until cuneiform tablets fell out of use. Geographical extent appears to be restricted to Mesopotamia though broken envelope fragments were not always recorded in excavations so that is uncertain. The envelopes typically were marked with the name of the receiver and the seal of the sender (example - "To Ennum-Aššur, son of Šalim-Aššur. Seal of Anna-anna). A number of still encased tablets have been found and in the early days some of the envelopes were broken open. Now coaxial tomography is used to read the text.

=== Elamite cuneiform ===
Elamite cuneiform was a simplified form of the Sumero-Akkadian cuneiform, used to write the Elamite language in the area that corresponds to modern Iran between the 3rd millennium and 4th century BC. Elamite cuneiform at times competed with other local scripts, Proto-Elamite and Linear Elamite. The earliest known Elamite cuneiform text is a treaty between Akkadians and the Elamites that dates back to 2200 BC. Some believe it might have been in use since 2500 BC. The tablets are poorly preserved, so only limited parts can be read, but it is understood that the text is a treaty between the Akkad king Nāramsîn and Elamite ruler Hita, as indicated by frequent references like "Nāramsîn's friend is my friend, Nāramsîn's enemy is my enemy".

The most famous Elamite scriptures and the ones that ultimately led to its decipherment are the ones found in the trilingual Behistun inscriptions, commissioned by the Achaemenid kings. The inscriptions, similar to that of the Rosetta Stone's, were written in three different writing systems. The first was Old Persian, which was deciphered in 1802 by Georg Friedrich Grotefend. The second, Babylonian cuneiform, was deciphered shortly after the Old Persian text. Because Elamite is unlike its neighboring Semitic languages, the script's decipherment was delayed until the 1840s.

Elamite cuneiform appears to have used far fewer signs than its Akkadian prototype and initially relied primarily on syllabograms, but logograms became more common in later texts. Many signs soon acquired highly distinctive local shape variants that are often difficult to recognise as related to their Akkadian prototypes.

=== Hittite cuneiform ===
Hittite cuneiform is an adaptation of Old Assyrian cuneiform to write the Hittite language that emerged c. 1800 BC and was used between the 17th–13th centuries BC. More or less the same Assyrian system was used by the scribes of the Hittite Empire for two other Anatolian languages (a now extinct branch of Indo-European), namely Luwian (alongside the native Anatolian hieroglyphics) and Palaic, as well as for the language isolate Hattic language. When the cuneiform script was adapted to writing Hittite, a layer of Akkadian logographic spellings, also known as Akkadograms, was added to the script, in addition to the Sumerian logograms, or Sumerograms, which were already inherent in the Akkadian writing system and which Hittite also kept. Thus the pronunciations of many Hittite words which were conventionally written by logograms are now unknown.

=== Hurrian and Urartian cuneiform ===
The Hurrian language (attested 2300–1000 BC) and Urartian language (attested in the 9th–6th centuries BC) were also written in adapted versions of Sumero-Akkadian cuneiform. Although the two languages are related, their writing systems seem to have been developed separately. For Hurrian, there were even different systems in different polities (in Mitanni, in Mari, in the Hittite Empire). The Hurrian orthographies were generally characterised by more extensive use of syllabograms and more limited use of logograms than Akkadian. Urartian, in comparison, retained a more significant role for logograms.

=== Neo-Assyrian and Neo-Babylonian cuneiform ===
Neo-Assyrian cuneiform syllabary
(c. 650 BC)
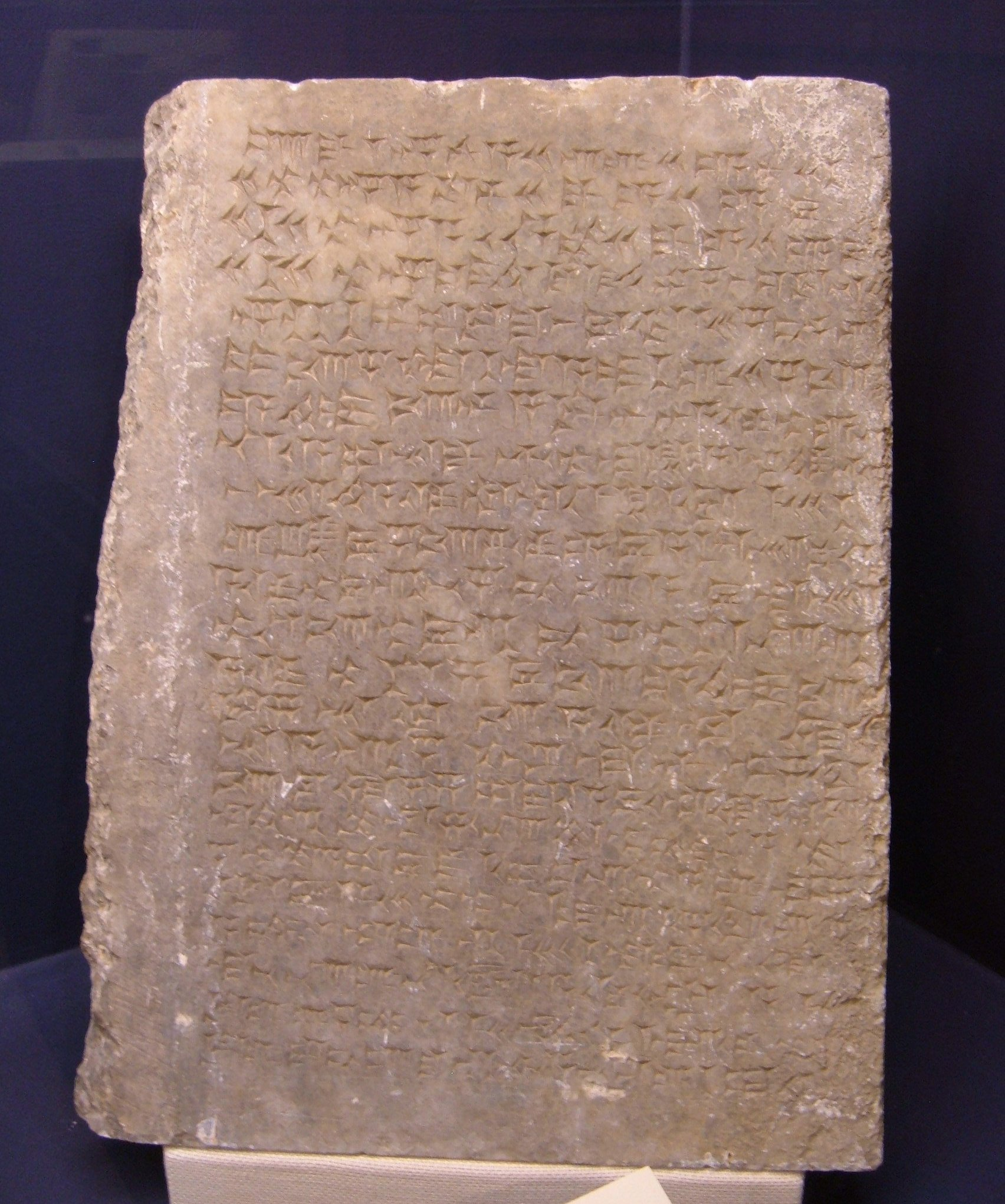
Left: Simplified cuneiform syllabary, in use during the Neo-Assyrian period. The "C" before and after vowels stands for "Consonant". Right: Mesopotamian palace paving slab, c. 600 BC

In the Iron Age (c. 10th–6th centuries BC) during the Neo-Assyrian Empire, Assyrian cuneiform was further simplified. Babylonian cuneiform was simplified along similar lines during that period, albeit to a lesser extent and in a slightly different way. The characters remained the same as those of Sumero-Akkadian cuneiforms, but the graphic design of each character relied more heavily on wedges and square angles, making them significantly more abstract:

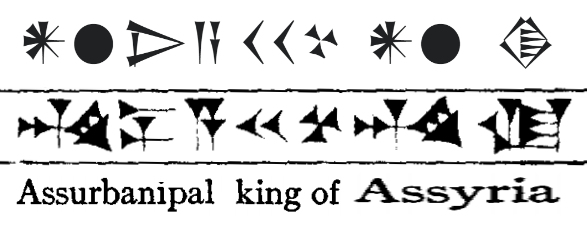
"Assurbanipal King of Assyria"
Aššur-bani-habal šar mat Aššur ^{KI}
Same characters, in the classical Sumero-Akkadian script of c. 2000 BC (top), and in the Neo-Assyrian script of the Rassam cylinder, 643 BC (bottom).

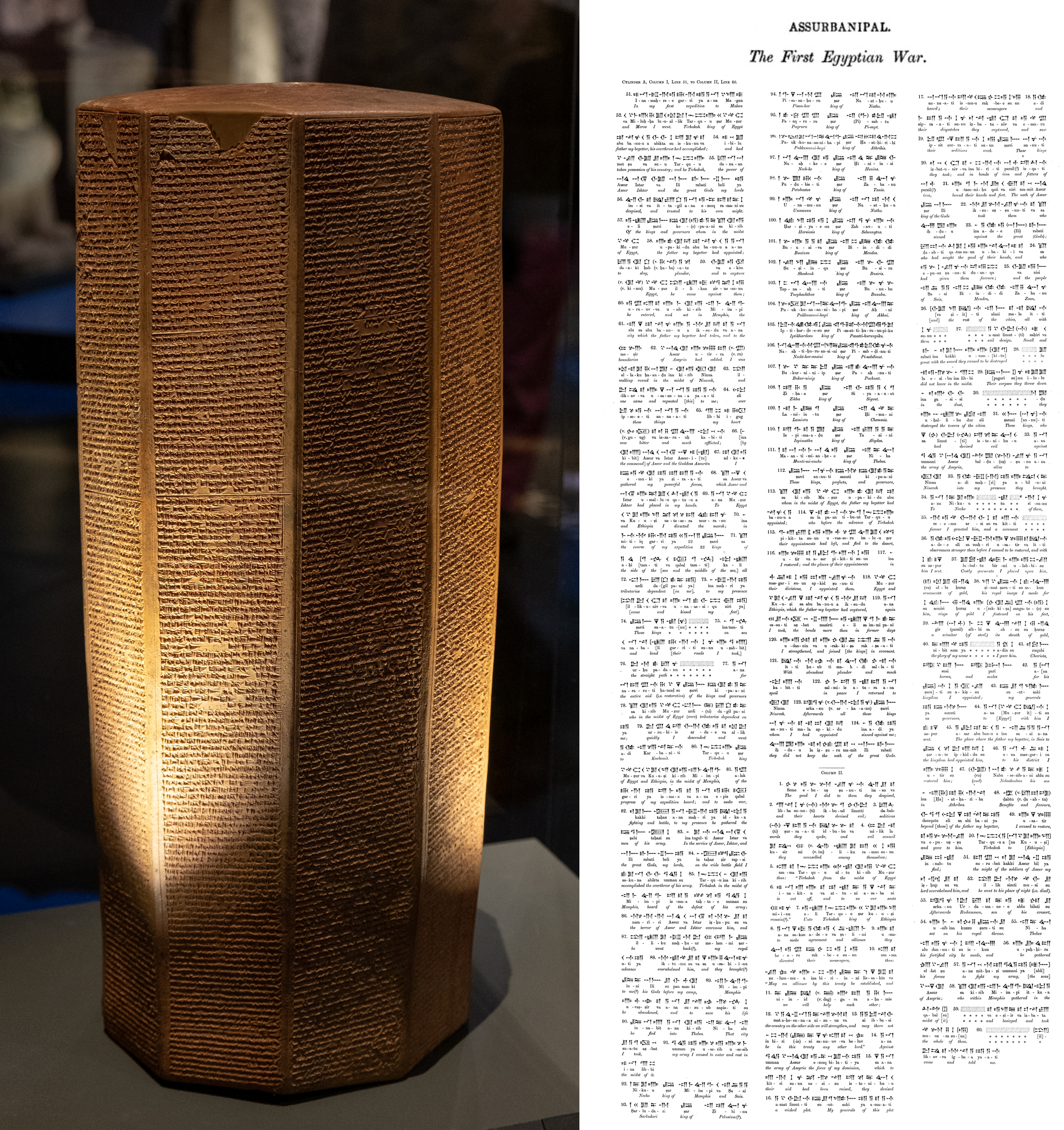
The Rassam cylinder with translation of a segment about the Assyrian conquest of Egypt by Ashurbanipal against "Black Pharaoh" Taharqa, 643 BC

=== Final period of use ===
Beginning in the later half of the 1st millennium BC cuneiform rapidly fell into dis-use. In part this was due to the slow replacement of the Akkadian language by the Aramaic, written in the Aramaic alphabet, in Mesopotamia and the growing influence of the Persian and Greek languages in the region. There is one example of Eastern Aramaic being written in syllabic cuneiform, the "Uruk incantation" (c. 300 BC), now in the Louvre museum. Most exemplars of this period come from Babylon, primarily the Esangil temple area. Many of these were the result of early looting and their exact aracheological context is unknown. Notably there are the Astronomical Diaries (c 650–60 BC), the late Babylonian Temple Rituals, and late Babylonian Priestly Literature. From the earliest part of the period there are a number of texts from the Ebabbar temple in Sippar and the Eanna temple in Uruk. The Graeco-Babyloniaca tablets, dated to the Parthian period (141 BC to 224 AD) show that both Sumerian (largely in the Emesal dialect) and Akkadian were understood in the 1st century BC or later. There are 17 tablets many heavily damaged with unknown findspots but from a school context. Most of the tablets bear Sumerian and/or Akkadian language cuneiform on one face and a Greek transliteration on the other. The latest tablet, an astronomical text, dates to 75 AD.

The last known cuneiform inscription, an astronomical text, was written in 79/80 AD.. The philosopher Iamblichus reportedly had a teacher captured in 116 AD during Trajan's Parthian campaign who had "barbarian learning" which is generally taken as meaning he could write in cuneiform.

=== Derived scripts ===
==== Old Persian cuneiform (5th century BC) ====
Old Persian cuneiform syllabary
(c. 500 BC)
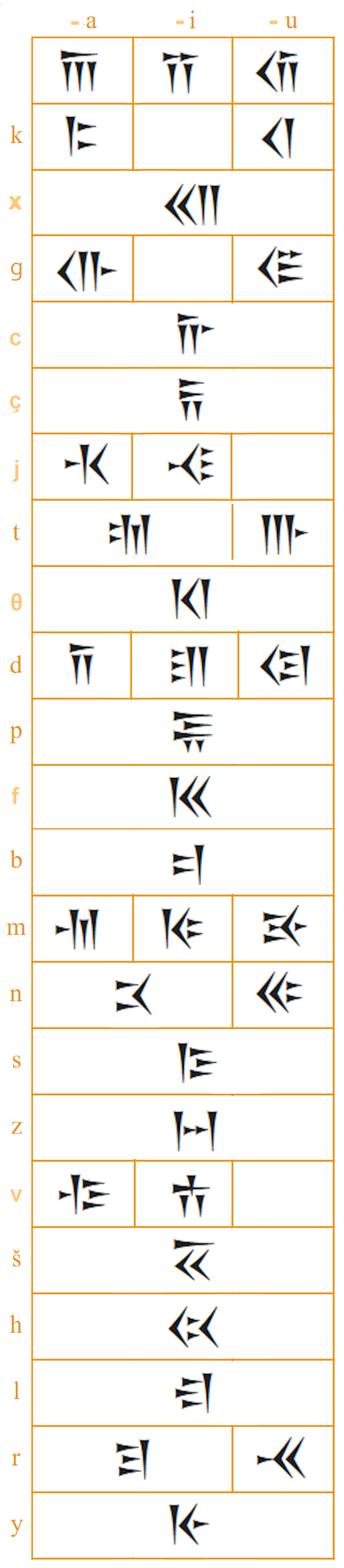
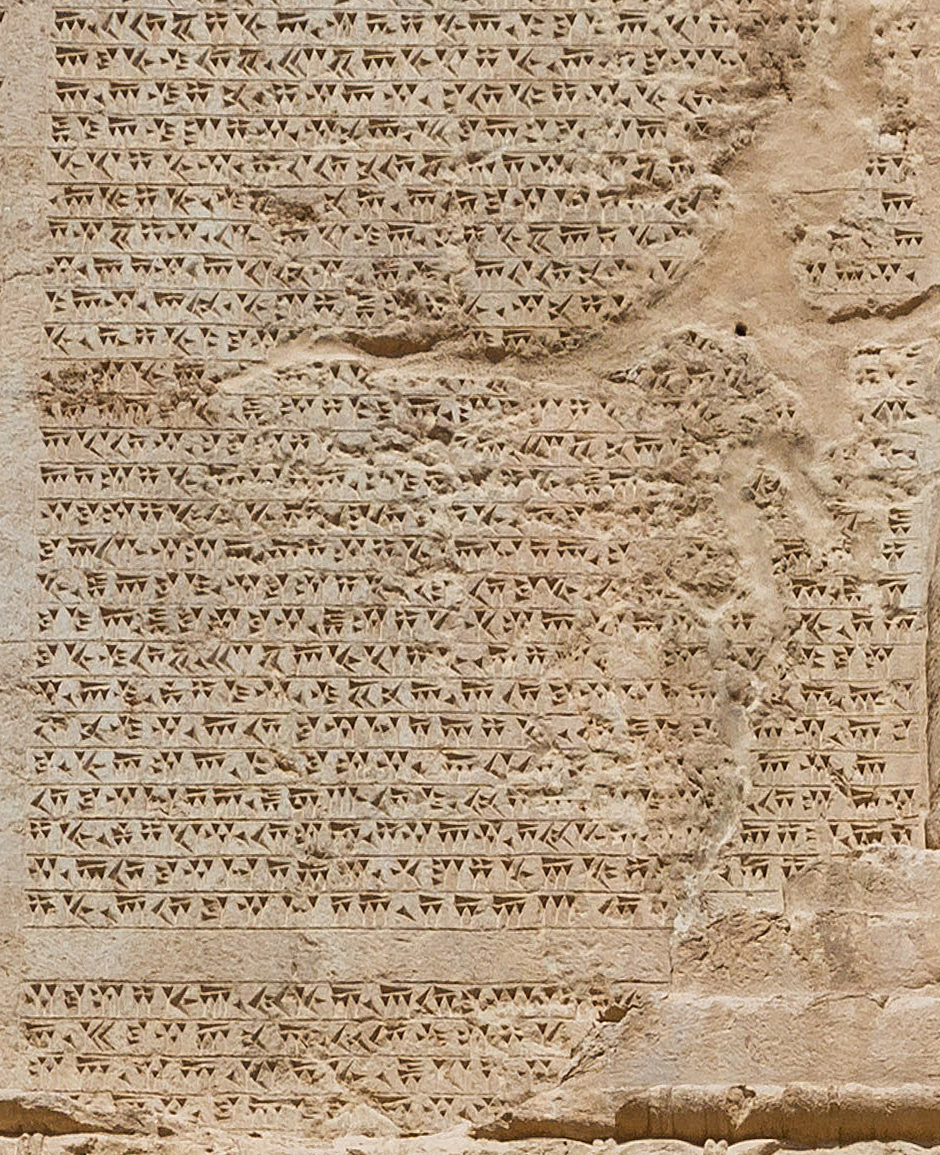
Old Persian cuneiform syllabary (left), and the DNa inscription (part II) of Darius the Great (c. 490 BC), in the newly created Old Persian cuneiform.

The complexity of cuneiforms prompted the development of a number of simplified versions of the script. Old Persian cuneiform was developed with an independent and unrelated set of simple cuneiform characters, by Darius the Great in the 5th century BC. Most scholars consider the cuneiform to be independent of other writing systems at the time, such as Elamite, Akkadian, Hurrian, and Hittite cuneiforms.

It formed a semi-alphabetic syllabary, using far fewer wedge strokes than Assyrian used, together with a handful of logograms for frequently occurring words like "god" (𐏎), "king" (𐏋) or "country" (𐏌). This almost purely alphabetical form of the cuneiform script (36 phonetic characters and 8 logograms), was specially designed and used by the early Achaemenid rulers from the 6th century BC down to the 4th century BC.

Because of its simplicity and logical structure, the Old Persian cuneiform script was the first to be deciphered by modern scholars, starting with the accomplishments of Georg Friedrich Grotefend in 1802. Various ancient bilingual or trilingual inscriptions then permitted to decipher the other, much more complicated and more ancient scripts, as far back as to the 3rd millennium Sumerian script.

==== Ugaritic ====
Ugaritic was written using the Ugaritic alphabet, a standard Semitic style alphabet (an abjad) written using the cuneiform method.

== Archaeology ==
Between 500,000 and 2 million cuneiform tablets are estimated to have been excavated in modern times, of which only approximately 30,000–100,000 have been read or published. The British Museum holds the largest collection (approx. 130,000 tablets), followed by the Vorderasiatisches Museum Berlin, the Louvre, the Istanbul Archaeology Museums, the National Museum of Iraq, the Yale Babylonian Collection (approx. 40,000), and Penn Museum. Most of these have "lain in these collections for a century without being translated, studied or published", as there are only a few hundred qualified cuneiformists in the world.

== Decipherment ==
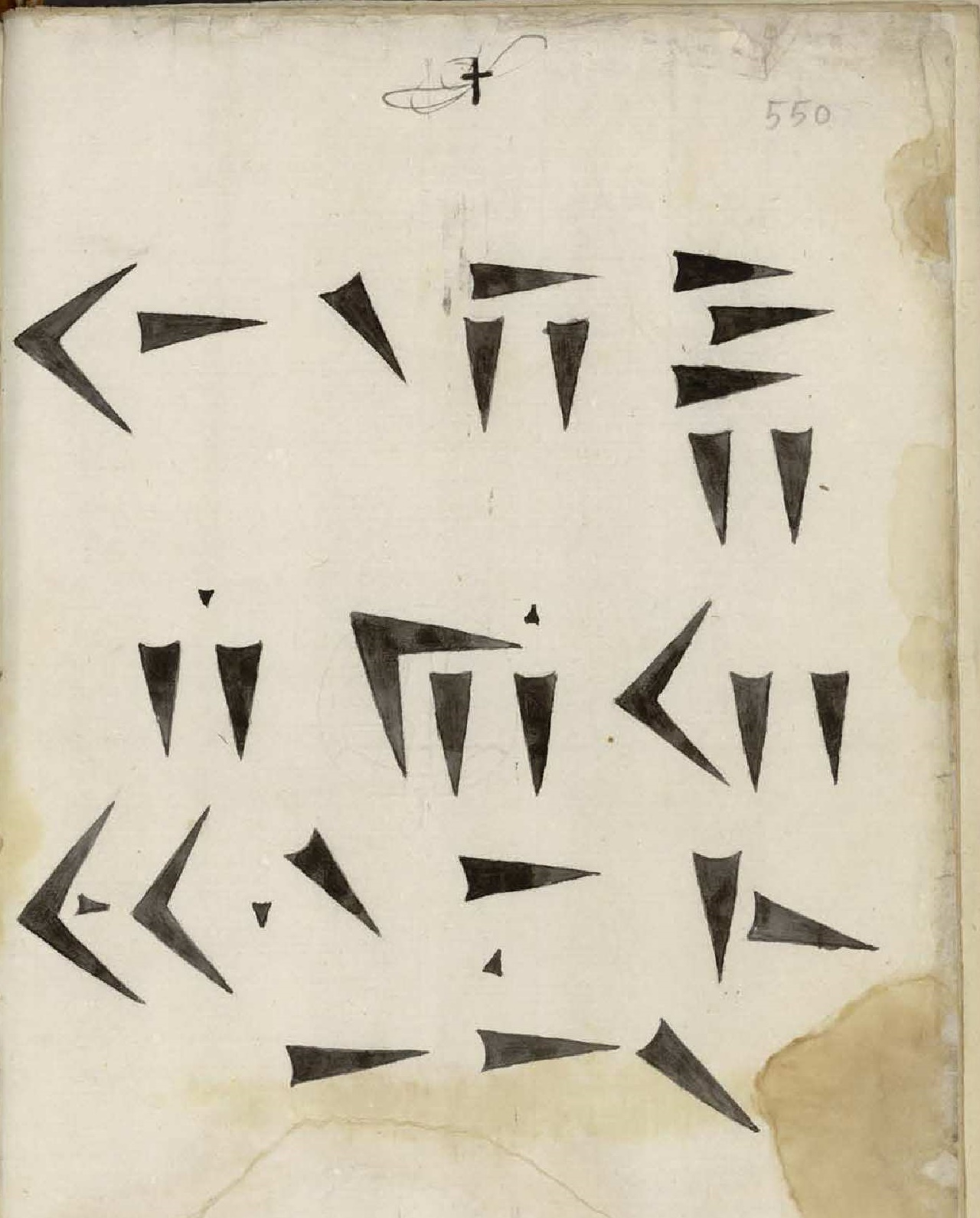
García de Silva Figueroa (1620)

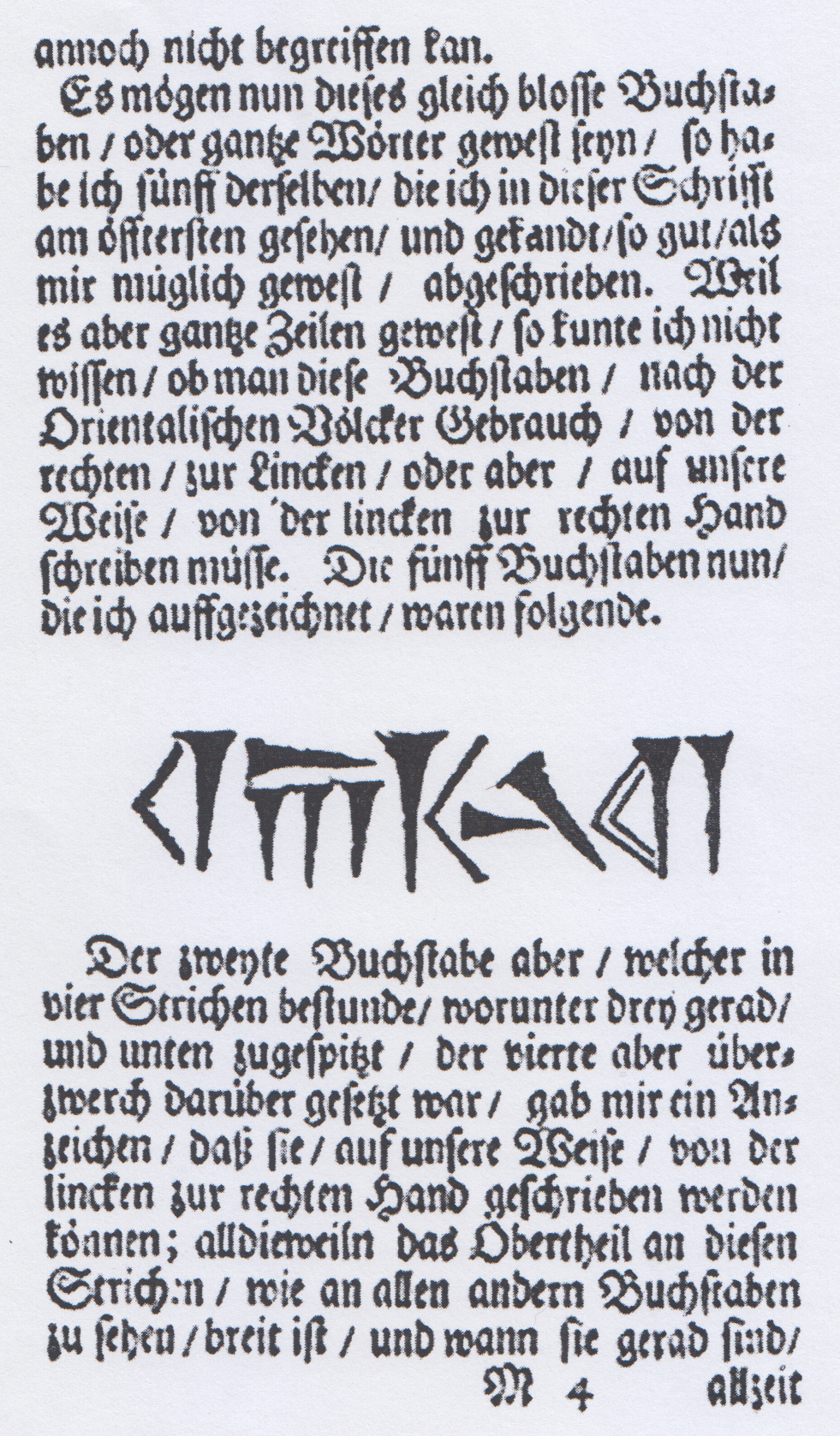
Pietro Della Valle (1621)

The first cuneiform inscriptions published in modern times, both copied from Achaemenid royal inscriptions in Persepolis in the early 17th century. Pietro Della Valle's inscription, today known as XPb, is from the Palace of Xerxes.

The rediscovery and publication of cuneiform took place in the early 17th century, and early conclusions were drawn such as the writing direction and that the Achaemenid royal inscriptions are three different languages, with two different scripts. In 1620, García de Silva Figueroa dated the inscriptions of Persepolis to the Achaemenid period, identified them as Old Persian, and concluded that the ruins were the ancient residence of Persepolis. In 1621, Pietro Della Valle specified the direction of writing from left to right.

In 1762, Jean-Jacques Barthélemy found that an inscription in Persepolis resembled that found on a brick in Babylon. Carsten Niebuhr made the first copies of the inscriptions of Persepolis in 1778 and settled on three different types of writing, which subsequently became known as Niebuhr I, II and III. He was the first to discover the sign for a word division in one of the inscriptions. Oluf Gerhard Tychsen was the first to list 24 phonetic or alphabetic values for the characters in 1798.

The decipherment of cuneiform began with the decipherment of Old Persian cuneiform in 1836. The first cuneiform inscriptions published in modern times were copied from the Achaemenid royal inscriptions in the ruins of Persepolis, with the first complete and accurate copy being published in 1778 by Carsten Niebuhr. Niebuhr's publication was used by Georg Friedrich Grotefend in 1802 to make the first breakthrough, dismissed by academics at the time, – the realization that Niebuhr had published three different languages side by side and the recognition of the word "king". Grotefend was followed by Antoine-Jean Saint-Martin in 1822 in 1823, who was the first to decipher the name Achaemenides and the consonants m and n.

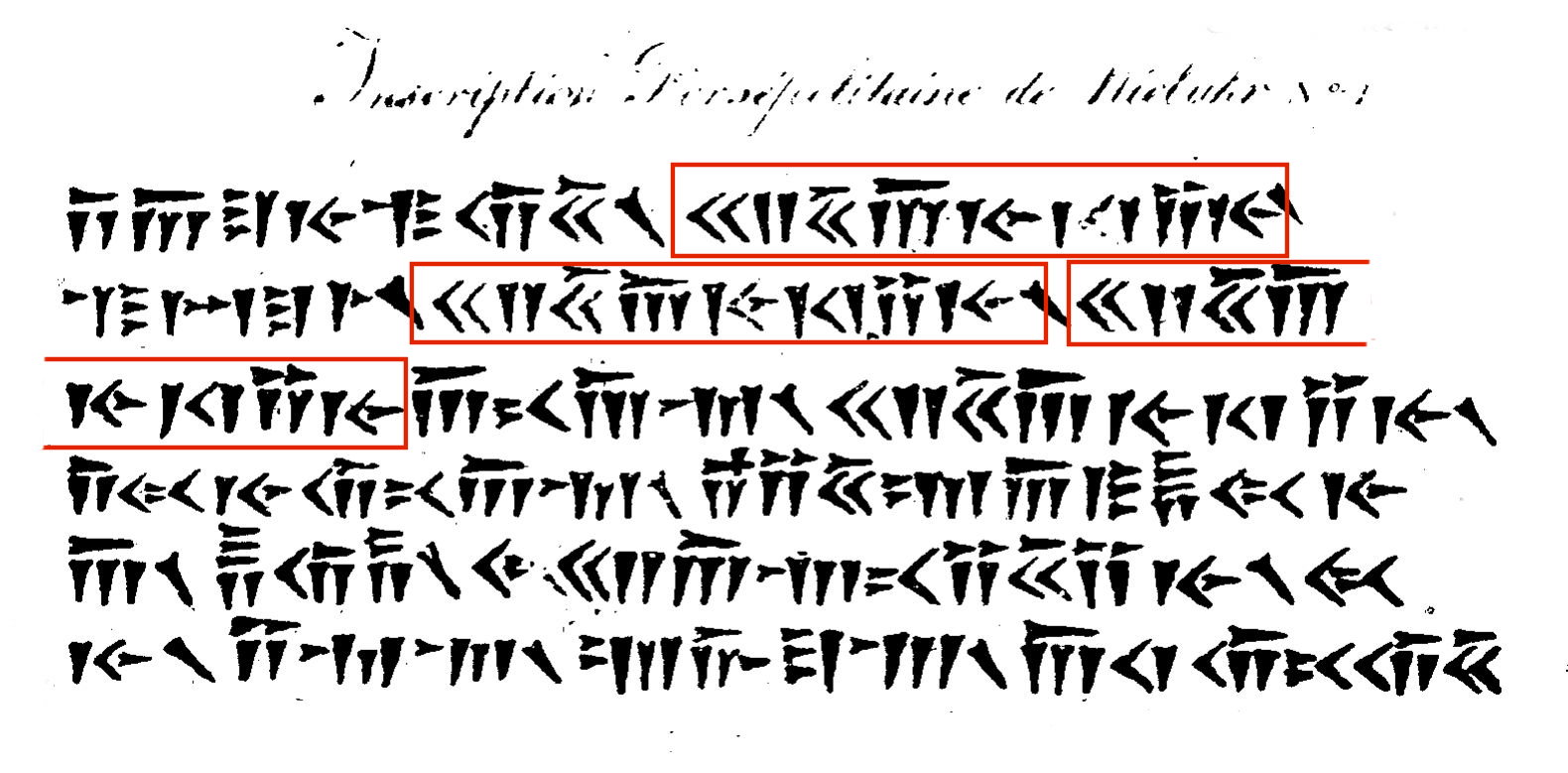
Niebuhr inscription 1, with the suggested words for "King" (𐎧𐏁𐎠𐎹𐎰𐎡𐎹) highlighted, repeated three times. Inscription now known to mean "Darius the Great King, King of Kings, King of countries, son of Hystaspes, an Achaemenian, who built this Palace". Today known as DPa, from the Palace of Darius in Persepolis, above figures of the king and attendants

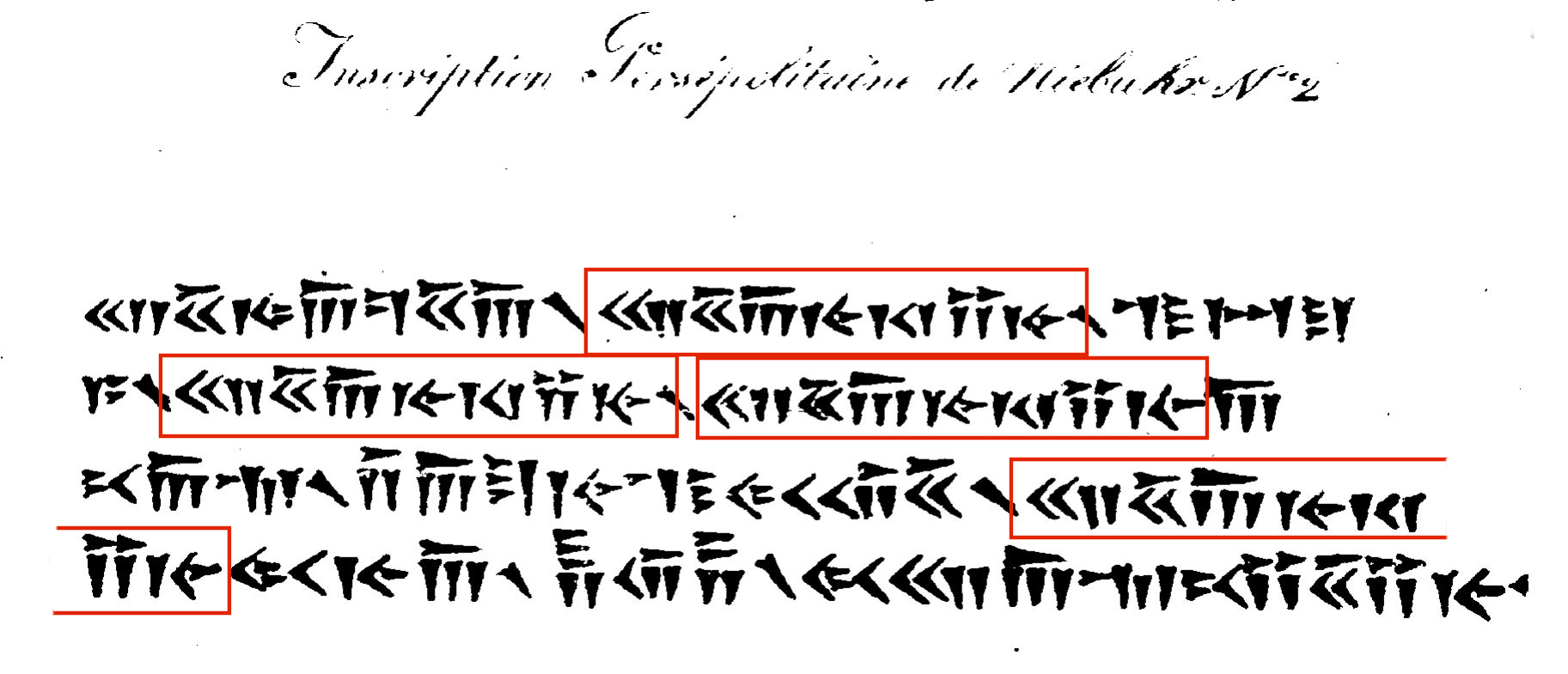
Niebuhr inscription 2, with the suggested words for "King" (𐎧𐏁𐎠𐎹𐎰𐎡𐎹) highlighted, repeated four times. Inscription now known to mean "Xerxes the Great King, King of Kings, son of Darius the King, an Achaemenian". Today known as XPe, the text of fourteen inscriptions in three languages (Old Persian, Elamite, Babylonian) from the Palace of Xerxes in Persepolis.

In a final step, the decipherment of the trilingual Behistun Inscription was completed by Henry Rawlinson and Edward Hincks. Edward Hincks discovered that Old Persian is partly a syllabary.

== Transliteration ==
An extract from the Cyrus Cylinder (lines 15–21), giving the genealogy of Cyrus the Great and an account of his capture of Babylon in 539 BC

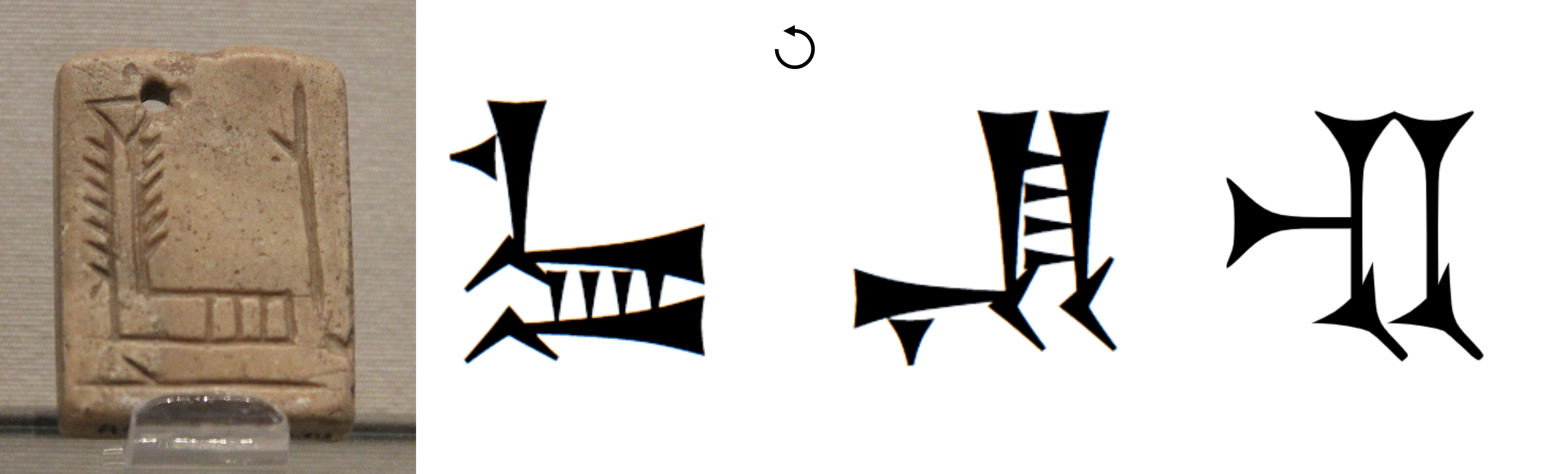
The cuneiform sign "EN", for "Lord" or "Master": the evolution from the pictograph of a throne c. 3000 BC, followed by rotation and then simplification, down to c. 600 BC.

Cylinder of Antiochus I
c. 250 BC

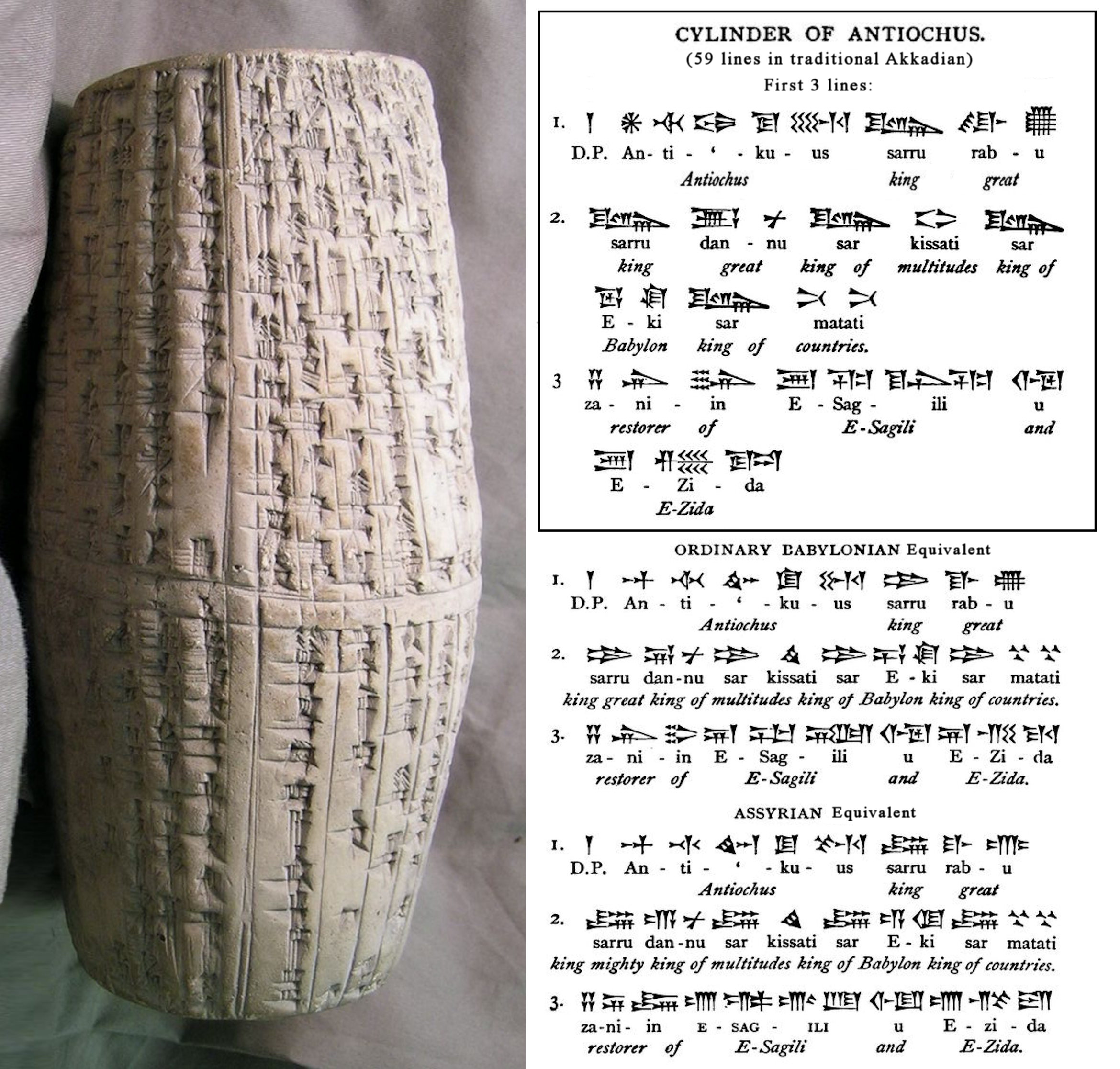
The Antiochus cylinder, written by Antiochus I Soter as great king of kings of Babylon, restorer of the temples E-sagila and E-zida, c. 250 BC. Written in traditional Akkadian (with the same text in Babylonian and Assyrian given here for comparison).

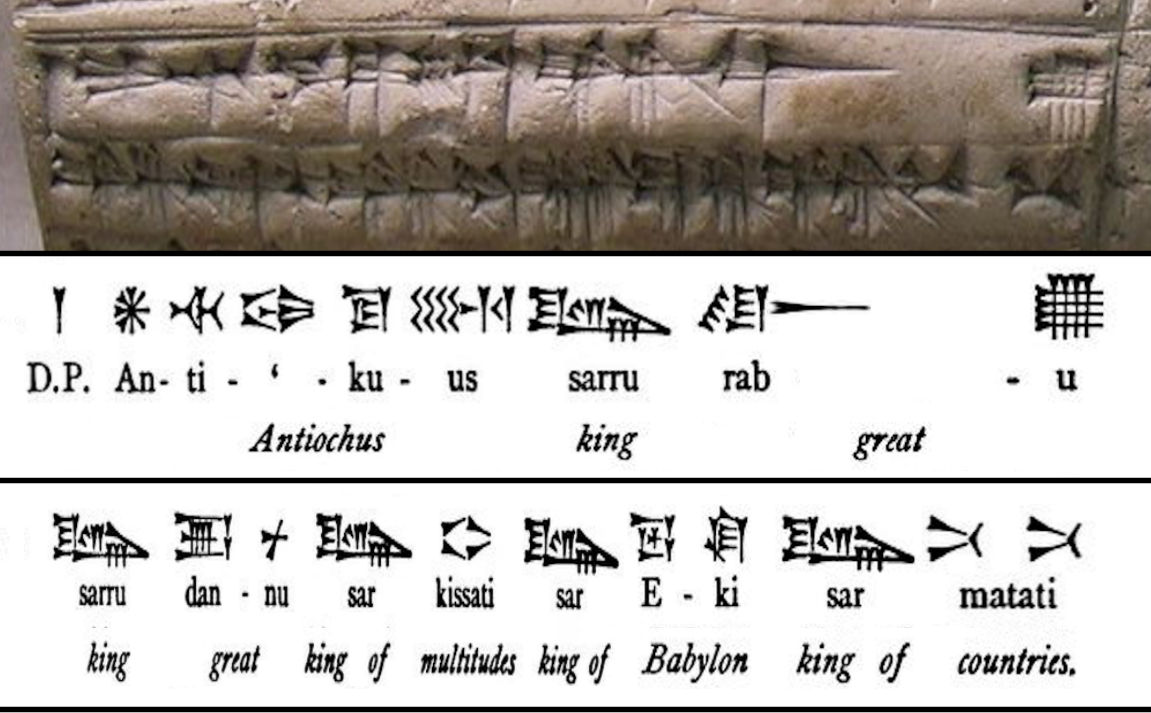
Antiochus I Soter with titles in Akkadian on the cylinder of Antiochus:
"Antiochus, King, Great King, King of multitudes, King of Babylon, King of countries".
Note that while the images above transcribe the Akkadian pronunciation of the text, the actual spelling is highly logographic and would be strictly transliterated as follows, with the logograms (Sumerograms) capitalised and the syllabograms (phonetic signs) italicised:
1. ^{DIŠ}an-ti-ʾu-ku-us LUGAL GAL-ú
2. LUGAL dan-nu LUGAL ŠÁR LUGAL E.KI LUGAL KUR-KUR
3. za-ni-in É.SAG.ÍL ù É.ZI.DA
In Unicode:
1. 𒁹𒀭𒋾𒀪𒆪𒊻𒈗𒃲𒌑
2. 𒈗𒆗𒉡𒈗𒎗𒈗𒂊𒆠𒈗𒆳𒆳
3. 𒍝𒉌𒅔𒂍𒊕𒅍𒅇𒂍𒍣𒁕

Cuneiform has a specific format for transliteration. Because of the script's polyvalence, transliteration requires certain choices of the transliterating scholar, who must decide in the case of each sign which of its several possible meanings is intended in the original document. For example, the sign dingir (𒀭) in a Hittite text may represent either the Hittite syllable an or may be part of an Akkadian phrase, representing the syllable il, it may be a Sumerogram, representing the original Sumerian meaning, 'god' or the determinative for a deity. In transliteration, a different rendition of the same glyph is chosen depending on its role in the present context.

Therefore, a text containing DINGIR (𒀭) and A (𒀀) in succession could be construed to represent the Akkadian words "ana", "ila", god + "a" (the accusative case ending), god + water, or a divine name "A" or Water. Someone transcribing the signs would make the decision how the signs should be read and assemble the signs as "ana", "ila", "Ila" ("god"+accusative case), etc. A transliteration of these signs would separate the signs with dashes "il-a", "an-a", "DINGIR-a" or "^{D}a". This is still easier to read than the original cuneiform, but now the reader is able to trace the sounds back to the original signs and determine if the correct decision was made on how to read them. A transliterated document thus presents the reading preferred by the transliterating scholar as well as an opportunity to reconstruct the original text.

There are differing conventions for transliterating different languages written with Sumero-Akkadian cuneiform. The following conventions see wide use across the different fields:

- To disambiguate between homophones, i.e. between signs pronounced identically, the letters that express the pronunciation of a sign are supplemented with subscript numbers. For example, u_{1} stands for the glyph 𒌋, u_{2} stands for 𒌑, and u_{3} stands for 𒅇, all thought to have been pronounced /u/. No. 1 is usually treated as the default interpretation and not indicated explicitly, so u is equivalent to u_{1}. For the numbers 2 and 3, accent diacritics are often used as well: an acute accent stands for no. 2 and a grave accent for no. 3. Thus, u is equivalent to u_{1} (𒌋), ú is equivalent to u_{2} (𒌑) and ù to u_{3} (𒅇). The sequence of numbering is conventional but essentially arbitrary and a consequence of the history of decipherment.
- As shown above, signs as such are represented in capital letters. The specific reading selected in the transliteration is represented in small letters. Thus, capital letters can be used to indicate a so-called Diri compound, in which a sequence of signs does not stand for a combination of their usual readings, as in the spelling 𒅆𒀀 IGI.A for the word imhur 'foam' given above. Capital letters may also be used to indicate a Sumerogram, for example, KÙ.BABBAR 𒆬𒌓 – Sumerian for "silver" – being used with the intended Akkadian reading kaspum, "silver", or simply a sign sequence of whose reading the editor is uncertain. Naturally, the "real" reading, if it is clear, will be presented in small letters in the transliteration: IGI.A will be rendered as imhur_{4}. An Akkadogram in Hittite is indicated by capital letters as well, but they are italicised: e.g. ME-E transcribes the sign sequence 𒈨𒂊 when the intended reading is Hittite wātar "water", based on Akkadian mê "water (accusative-genitive case)".
- Another convention is that determinatives are written in superscript: thus, the sequence 𒀕𒆠 (the name of the city Uruk) is transliterated as unug^{ki} to show that the second sign, KI, meaning "earth", isn't intended to be pronounced, but only specifies the type of meaning the former sign has. In this case, that it is a place name. A few common determinatives are transliterated with abbreviations: for example, ^{d} represents the sign 𒀭 DINGIR when it serves as an indicator that one or more following signs form the name of a deity, as seen in the transliteration of 𒀭𒂗𒆤 as ^{d}en-líl "Enlil". 𒁹 DIŠ 'one' and 𒊩 MUNUS 'woman' as prefixed determinatives for male and female personal names, uncommon in Sumerian, but subsequently used for some other languages, are often rendered with the abbreviations ^{m} and ^{f} for "masculine" and "feminine".
- In Sumerian transliteration, a multiplication sign ('×') is used to indicate typographic ligatures. For example, the sign 𒅻 NUNDUM, which stands for the word nundum "lip", can also be designated as KA×NUN, which indicates that it is a compound of the signs 𒅗 KA "mouth" and 𒉣 NUN "prince".

Since the Sumerian language has only been widely known and studied by scholars for approximately a century, changes in the accepted reading of Sumerian names have occurred from time to time. Thus the name of a king of Ur, 𒌨𒀭𒇉, read Ur-Bau at one time, was later read as Ur-Engur, and is now read as Ur-Nammu or Ur-Namma; for Lugal-zage-si (𒈗𒍠𒄀𒋛), a king of Uruk, some scholars continued to read Ungal-zaggisi; and so forth. With some names of the older period, there was often uncertainty whether their bearers were Sumerians or Semites. If the former, then their names could be assumed to be read as Sumerian. If they were Semites, the signs for writing their names were probably to be read according to their Semitic equivalents. Though occasionally, Semites might be encountered bearing genuine Sumerian names.

There was doubt whether the signs composing a Semite's name represented a phonetic reading or a logographic compound. Thus, e.g. when inscriptions of a Semitic ruler of Kish, whose name was written 𒌷𒈬𒍑, Uru-mu-ush, were first deciphered, that name was first taken to be logographic because uru mu-ush could be read as "he founded a city" in Sumerian, and scholars accordingly retranslated it back to the original Semitic as Alu-usharshid. It was later recognized that the URU sign (𒌷) can also be read as rí and that the name is that of the Akkadian king Rimush.

== Sign inventories ==
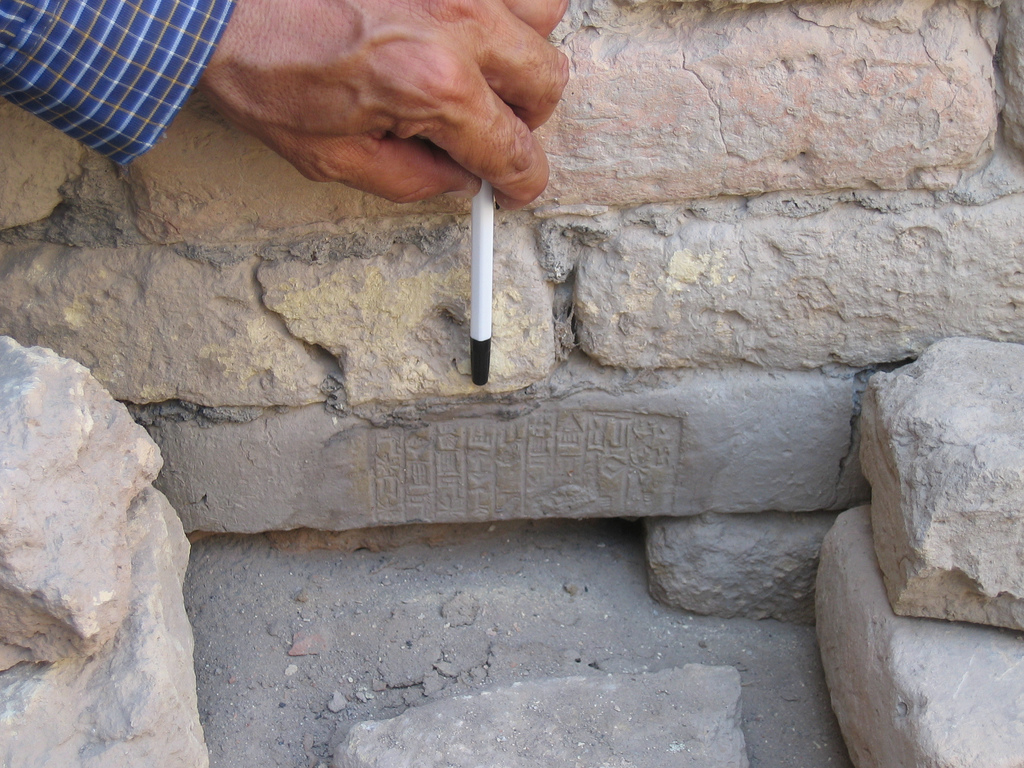
Cuneiform writing in Ur, southern Iraq

The Sumerian cuneiform script had on the order of 1,000 distinct signs, or about 1,500 if variants are included. This number was reduced to about 600 by the 24th century BC and the beginning of Akkadian records. Not all Sumerian signs are used in Akkadian texts, and not all Akkadian signs are used in Hittite.

In 1938 Adam Falkenstein listed 939 signs used in the earliest period, late Uruk, 34th to 31st centuries. With an emphasis on Sumerian forms, Anton Deimel in 1922 listed 870 signs used in the Early Dynastic II period (28th century BC) in the Liste der archaischen Keilschriftzeichen and for the Early Dynastic IIIa period (26th century BC), the Šumerisches Lexikon.

In 1967 Yvonne Rosengarten listed 468 signs used in Sumerian (pre-Sargonian) Lagash. Catherine Mittermayer and Pascal Attinger listed 480 Sumerian forms, written in Isin-Larsa and Old Babylonian times. Regarding Akkadian forms, the standard handbook for many years was by Riekele Borger in Assyrisch-Babylonische Zeichenliste or "ABZ" with 598 signs used in Assyrian and Babylonian writing, recently superseded by Borger's Mesopotamisches Zeichenlexikon or "MesZL" with an expansion to 907 signs, an extension of their Sumerian readings and a new numbering scheme. The introduction of a more cursive style of writing cuneiform (Old Babylonian cursive) in the Old Babylonian period coincided with the expansion of literacy beyond institutional settings, leading to greater variation in writing styles. This shift may have influenced the increasing number of documented signs, as reflected in later sign lists. As writing adapted to new contexts—whether for administrative, literary, or private use—the need for expanded and specialized sign inventories became more apparent.

Signs used in Hittite cuneiform are listed by Emil Forrer, Johannes Friedrich along with Christel Rüster and Erich Neu in Hethitisches Zeichenlexikon or "HZL". The HZL lists a total of 375 signs, many with variants (for example, 12 variants are given for number 123 EGIR).

=== Syllabary ===
The tables below contain the transliteration schemes of Sumero-Akkadian syllabograms.

Akkadian V and VV syllabic glyphs
	Va	Ve	Vi	Vu	aV	eV	iV	uV	
	a = 𒀀 á (a_{2}) = 𒀉 à (a_{3}) = 𒉿 a_{4} = 𒀀𒀭 a_{5} = 𒀝 a_{6} = 𒌋 a_{7} = 𒄩 a_{8} = 𒌨 a_{9} = 𒆹 a_{10} = 𒊷 a_{11} = 𒀭 a_{12} = 𒌓 a_{13} = 𒌗 a_{14} = 𒂍	e = 𒂊 é (e_{2}) = 𒂍 è (e_{3}) = 𒌓𒁺 e_{4} = 𒀀 e_{5} = 𒊩𒌆 e_{6} = 𒋣 e_{7} = 𒅗 e_{8} = 𒌓 e_{10} = 𒉄 e_{11} = 𒇯𒁺 e_{12} = 𒇯𒁽 e_{13} = 𒊩𒆪	i = 𒄿 í (i_{2}) = 𒐊 ì (i_{3}) = 𒉌 i_{4} = 𒉌𒌓 i_{5} = 𒅗 i_{6} = 𒆪 i_{7} = 𒀀𒇉 i_{8} = 𒇉 i_{9} = 𒋖𒄑𒆪 i_{10} = 𒌓𒁺 i_{11} = 𒄭 i_{14} = 𒈬 i_{15} = 𒂊 i_{16} = 𒉿	u = 𒌋 ú (u_{2}) = 𒌑 ù (u_{3}) = 𒅇 u_{4} = 𒌓 u_{5} = 𒄷𒋛 u_{6} = 𒅆𒂍 u_{7} = 𒆠𒈫 u_{8} = 𒇇 u_{9} = 𒂦 u_{10} = 𒁱 u_{11} = 𒄷 u_{12} = 𒌦 u_{13} = 𒄴 u_{14} = 𒌋𒂵 u_{16} = 𒌝 u_{17} = 𒉿 u_{18} = 𒍇 u_{19} = 𒌷 u_{20} = 𒊺 u_{21} = 𒊌 u_{22} = 𒌗 u_{23} = 𒉡	a = 𒀀 á (a_{2}) = 𒀉 à (a_{3}) = 𒉿 a_{4} = 𒀀𒀭 a_{5} = 𒀝 a_{6} = 𒌋 a_{7} = 𒄩 a_{8} = 𒌨 a_{9} = 𒆹 a_{10} = 𒊷 a_{11} = 𒀭 a_{12} = 𒌓 a_{13} = 𒌗 a_{14} = 𒂍	e = 𒂊 é (e_{2}) = 𒂍 è (e_{3}) = 𒌓𒁺 e_{4} = 𒀀 e_{5} = 𒊩𒌆 e_{6} = 𒋣 e_{7} = 𒅗 e_{8} = 𒌓 e_{10} = 𒉄 e_{11} = 𒇯𒁺 e_{12} = 𒇯𒁽 e_{13} = 𒊩𒆪	i = 𒄿 í (i_{2}) = 𒐊 ì (i_{3}) = 𒉌 i_{4} = 𒉌𒌓 i_{5} = 𒅗 i_{6} = 𒆪 i_{7} = 𒀀𒇉 i_{8} = 𒇉 i_{9} = 𒋖𒄑𒆪 i_{10} = 𒌓𒁺 i_{11} = 𒄭 i_{14} = 𒈬 i_{15} = 𒂊 i_{16} = 𒉿	u = 𒌋 ú (u_{2}) = 𒌑 ù (u_{3}) = 𒅇 u_{4} = 𒌓 u_{5} = 𒄷𒋛 u_{6} = 𒅆𒂍 u_{7} = 𒆠𒈫 u_{8} = 𒇇 u_{9} = 𒂦 u_{10} = 𒁱 u_{11} = 𒄷 u_{12} = 𒌦 u_{13} = 𒄴 u_{14} = 𒌋𒂵 u_{16} = 𒌝 u_{17} = 𒉿 u_{18} = 𒍇 u_{19} = 𒌷 u_{20} = 𒊺 u_{21} = 𒊌 u_{22} = 𒌗 u_{23} = 𒉡	
a-			ai = 𒀀𒀀			ea = 𒀀	ia = 𒅀 iá (ia_{2}) = 𒐊 ià (ia_{3}) = 𒉌 ia_{4} = 𒉌𒌓 ia_{5} = 𒈬 ia_{7} = 𒐃 ia_{8} = 𒉿 ia_{9} = 𒀼𒋰 ia_{10} = 𒀀	ua = 𒇇 uá (ua_{2}) = 𒁱 ua_{4} = 𒁦	-a
e-	ea = 𒀀						ie = 𒅀		-e
i-	ia = 𒅀 iá (ia_{2}) = 𒐊 ià (ia_{3}) = 𒉌 ia_{4} = 𒉌𒌓 ia_{5} = 𒈬 ia_{6} = 𒐃 ia_{8} = 𒉿 ia_{9} = 𒀼𒋰 ia_{10} = 𒀀	ie = 𒅀	ii = 𒅀 iì (ii_{3}) = 𒂊	iu = 𒅀 iú (iu_{2}) = 𒉿	ai = 𒀀𒀀		ii = 𒅀 iì (ii_{3}) = 𒂊		-i
u-	ua = 𒇇 uá (ua_{2}) = 𒁱 ua_{4} = 𒁦						iu = 𒅀 iú (iu_{2}) = 𒉿		-u

Akkadian CV and VC syllabic glyphs
	Ca	Ce	Ci	Cu	aC	eC	iC	uC	
ʾ-	ʾa = 𒀪 ʾá (ʾa_{2}) = 𒄴 ʾà (ʾa_{3}) = 𒂍 ʾa_{4} = 𒄩 ʾa_{5} = 𒉌	ʾe = 𒀪 ʾé (ʾe_{2}) = 𒄴	ʾi = 𒀪 ʾí (ʾi_{2}) = 𒄴 ʾì (ʾi_{3}) = 𒄭	ʾu = 𒀪 ʾú (ʾu_{2}) = 𒄴 ʾù (ʾu_{3}) = 𒇇 ʾu_{4} = 𒀀 ʾu_{5} = 𒄷	aʾ = 𒀪 áʾ (aʾ_{2}) = 𒄴 àʾ (aʾ_{3}) = 𒂍	eʾ = 𒀪 éʾ (eʾ_{2}) = 𒄴 èʾ (eʾ_{3}) = 𒂍	iʾ = 𒀪 íʾ (iʾ_{2}) = 𒄴	uʾ = 𒀪 úʾ (uʾ_{2}) = 𒄴 ùʾ (uʾ_{3}) = 𒇇 uʾ_{4} = 𒌔	-ʾ
b-	ba = 𒁀 bá (ba_{2}) = 𒉺 bà (ba_{3}) = 𒌍 ba_{4} = 𒂷 ba_{5} = 𒅮 ba_{6} = 𒌑 ba_{7} = 𒈦 ba_{8} = 𒂦 ba_{9} = 𒁁 ba_{10} = 𒉼 ba_{11} = 𒅤 ba_{13} = 𒈨 ba_{14} = 𒉽 ba_{15} = 𒁇	be = 𒁁 bé (be_{2}) = 𒁉 bè (be_{3}) = 𒉌 be_{4} = 𒁀 be_{5} = 𒆪 be_{6} = 𒉿 be_{7} = 𒉈	bi = 𒁉 bí (bi_{2}) = 𒉈 bì (bi_{3}) = 𒉿 bi_{4} = 𒁁𒁁 bi_{5} = 𒉋 bi_{6} = 𒁀 bi_{7} = 𒆪 bi_{9} = 𒄴	bu = 𒁍 bú (bu_{2}) = 𒆜 bù (bu_{3}) = 𒅤 bu_{4} = 𒇥 bu_{5} = 𒇧, 𒇥 bu_{7} = 𒆪 bu_{8} = 𒁔 bu_{9} = 𒁑 bu_{10} = 𒉽𒉽 bu_{11} = 𒌑 bu_{12} = 𒌋 bu_{13} = 𒅮 bu_{14} = 𒇡 bu_{15} = 𒉻 bu_{16} = 𒉌 bu_{17} = 𒅗	ab = 𒀊 áb (ab_{2}) = 𒀖 àb (ab_{3}) = 𒀜 ab_{4} = 𒀔	eb = 𒅁 éb (eb_{2}) = 𒌈	ib = 𒅁 íb (ib_{2}) = 𒌈	ub = 𒌒 úb (ub_{2}) = 𒂠 ùb (ub_{3}) = 𒀚 ub_{4} = 𒇥 ub_{5} = 𒀛, 𒀚 ub_{6} = 𒀙	-b
d-	da = 𒁕 dá (da_{2}) = 𒋫 dà (da_{3}) = 𒆕 da_{4} = 𒁮 da_{5} = 𒍏 da_{6} = 𒋳 da_{7} = 𒌓 da_{8} = 𒁖 da_{9} = 𒌣 da_{10} = 𒄭 da_{11} = 𒅅 da_{12} = 𒅗 da_{13} = 𒋺	de = 𒁲 dé (de_{2}) = 𒌣 dè (de_{3}) = 𒉈 de_{4} = 𒋼 de_{5} = 𒊑 de_{6} = 𒁺 de_{8} = 𒊹 de_{9} = 𒋾	di = 𒁲 dí (di_{2}) = 𒊹 dì (di_{3}) = 𒋾 di_{4} = 𒌉 di_{5} = 𒊑 di_{6} = 𒁺 di_{7} = 𒉈 di_{8} = 𒌣 di_{11} = 𒁴 di_{12} = 𒋼	du = 𒁺 dú (du_{2}) = 𒌅 dù (du_{3}) = 𒆕 du_{4} = 𒌈 du_{5} = 𒂅 du_{6} = 𒇯 du_{7} = 𒌌 du_{8} = 𒃮/𒂃 du_{9} = 𒁔 du_{10} = 𒄭 du_{11} = 𒅗 du_{12} = 𒌇 du_{13} = 𒌉 du_{14} = 𒇽𒉈, 𒈌 du_{15} = 𒄭𒁁, 𒄰 du_{16} = 𒌚 du_{17} = 𒉈 du_{19} = 𒌣 du_{20} = 𒁕 du_{24} = 𒂄 du_{25} = 𒀲𒀴 du_{26} = 𒋛𒀀	ad = 𒀜 ád (ad_{2}) = 𒄉 àd (ad_{3}) = 𒇼 ad_{4} = 𒍞 ad_{5} = 𒌑𒄉 ad_{6} = 𒇽𒁁, 𒇿, 𒈕	ed = 𒀉 éd (ed_{2}) = 𒌓𒁺 èd (ed_{3}) = 𒇯𒁺 ed_{4} = 𒇯𒁽	id = 𒀉 íd (id_{2}) = 𒀀𒇉 ìd (id_{3}) = 𒇉 id_{4} = 𒌓𒀭𒋀𒆠 id_{5} = 𒀀 id_{6} = 𒀀𒇉𒃲 id_{7} = 𒀀𒇉𒁲 id_{8} = 𒌗 id_{9} = 𒌗𒀭𒋀𒆠	ud = 𒌓 úd (ud_{2}) = 𒀾 ud_{4} = 𒋸 ud_{5} = 𒍚 ud_{6} = 𒌋𒂵	-d
g-	ga = 𒂵 gá (ga_{2}) = 𒂷 gà (ga_{3}) = 𒃷 ga_{4} = 𒃻 ga_{5} = 𒋡 ga_{6} = 𒅍 ga_{7} = 𒅅 ga_{8} = 𒄄 ga_{11} = 𒄯 ga_{12} = 𒈪 ga_{14} = 𒅗 ga_{15} = 𒃮	ge = 𒄀 gé (ge_{2}) = 𒆤 gè (ge_{3}) = 𒁹 ge_{4} = 𒄄 ge_{5} = 𒆠 ge_{6} = 𒈪 ge_{7} = 𒂠 ge_{9} = 𒉈 ge_{10} = 𒉋 ge_{11} = 𒂅 ge_{12} = 𒊩𒆳 ge_{13} = 𒁺 ge_{14} = 𒌋 ge_{15} = 𒀸 ge_{16} = 𒄃 ge_{17} = 𒈪𒉭 ge_{18} = 𒁶 ge_{19} = 𒋝𒋙𒁷, 𒉾 ge_{20} = 𒂵 ge_{21} = 𒆳 ge_{22} = 𒍻 ge_{23} = 𒀹 ge_{24} = 𒀵 ge_{26} = 𒂷 ge_{28} = 𒁨	gi = 𒄀 gí (gi_{2}) = 𒆤 gì (gi_{3}) = 𒁹 gi_{4} = 𒄄 gi_{5} = 𒆠 gi_{6} = 𒈪 gi_{7} = 𒂠 gi_{8} = 𒅆 gi_{9} = 𒉈 gi_{10} = 𒉋 gi_{11} = 𒂅 gi_{12} = 𒊩𒆳 gi_{16} = 𒄃 gi_{17} = 𒈪𒉭 gi_{18} = 𒁶 gi_{25} = 𒂂 gi_{27} = 𒁍	gu = 𒄖 gú (gu_{2}) = 𒄘 gù (gu_{3}) = 𒅗 gu_{4} = 𒄞 gu_{5} = 𒆪 gu_{6} = 𒅘 gu_{7} = 𒅥 gu_{8} = 𒄣 gu_{9} = 𒆰 gu_{10} = 𒈬 gu_{11} = 𒂵 gu_{13} = 𒄯 gu_{14} = 𒆠 gu_{15} = 𒈝 gu_{16} = 𒆍	ag = 𒀝 ág (ag_{2}) = 𒉘 àg (ag_{3}) = 𒋃	eg = 𒅅 ég (eg2) = 𒂊 èb (eg3) = 𒉘	ig = 𒅅 íg (ig_{2}) = 𒂊 ìg (ig_{3}) = 𒉘	ug = 𒊌 úg (ug_{2}) = 𒄊, 𒊊 ùg (ug_{3}) = 𒌦 ug_{4} = 𒌓 ug_{5} = 𒂦 ug_{7} = 𒁁 ug_{8} = 𒈕	-g
ḫ-	ḫa = 𒄩 ḫá (ḫa_{2}) = 𒄭𒀀 ḫà (ḫa_{3}) = 𒌋 ḫa_{4} = 𒄭 ḫa_{5} = 𒌓 ḫa_{6} = 𒄫 ḫa_{8} = 𒋖𒄑	ḫe = 𒄭 ḫé (ḫe_{2}) = 𒃶	ḫi = 𒄭 ḫí (ḫi_{2}) = 𒃶	ḫu = 𒄷 ḫú (ḫu_{2}) = 𒆭 ḫù (ḫu_{3}) = 𒌋 ḫu_{4} = 𒄯 ḫu_{5} = 𒈝	aḫ = 𒄴 áḫ (aḫ_{2}) = 𒋀 àḫ (aḫ_{3}) = 𒌓 aḫ_{4} = 𒀪 aḫ_{5} = 𒀉 aḫ_{6} = 𒌔	eḫ = 𒄴 éḫ (eḫ_{2}) = 𒀪 èḫ (eḫ_{3}) = 𒆪𒆪	iḫ = 𒄴 íḫ (iḫ_{2}) = 𒀪	uḫ = 𒄴 úḫ (uḫ_{2}) = 𒌔 ùḫ (uḫ_{3}) = 𒆵 uḫ_{4} = 𒅜 uḫ_{5} = 𒀪 uḫ_{6} = 𒅎𒋙 uḫ_{7} = 𒌋𒆕	-ḫ
k-	ka = 𒅗 ká (ka_{2}) = 𒆍 kà (ka_{3}) = 𒂵 ka_{4} = 𒋡 ka_{5} = 𒈜 ka_{6} = 𒋝𒋙𒁷, 𒉾 ka_{7} = 𒁽 ka_{8} = 𒁉 ka_{9} = 𒋃 ka_{10} = 𒈜𒀀 ka_{11} = 𒋼𒀀 ka_{13} = 𒄰, 𒄰 ka_{14} = 𒍪 ka_{15} = 𒆕 ka_{16} = 𒃶	ke = 𒆠 ké (ke_{2}) = 𒄀 kè (ke3) = 𒀝 ke_{4} = 𒆤	ki = 𒆠 kí (ki_{2}) = 𒄀 kì (ki_{3}) = 𒀝 ki_{4} = 𒆤 ki_{6} = 𒍪 ki_{7} = 𒆕 ki_{8} = 𒄄	ku = 𒆪 kú (ku_{2}) = 𒅥 kù (ku_{3}) = 𒆬 ku_{4} = 𒆭 ku_{5} = 𒋻 ku_{6} = 𒄩 ku_{7} = 𒆯 ku_{8} = 𒄖 ku_{9} = 𒆰 ku_{10} = 𒈪 ku_{11} = 𒆠 ku_{13} = 𒄣 ku_{14} = 𒆲 ku_{15} = 𒄞 ku_{16} = 𒉈 ku_{17} = 𒄫	ak = 𒀝 àk (ak_{3}) = 𒋃	ek = 𒅅	ik = 𒅅	uk = 𒊌	-k
l-	la = 𒆷 lá (la_{2}) = 𒇲 là (la_{3}) = 𒉡 la_{4} = 𒁺𒁺 la_{5} = 𒇳 la_{6} = 𒆗 la_{7} = 𒌓 la_{8} = 𒂔 la_{10} = 𒋃 la_{12} = 𒇴	le = 𒇷 lé (le_{2}) = 𒉌 lè (le_{3}) = 𒅆 le_{4} = 𒀭 le_{8} = 𒀖 le_{9} = 𒉈 le_{10} = 𒁕	li = 𒇷 lí (li_{2}) = 𒉌 lì (li_{3}) = 𒅆 li_{5} = 𒊭 li_{6} = 𒃶 li_{7} = 𒌨 li_{8} = 𒀖 li_{9} = 𒉈 li_{11} = 𒉣 li_{12} = 𒇺 li_{13} = 𒉋	lu = 𒇻 lú (lu_{2}) = 𒇽 lù (lu_{3}) = 𒈖 lu_{4} = 𒈝 lu_{5} = 𒈜 lu_{6} = 𒌨 lu_{7} = 𒍇 lu_{8} = 𒌷 lu_{9} = 𒉺	al = 𒀠 ál (al_{2}) = 𒀩 àl (al_{3}) = 𒃷 al_{4} = 𒌓 al_{6} = 𒈤 al_{8} = 𒌷 al_{9} = 𒅋	el = 𒂖 él (el_{2}) = 𒅋 èl (el_{3}) = 𒀭 el_{4} = 𒅌	il = 𒅋 íl (il_{2}) = 𒅍 ìl (il_{3}) = 𒀭 il_{4} = 𒁹 il_{5} = 𒂖 il_{6} = 𒀧 il_{8} = 𒅌 il_{9} = 𒇸 il_{10} = 𒀠, 𒅋	ul = 𒌌 úl (ul_{2}) = 𒉡 ùl (ul_{3}) = 𒁉𒑖 ul_{4} = 𒄉 ul_{5} = 𒂬 ul_{6} = 𒌓 ul_{7} = 𒋗𒁍 ul_{8} = 𒃷	-l
m-	ma = 𒈠 má (ma_{2}) = 𒈣 mà (ma_{3}) = 𒂷 ma_{4} = 𒊬 ma_{5} = 𒅡 ma_{6} = 𒈨 ma_{7} = 𒈦 ma_{8} = 𒅿 ma_{9} = 𒉿 ma_{10} = 𒎙	me = 𒈨 mé (me_{2}) = 𒈪 mè (me_{3}) = 𒅠, 𒀞 me_{4} = 𒁁 me_{5} = 𒀀 me_{6} = 𒀝 me_{7} = 𒃙 me_{8} = 𒉿 me_{9} = 𒇞 me_{10} = 𒅎 me_{11} = 𒀟	mi = 𒈪 mí (mi_{2}) = 𒊩 mì (mi_{3}) = 𒈨 mi_{4} = 𒃞 mi_{5} = 𒉿	mu = 𒈬 mú (mu_{2}) = 𒊬 mù (mu_{3}) = 𒅡 mu_{4} = 𒌆 mu_{5} = 𒉌 mu_{6} = 𒉺 mu_{7} = 𒅲 mu_{8} = 𒃻 mu_{9} = 𒄑 mu_{10} = 𒊩 mu_{11} = 𒅿 mu_{12} = 𒄷𒄭 mu_{13} = 𒆀 mu_{14} = 𒀀	am = 𒄠 ám (am_{2}) = 𒉘 àm (am_{3}) = 𒀀𒀭 am_{4} = 𒃘 am_{5} = 𒃣 am_{6} = 𒀭 am_{7} = 𒉿	em = 𒅎 èm (em_{3}) = 𒉘 em_{4} = 𒅴	im = 𒅎 ím (im_{2}) = 𒁽 ìm (im_{3}) = 𒉘 im_{5} = 𒁼 im_{6} = 𒁺 im_{7} = 𒅖𒀀𒋤	um = 𒌝 úm (um_{2}) = 𒌓	-m
n-	na = 𒈾 ná (na_{2}) = 𒈿 nà (na_{3}) = 𒀝 na_{4} = 𒉌𒌓 na_{5} = 𒊭 na_{6} = 𒇽 na_{7} = 𒉆 na_{8} = 𒅘	ne = 𒉈 né (ne_{2}) = 𒉌 nè (ne_{3}) = 𒄊/𒊊 ne_{4} = 𒋙𒉈 ne_{5} = 𒆠𒉈 ne_{6} = 𒈾 ne_{7} = 𒈿 ne_{8} = 𒉋	ni = 𒉌 ní (ni_{2}) = 𒅎 nì (ni_{3}) = 𒃻 ni_{4} = 𒊩𒌆 ni_{5} = 𒉈 ni_{6} = 𒆸𒆸 ni_{7} = 𒉏 ni_{8} = 𒇷 ni_{9} = 𒌋𒌓𒆤 ni_{10} = 𒆸	nu = 𒉡 nú (nu_{2}) = 𒈿 nù (nu_{3}) = 𒉏 nu_{4} = 𒈝 nu_{5} = 𒆰 nu_{6} = 𒉣 nu_{7} = 𒀕 nu_{8} = 𒈾 nu_{9} = 𒇷 nu_{10} = 𒆪 nu_{11} = 𒋓 nu_{12} = 𒇻/𒁳 nu_{13} = 𒄴	an = 𒀭 án (an_{2}) = 𒄒	en = 𒂗 én (en_{2}) = 𒋙𒀭, 𒌋𒀭 èn (en_{3}) = 𒇷 en_{4} = 𒅗 en_{5} = 𒉺𒋼 en_{6} = 𒅔 en_{7} = 𒍠 en_{8} = 𒊭	in = 𒅔 in_{4} = 𒂗 in_{5} = 𒊩𒌆 in_{6} = 𒀸	un = 𒌦 ún (un_{2}) = 𒌋 ùn (un_{3}) = 𒂦 un_{4} = 𒂬 un_{5} = 𒌓	-n
p-	pa = 𒉺 pá (pa_{2}) = 𒁀 pà (pa_{3}) = 𒅆𒊒 pa_{4} = 𒉽 pa_{5} = 𒉽𒂊 pa_{6} = 𒉽𒅖 pa_{7} = 𒄷 pa_{8} = 𒋃 pa_{9} = 𒊷 pa_{10} = 𒅆 pa_{11} = 𒃶 pa_{12} = 𒉿	pe = 𒉿 pé (pe_{2}) = 𒁉 pè (pe_{3}) = 𒁁 pe_{4} = 𒅗 pe_{5} = 𒉈	pi = 𒉿 pí (pi_{2}) = 𒁉 pì (pi_{3}) = 𒁁 pi_{4} = 𒅗 pi_{5} = 𒉈 pi_{6} = 𒉋 pi_{7} = 𒂺 pi8 = 𒁍	pu = 𒁍 pú (pu_{2}) = 𒇥 pù (pu_{3}) = 𒅤 pu_{4} = 𒅤 pu_{6} = 𒇀 pu_{11} = 𒌑	ap = 𒀊 áp (ap_{2}) = 𒀖 àp (ap_{3}) = 𒀜	ep = 𒅁 ép (ep_{2}) = 𒌈	ip = 𒅁 íp (ip_{2}) = 𒌈	up = 𒌒 úp (up_{2}) = 𒂠	-p
q-	qa = 𒋡 qá (qa_{2}) = 𒂵 qà (qa_{3}) = 𒅗 qa_{4} = 𒋗𒈫 qa_{6} = 𒆕	qe = 𒆥 qé (qe_{2}) = 𒆠 qè (qe_{3}) = 𒄀 qe_{4} = 𒄄	qi = 𒆥 qí (qi_{2}) = 𒆠 qì (qi_{3}) = 𒄀 qi_{4} = 𒄄 qi_{5} = 𒆤 qi_{6} = 𒆕	qu = 𒄣 qú (qu_{2}) = 𒆪 qù (qu_{3}) = 𒄖 qu_{5} = 𒆬 qu_{6} = 𒄘 qu_{7} = 𒄞	aq = 𒀝	eq = 𒅅	iq = 𒅅	uq = 𒊌 uq_{5} = 𒂦	-q
r-	ra = 𒊏 rá (ra_{2}) = 𒁺 rà (ra_{3}) = 𒌓 ra_{4} = 𒋥 ra_{5} = 𒁍 ra_{6} = 𒀝	re = 𒊑 ré (re_{2}) = 𒌷 rè (re_{3}) = 𒆸 re_{6} = 𒁺 re_{7} = 𒁻 re_{12} = 𒆕	ri = 𒊑 rí (ri_{2}) = 𒌷 rì (ri_{3}) = 𒆸 ri_{4} = 𒍮 ri_{5} = 𒉪 ri_{6} = 𒁺 ri_{8} = 𒈶 ri_{9} = 𒈕, 𒈗𒆚 ri_{10} = 𒂔 ri_{12} = 𒆕	ru = 𒊒 rú (ru_{2}) = 𒆕 rù (ru_{3}) = 𒀸 ru_{4} = 𒍍 ru_{5} = 𒌌 ru_{6} = 𒂔 ru_{7} = 𒌨 ru_{8} = 𒋭 ru_{9} = 𒌷 ru_{10} = 𒋽 ru_{11} = 𒌾 ru_{12} = 𒂗 ru_{13} = 𒂘	ar = 𒅈 ár (ar_{2}) = 𒌒 àr (ar_{3}) = 𒄯 ar_{5} = 𒃵	er = 𒅕 ér (er_{2}) = 𒀀𒅆 èr (er_{3}) = 𒀴 er_{4} = 𒌷 er_{6} = 𒀅 er_{10} = 𒁺 er_{13} = 𒈁	ir = 𒅕 ír (ir_{2}) = 𒀀𒅆 ìr (ir_{3}) = 𒀴 ir_{4} = 𒌷 ir_{5} = 𒄯 ir_{6} = 𒀅 ir_{7} = 𒆜 ir_{9} = 𒄊 ir_{10} = 𒁺 ir_{11} = 𒀵 ir_{13} = 𒅕 ir_{17} = 𒂆	ur = 𒌨 úr (ur_{2}) = 𒌫 ùr (ur_{3}) = 𒃡 ur_{4} = 𒌴 ur_{5} = 𒄯 ur_{6} = 𒌌 ur_{7} = 𒉞 ur_{9} = 𒌲 ur_{10} = 𒌵 ur_{11} = 𒀳 ur_{12} = 𒋽 ur_{13} = 𒊐𒃲 ur_{14} = 𒃣	-r
s-	sa = 𒊓 sá (sa_{2}) = 𒁲 sà (sa_{3}) = 𒍝 sa_{4} = 𒄷𒈿, 𒄷𒄭𒈿 sa_{5} = 𒋛𒀀 sa_{6} = 𒊷 sa_{7} = 𒅊 sa_{8} = 𒀭 sa_{9} = 𒈦 sa_{10} = 𒉛 sa_{11} = 𒋜 sa_{12} = 𒊕 sa_{13} = 𒅆𒂟 sa_{14} = 𒆗 sa_{15} = 𒃻 sa_{16} = 𒌓 sa_{17} = 𒋙𒉀 sa_{18} = 𒁉 sa_{19} = 𒊮 sa_{20} = 𒊭 sa_{21} = 𒊾	se = 𒋛 sé (se_{2}) = 𒍣 sè (se_{3}) = 𒋧 se_{9} = 𒈻 se_{10} = 𒍝𒈹𒁲 se_{11} = 𒋝 se_{12} = 𒅊 se_{20} = 𒍢 se_{24} = 𒈺, 𒀀𒈹 se_{25} = 𒈹𒁲 se_{26} = 𒀀𒈹𒁲 se_{27} = 𒈹 se_{28} = 𒈽	si = 𒋛 sí (si_{2}) = 𒍣 sì (si_{3}) = 𒋧 si_{4} = 𒋜 si_{5} = 𒅆𒂠 si_{6} = 𒇻 si_{7} = 𒌣 si_{8} = 𒁲 si_{11} = 𒋝 si_{12} = 𒅊 si_{13} = 𒉆 si_{14} = 𒂁 si_{15} = 𒊬 si_{16} = 𒋝 si_{17} = 𒅆 si_{18} = 𒅲, 𒅝 si_{19} = 𒆉 si_{20} = 𒍢 si_{21} = 𒆗 si_{22} = 𒄀, 𒆬 si_{23} = 𒄢	su = 𒋢 sú (su_{2}) = 𒍪 sù (su_{3}) = 𒋤 su_{4} = 𒋜 su_{5} = 𒆪 su_{6} = 𒅾 su_{7} = 𒇭 su_{8} = 𒁻 su_{9} = 𒋜𒀀 su_{10} = 𒈽 su_{11} = 𒅗 su_{12} = 𒋧, 𒋛 su_{13} = 𒁍 su_{14} = 𒍮 su_{15} = 𒁉 su_{16} = 𒁔 su_{17} = 𒂄 su_{18} = 𒂅 su_{19} = 𒁺𒁺 su_{20} = 𒋆	as = 𒊍 ás (as_{2}) = 𒀾 às (as_{3}) = 𒀸 as_{4} = 𒆹 as_{5} = 𒋓 as_{6} = 𒄱	es = 𒄑 és (es_{2}) = 𒌍 ès (es_{3}) = 𒀊 es_{5} = 𒅖	is = 𒄑 ís (is_{2}) = 𒅖 ìs (is_{3}) = 𒀊 is_{5} = 𒌍	us = 𒊻 ús (us_{2}) = 𒍑 ùs (us_{3}) = 𒍚 us_{4} = 𒊍 us_{5} = 𒇇	-s
ṣ-	ṣa = 𒍝 ṣà (ṣa_{3}) = 𒀭	ṣe = 𒍢 ṣé (ṣe_{2}) = 𒍣	ṣi = 𒍢 ṣí (ṣi_{2}) = 𒍣 ṣì (ṣi_{3}) = 𒋛 ṣi_{4} = 𒂠	ṣu = 𒍮 ṣú (ṣu_{2}) = 𒍪	aṣ = 𒊍 áṣ (aṣ_{2}) = 𒀾 àṣ (aṣ_{3}) = 𒀸	eṣ = 𒄑 èṣ (eṣ_{3}) = 𒀊	iṣ = 𒄑 íṣ (iṣ_{2}) = 𒅖 ìṣ (iṣ_{3}) = 𒀊	uṣ = 𒊻 úṣ (uṣ_{2}) = 𒍑 uṣ_{4} = 𒊍	-ṣ
ś-	śa = 𒊓 śá (śa_{2}) = 𒁲	śe = 𒋛 śé (śe_{2}) = 𒋝	śi = 𒋛 śí (śi_{2}) = 𒋜 śì (śi_{3}) = 𒋝	śu = 𒋢 śú (śu_{2}) = 𒋜 śù (śu_{3}) = 𒋤	aś = 𒀾		iś = 𒅖 iś_{7} = 𒀊	uś = 𒍑	-ś
š-	ša = 𒊭 šá (ša_{2}) = 𒃻 šà (ša_{3}) = 𒊮 ša_{4} = 𒁺 ša_{5} = 𒀝 ša_{6} = 𒊷 ša_{7} = 𒊑 ša_{8} = 𒊬 ša_{9} = 𒄣 ša_{10} = 𒊓 ša_{11} = 𒇽 ša_{12} = 𒊩 ša_{13} = 𒊹 ša_{14} = 𒂷 ša_{15} = 𒅆𒂟 ša_{16} = 𒂠 ša_{17} = 𒅇 ša_{21} = 𒁉 ša_{22} = 𒄷𒈿, 𒄷𒄭𒈿 ša_{23} = 𒁈 ša_{24} = 𒊕 ša_{25} = 𒌑	še = 𒊺 šé (še_{2}) = 𒋛 šè (še_{3}) = 𒂠 še_{4} = 𒈻 še_{5} = 𒍝𒈹𒁲 še_{6} = 𒉈 še_{7} = 𒀀𒀭 še_{8} = 𒋁 še_{9} = 𒋙𒀭, 𒌋𒀭, 𒁇𒀭 še_{10} = 𒆪 še_{11} = 𒈜 še_{12} = 𒈺, 𒀀𒈹 še_{13} = 𒁺 še_{14} = 𒋃 še_{15} = 𒌁 še_{16} = 𒋀 še_{17} = 𒈹𒁲 še_{18} = 𒀀𒈹𒁲 še_{19} = 𒋧 še_{20} = 𒅆, 𒂠 še_{21} = 𒄷𒈿 še_{22} = 𒂞 še_{23} = 𒈹 še_{24} = 𒈽 še_{25} = 𒆂 še_{26} = 𒅝 še_{27} = 𒋞 še_{28} = 𒅗 še_{29} = 𒈂, 𒇽𒃸	ši = 𒅆 ší (ši_{2}) = 𒋛 šì (ši_{3}) = 𒋝 ši_{4} = 𒂠 ši_{5} = 𒆪 ši_{6} = 𒋆 ši_{7} = 𒅊	šu = 𒋗 šú (šu_{2}) = 𒋙 šù (šu_{3}) = 𒂠 šu_{4} = 𒌋 šu_{5} = 𒇟 šu_{6} = 𒇠 šu_{7} = 𒃻 šu_{10} = 𒈬 šu_{11} = 𒋢 šu_{12} = 𒆃 šu_{13} = 𒁉 šu_{14} = 𒋳 šu_{15} = 𒍮 šu_{16} = 𒌋𒌓	aš = 𒀸 áš (aš_{2}) = 𒀾 àš (aš_{3}) = 𒐋 aš_{4} = 𒐄 aš_{5} = 𒋁𒋦 aš_{6} = 𒋁, 𒀊 aš_{7} = 𒋓 aš_{8} = 𒄱 aš_{9} = 𒑀 aš_{10} = 𒁹 aš_{11} = 𒀹	eš = 𒌍 éš (eš_{2}) = 𒂠 èš (eš_{3}) = 𒀊 eš_{4} = 𒁹 eš_{5} = 𒐈 eš_{6} = 𒐁 eš_{7} = 𒑘 eš_{8} = 𒆜 eš_{9} = 𒀀𒅆 eš_{10} = 𒀀 eš_{11} = 𒊑 eš_{12} = 𒉊 eš_{13} = 𒉉 eš_{15} = 𒅖 eš_{16} = 𒐺 eš_{17} = 𒈨𒌍 eš_{18} = 𒀹 eš_{19} = 𒄑 eš_{20} = 𒀸 eš_{21} = 𒐻 eš_{22} = 𒇵 eš_{23} = 𒀼	iš = 𒅖 íš (iš_{2}) = 𒆜 ìš (iš_{3}) = 𒌍𒌍 iš_{4} = 𒁹 iš_{5} = 𒅗 iš_{6} = 𒄑 iš_{7} = 𒀊 iš_{8} = 𒀹 iš_{9} = 𒂠 iš_{10} = 𒍑 iš_{11} = 𒇵 iš_{12} = 𒇴	uš = 𒍑 úš (uš_{2}) = 𒁁 ùš (uš_{3}) = 𒃣 uš_{4} = 𒌆 uš_{5} = 𒉦 uš_{6} = 𒉥 uš_{7} = 𒅲 uš_{8} = 𒀳 uš_{10} = 𒊻 uš_{11} = 𒅜 uš_{15} = 𒅜 uš_{16} = 𒋛𒀀 uš_{17} = 𒄮 uš_{18} = 𒌍 uš_{19} = 𒄑	-š
t-	ta = 𒋫 tá (ta_{2}) = 𒁕 tà (ta_{3}) = 𒋳 ta_{4} = 𒁮 ta_{5} = 𒌓 ta_{6} = 𒋺 ta_{7} = 𒉿 ta_{8} = 𒄭	te = 𒋼 té (te_{2}) = 𒊹 tè (te_{3}) = 𒉁 te_{4} = 𒉈 te_{5} = 𒌆 te_{6} = 𒋃 te_{8} = 𒀉 te_{9} = 𒋾 te_{10} = 𒁲 te_{11} = 𒉿	ti = 𒋾 tí (ti_{2}) = 𒊹 tì (ti_{3}) = 𒁴 ti_{4} = 𒁲 ti_{5} = 𒁁 ti_{7} = 𒋼 ti_{8} = 𒀉 ti_{9} = 𒉈 ti_{10} = 𒌗	tu = 𒌅 tú (tu_{2}) = 𒌓 tù (tu_{3}) = 𒁺 tu_{4} = 𒌈 tu_{5} = 𒋗𒉀 tu_{6} = 𒅲 tu_{7} = 𒄰, 𒄰 tu_{8} = 𒉏 tu_{9} = 𒌆 tu_{10} = 𒄽 tu_{11} = 𒄸 tu_{12} = 𒌇 tu_{13} = 𒇧 tu_{14} = 𒋃 tu_{15} = 𒅎 tu_{16} = 𒂀 tu_{17} = 𒀀𒋗𒉀 tu_{18} = 𒂅 tu_{19} = 𒌉 tu_{20} = 𒆕 tu_{21} = 𒇯 tu_{22} = 𒉀 tu_{23} = 𒉂 tu_{24} = 𒂃, 𒃮 tu_{25} = 𒉐	at = 𒀜 át (at_{2}) = 𒄉 at_{6} = 𒇽𒁁, 𒇿	et = 𒀉	it = 𒀉 ít (it_{2}) = 𒀀𒇉 it_{4} = 𒌓𒀭𒋀𒆠 it_{9} = 𒌗𒀭𒋀𒆠	ut = 𒌓 út (ut_{2}) = 𒀾 ut_{4} = 𒋸, 𒋳𒌆 ut_{5} = 𒍚 ut_{6} = 𒌋𒂵	-t
ṭ-	ṭa = 𒁕 ṭá (ṭa_{2}) = 𒋫 ṭà (ṭa_{3}) = 𒄭 ṭa_{4} = 𒁮	ṭe = 𒁲 ṭé (ṭe_{5}) = 𒊹 ṭè (ṭe_{3}) = 𒉈 ṭe_{4} = 𒋼 ṭe_{5} = 𒌣 ṭe_{6} = 𒋾	ṭi = 𒁲 ṭí (ṭi_{2}) = 𒊹 ṭì (ṭi_{3}) = 𒋾 ṭi_{4} = 𒋼 ṭi_{5} = 𒉈 ṭi_{6} = 𒉿	ṭu = 𒂅 ṭú (ṭu_{2}) = 𒌅 ṭù (ṭu_{3}) = 𒁺 ṭu_{4} = 𒌈 ṭu_{5} = 𒂃 ṭu_{6} = 𒅗	aṭ = 𒀜 áṭ (aṭ_{2}) = 𒄉	eṭ = 𒀉	iṭ = 𒀉	uṭ = 𒌓	-ṭ
w-	wa = 𒉿 wá (wa_{2}) = 𒁀 wà (wa_{3}) = 𒌑 wa_{4} = 𒊀 wa_{6} = 𒈠	we = 𒉿 wé (we_{2}) = 𒊄	wi = 𒉿 wí (wi_{2}) = 𒊅 wi_{4} = 𒈪 wi_{5} = 𒃾	wu = 𒉿 wú (wu_{2}) = 𒊇 wù (wu_{3}) = 𒊈 wu_{4} = 𒈬	aw = 𒉿	ew = 𒉿	iw = 𒉿	uw = 𒉿	-w
y- (j-)	ya / ja = 𒉿	ye / je = 𒉿	yi / ji = 𒉿 yí / jí (yi_{2} / ji_{2}) = 𒅀 yì / jì (yi_{3} / ji_{3}) = 𒂊	yu / ju = 𒉿	ay / aj = 𒀀𒀀				-y (-j)
z-	za = 𒍝 zá (za_{2}) = 𒉌𒌓 zà (za_{3}) = 𒍠 za_{4} = 𒉣 za_{5} = 𒀭	ze = 𒍣 zé (ze_{2}) = 𒍢 zè (ze_{3}) = 𒂠	zi = 𒍣 zí (zi_{2}) = 𒍢 zì (zi_{3}) = 𒂠 zi_{4} = 𒀓 zi_{7} = 𒆠𒉈 zi_{8} = 𒆗	zu = 𒍪 zú (zu_{2}) = 𒅗 zù (zu_{3}) = 𒍮 zu_{4} = 𒁁 zu_{5} = 𒉙 zu_{6} = 𒋤 zu_{7} = 𒂄 zu_{8} = 𒆛 zu_{9} = 𒆉	az = 𒊍 áz (az_{2}) = 𒀾 àz (az_{3}) = 𒀸	ez = 𒄑 éz (ez_{2}) = 𒌍 èz (ez_{3}) = v ez_{5} = 𒅖	iz = 𒄑 íz (iz_{2}) = 𒅖 ìz (iz_{3}) = 𒀊	uz = 𒊻 úz (uz_{2}) = 𒍑 ùz (uz_{3}) = 𒍚 uz_{4} = 𒊍 uz_{5} = 𒇇 uz_{6} = 𒍚 uz_{7} = 𒌍	-z

Akkadian VCV syllabic glyphs
	aCV	eCV	iCV	uCV
-ʾ-	àʾa (aʾa_{3}) = 𒆹			uʾa = 𒇇𒀀
-ʾ-		eʾi = 𒂍𒀀		uʾi = 𒇇𒀀
-ʾ-		eʾu = 𒂍𒀀		uʾu = 𒇇𒀀
-b-	aba = 𒀊 àba (aba_{3}) = 𒀜 aba_{4} = 𒀔			úba (uba_{2}) = 𒂠 ùba (uba_{3}) = 𒀚 uba_{5} = 𒀛, 𒀚
-b-				ubi = 𒃴 úbi (ubi_{2}) = 𒋦
-b-				ubu = 𒀹 úbu (ubu_{2}) = 𒌒
-d-		edi = 𒃄	idi = 𒃟	
-d-				udu = 𒇻 údu (udu_{2}) = 𒋗𒁁
-g-	aga = 𒂆 ága (aga_{2}) = 𒉘 àga (aga_{3}) = 𒂅	ega = 𒀀𒈪𒀀 éga (ega_{2}) = 𒉧	iga = 𒅅	uga = 𒌑𒉀𒂵 úga (uga_{2}) = 𒀀𒅗
-g-		ege = 𒂠 ége (ege_{2}) = 𒊩𒂠		
-g-		egi = 𒂠 égi (egi_{2}) = 𒊩𒂠	igi = 𒅆 ígi (igi_{2}) = 𒅊 ìgi (igi_{3}) = 𒆠𒊕	
-g-	agu = 𒂆	egu = 𒀀𒆪	igu = 𒅆	ugu = 𒌋𒅗 úgu (ugu_{2}) = 𒀀𒅗 ùgu (ugu_{3}) = 𒀀𒊕 ugu_{4} = 𒆪 ugu_{5} = 𒊨
-ḫ-	aḫa = 𒄴 áḫa (aḫa_{2}) = 𒋀 àḫa (aḫa_{3}) = 𒉽			
-ḫ-		eḫe = 𒀉𒌓𒁺		
-ḫ-	aḫi = 𒋀 áḫi (aḫi_{2}) = 𒀉	eḫi = 𒀉𒌓𒁺		
-ḫ-				uḫu = 𒄴 úḫu (uḫu_{2}) = 𒌔
-i-	aia = 𒀀𒀀 áia (aia_{2}) = 𒀀 àia (aia_{3}) = 𒌨 aia_{4} = 𒆹			uia = 𒌋𒐊
-k-	aka = 𒀝 áka (aka_{2}) = 𒉘 àka (aka_{3}) = 𒋃 aka_{4} = 𒆍			
-k-		eki = 𒂊		
-k-		iku = 𒃷	uku = 𒂆 úku (uku_{2}) = 𒇳𒁺 ùku (uku_{3}) = 𒌦 uku_{4} = 𒊌 uku_{5} = 𒇳𒁺𒁺	
-l-	ala = 𒌷 ála (ala_{2}) = 𒌷𒈨𒌍 àla (ala_{3}) = 𒀠	ela = 𒀀𒆗	ila = 𒀭 íla (ila_{2}) = 𒅍	ula = 𒌌 úla (ula_{2}) = 𒃪
-l-	ale = 𒌷	ele = 𒌋𒅗 éle (ele_{2}) = 𒂖		
-l-	ali = 𒌷	ili = 𒀭 íli (ili_{2}) = 𒅍 ili_{5} = 𒂖 ili_{6} = 𒁹 ili_{7} = 𒀭𒈨𒌍		uli = 𒅴
-l-	alu / ālu = 𒌷		ilu = 𒀭	ulu = 𒌌 úlu (ulu_{2}) = 𒄴𒈨𒌋 ùlu (ulu_{3}) = 𒍇 ulu_{4} = 𒌷
-m-	ama = 𒂼 áma (ama_{2}) = 𒄠 àma (ama_{3}) = 𒄀𒇻 ama_{4} = 𒃘 ama_{5} = 𒃣 ama_{6} = 𒆾			uma = 𒍻
-m-	ame = 𒂼 áme (ame_{2}) = 𒃣	eme = 𒅴 éme (eme_{2}) = 𒎘 ème (eme_{3}) = 𒊩𒀲 eme_{4} = 𒂼 eme_{5} = 𒊩𒄸 eme_{6} = 𒀲𒊩 eme_{7} = 𒊩𒀠 eme_{8} = 𒃣		
-m-			imi = 𒅎 ími (imi_{2}) = 𒂼	
-m-				umu = 𒌝
-n-	ana = 𒁹 ána (ana_{2}) = 𒀭 àna (ana_{3}) = 𒀸		ina = 𒀸 ína (ina_{2}) = 𒅆	
-n-		eni = 𒂗	ini = 𒅔 íni (ini_{2}) = 𒅆 ini_{4} = 𒅆𒈫	
-n-	anu = 𒀭	enu = 𒂗 ēnu = 𒅆	īnu = 𒅆, 𒅆 īnu^{II} = 𒅆, 𒅆𒈫 ínu (inu_{2}) = 𒅆	unu = 𒀔 únu (unu_{2}) = 𒋼𒀕 ùnu (unu_{3}) = 𒀖𒆪 unu_{4} = 𒌦 unu_{5} = 𒀊 unu_{6} = 𒋼𒀊 unu_{7} = 𒋽𒀕 unu_{8} = 𒍑 unu_{9} = 𒆒𒋙 / 𒆓 unu_{10} = 𒄃 unu_{11} = 𒍝𒈽𒀕 unu_{12} = 𒁐
-q-	aqa = 𒀝			
-r-	ara = 𒊭 ára (ara_{2}) = 𒌒 àra (ara_{3}) = 𒄯 ara_{4} = 𒌓𒁺 ara_{5} = 𒄯𒄯 ara_{6} = 𒁺 ara_{7} = 𒌓 ara_{8} = 𒅈	era = 𒀴𒊏 éra (era_{2}) = 𒀀𒅆 èra (era_{3}) = 𒃞 era_{4} = 𒃢	íra (ira_{2}) = 𒀀𒅆	ura_{15} = 𒋀𒀕 ura_{16} = 𒋀𒀊
-r-	ari = 𒌵 ári (ari_{2}) = 𒁁 àri (ari_{3}) = 𒉺 ari_{5} = 𒉺𒈨𒌍 ari_{6} = 𒋧	eri = 𒌷 eri_{4} = 𒌷 ? eri_{11} = 𒀔 eri_{12} = 𒀊 eri_{13} = 𒈁 eri_{14} = 𒅕 eri_{15} = 𒃞 eri16 = 𒃢	iri = 𒌷 iri_{8} = 𒁁 iri_{11} = 𒀕 iri_{12} = 𒀊 iri_{14} = 𒅕	uri = 𒌵 úri (uri_{2}) = 𒋀𒀕 ùri (uri_{3}) = 𒋀 uri_{4} = 𒁁 uri_{5} = 𒋀𒀊
-r-	aru = 𒉺	eru = 𒀴 éru (eru_{2}) = 𒊕𒊩 èru (eru_{3}) = 𒊟 eru_{4} = 𒀀𒂔 eru_{5} = 𒂔		uru = 𒌷 úru (uru_{2}) = 𒍍 ùru (uru_{3}) = 𒋀 uru_{4} = 𒀳 uru_{5} = 𒋽 uru_{6} = 𒉞 uru_{7} = 𒌲 uru_{8} = 𒌫 uru_{9} = 𒋞𒁁 uru_{10} = 𒊠 uru_{11} = 𒌾 uru_{12} = 𒃡 uru_{13} = 𒌨 uru_{14} = 𒋀𒀕 uru_{15} = 𒋀𒀊 uru_{16} = 𒂗 uru_{17} = 𒍇 uru_{18} = 𒌸 uru_{19} = 𒌵
-s-	asa = 𒊍			usa = 𒐍, 𒑄
-s-	asi = 𒀀𒌁	esi = 𒆗	isi = 𒅖	usi = 𒃥
-s-				usu = 𒀉𒆗 úsu (usu_{2}) = 𒍑
-š-	aša = 𒀸 áša (aša_{2}) = 𒀾 àša (aša_{3}) = 𒐋 aša_{5} = 𒃷	eša = 𒀀𒌁 éša (eša_{2}) = 𒌍		
-š-		eše = 𒌍 éše (eše_{2}) = 𒂠 èše (eše_{3}) = 𒑘 eše_{4} = 𒀀𒌁		
-š-			iši = 𒅖 íši (iši_{2}) = 𒋙𒀯	
-š-				ušu = 𒁔 úšu (ušu_{2}) = 𒌋𒌓 ùšu (ušu_{3}) = 𒌍
-t-			ita_{4} = 𒀭𒀀𒇉 ita_{5} = 𒀀𒇉	uta = 𒌓
-t-			iti = 𒌗 íti (iti_{2}) = 𒌛 ìti (iti_{3}) = 𒆜𒌗 iti_{4} = 𒀭𒀀𒇉 iti_{5} = 𒀀𒇉 iti_{6} = 𒌓𒀭𒋀𒆠 iti_{7} = 𒌗𒀭𒋀𒆠	
-t-			itu = 𒌗 ítu (itu_{2}) = 𒌛 itu_{4} = 𒀭𒀀𒇉 itu_{5} = 𒀀𒇉	utu = 𒌓 útu (utu_{2}) = 𒌋𒂵 ùtu (utu_{3}) = 𒌋𒌋 utu_{4} = 𒆠𒆠 utu_{5} = 𒀾
-y- (-i̭- / -j-)	aya / ai̭a / aja = 𒀀𒀀		iya / ija = 𒀀𒀀	
-y- (-i̭- / -j-)	aye / ai̭e / aje = 𒀀𒀀		iye / ije = 𒀀𒀀	
-y- (-i̭- / -j-)	ayi / ai̭i / aji = 𒀀𒀀		iyi / iji = 𒀀𒀀	
-y- (-i̭- / -j-)	ayu / ai̭u / aju = 𒀀𒀀		iyu / iju = 𒀀𒀀	
-z-	aza = 𒊍			ùza (uza_{3}) = 𒍚
-z-			izi = 𒉈 ízi (izi_{2}) = 𒆠𒉈	
-z-	azu = 𒉙		izu = 𒉈	uzu = 𒍜 úzu (uzu_{2}) = 𒉙 ùzu (uzu_{3}) = 𒊻 uzu_{5} = 𒌋𒌓

Akkadian CVV and CVC syllabic glyphs
	CaV/CaC	CeV/CeC	CiV/CiC	CuV/CuC
b-	baʾ = 𒁁			
b-	bab = 𒉽 báb (bab_{2}) = 𒌓			
b-	bad = 𒁁 bàd (bad_{3}) = 𒂦 bad_{4} = 𒆠𒆗 bad_{5} = 𒅆		bid = 𒂍 bíd (bid_{2}) = 𒁁 bìd (bid_{3}) = 𒆪	
b-	bag = 𒄷		big = 𒋝	bug = 𒈮
b-	baḫ = 𒄷 bàḫ (baḫ_{3}) = 𒈜			buḫ = 𒈜
b-	bak = 𒄷		bik = 𒋝	buk = 𒈮
b-	bal = 𒁄 bál (bal_{2}) = 𒁔 bàl (bal_{3}) = 𒀡 bal_{4} = 𒀦	bel = 𒉈 bél (bel_{2}) = 𒉋	bil = 𒉈 bíl (bil_{2}) = 𒉋 bìl (bil_{3}) = 𒄑𒉋 bil_{4} = 𒄑𒉈	bul = 𒇧 búl (bul_{2}) = 𒁔 bùl (bul_{3}) = 𒁄 bul_{4} = 𒅮 bul_{5} = 𒇡
b-				bum = 𒅤 búm (bum_{2}) = 𒁆, 𒂀 bùm (bum_{3}) = 𒅗
b-	ban = 𒉼 bán (ban_{2}) = 𒑏 bàn (ban_{3}) = 𒌉 ban_{4} = 𒆕		bin = 𒀳	bun = 𒇌 bún (bun_{2}) = 𒅮
b-	bap = 𒉽			
b-	baq = 𒄷		biq = 𒋝	
b-	bar = 𒁇 bár (bar_{2}) = 𒁈 bàr (bar_{3}) = 𒁖 bar_{4} = 𒉌𒂟 bar_{5} = 𒋞 bar_{6} = 𒌓 bar_{7} = 𒉈 bar_{8} = 𒂙	ber = 𒄵 bér (ber_{2}) = 𒌓 ber_{7} = 𒊯	bir = 𒄵 bír (bir_{2}) = 𒌓 bìr (bir_{3}) = 𒂟 bir_{4} = 𒂔 bir_{5} = 𒉆, 𒉅 bir_{6} = 𒊶 bir_{7} = 𒊯 bir_{8} = 𒀀𒋤 bir_{9} = 𒉈 bir_{10} = 𒄊	bur = 𒁓 búr (bur_{2}) = 𒁔 bùr (bur_{3}) = 𒌋 bur_{4} = 𒋓𒁓 bur_{5} = 𒉅 bur_{6} = 𒆤, 𒆦 bur_{8} = 𒄬 bur_{10} = 𒇧 bur_{11} = 𒆠𒂗𒆕 bur_{12} = 𒁍 bur_{13} = 𒉽𒉽 bur_{14} = 𒂙
b-			bís (bis_{2}) = 𒄫	
b-	baš = 𒈦	beš_{12} = 𒌓	biš = 𒄫	buš = 𒆜 búš (buš_{2}) = 𒄫
b-	bat = 𒁁 bát (bat_{2}) = 𒉻 bàt (bat_{3}) = 𒂦 bat_{5} = 𒅆	bet = 𒂍	bit = 𒂍 bít (bit_{2}) = 𒁁	
b-	baṭ = 𒁁		biṭ = 𒂍	
b-			biz = 𒁉	
d-
d-	dab = 𒁳 dáb (dab_{2}) = 𒋰 dàb (dab_{3}) = 𒄭 dab_{4} = 𒁾 dab_{5} = 𒆪 dab_{6} = 𒍏		dib = 𒁳 díb (dib_{2}) = 𒆪	dub = 𒁾 dúb (dub_{2}) = 𒂀 dùb (dub_{3}) = 𒄭
d-	dad = 𒋺		did = 𒅎	dud = 𒉺𒍜
d-	dag = 𒁖 dág (dag_{2}) = 𒌓 dàg (dag_{3}) = 𒉌𒂟 dag_{4} = 𒆦 dag_{5} = 𒅗 dag_{6} = 𒋳		dig = 𒉌	dug = 𒂁 dúg (dug_{2}) = 𒌇 dùg (dug_{3}) = 𒄭 dug_{4} = 𒅗 dug_{5} = 𒂅
d-	daḫ = 𒈭	deḫ = 𒁾 déḫ (deḫ_{2}) = 𒌝 dèḫ (deḫ_{3}) = 𒉏	diḫ = 𒁾 díḫ (diḫ_{2}) = 𒌝 dìḫ (diḫ_{3}) = 𒉏	duḫ = 𒂃
d-	dak = 𒁖 dàk (dak_{3}) = 𒉌𒂟		dik = 𒉌	duk = 𒂁 dúk (duk_{2}) = 𒌇
d-	dal = 𒊑 dál (dal_{2}) = 𒈦𒄘𒃼 dàl (dal_{3}) = 𒀸	del = 𒀸 dél (del_{2}) = 𒇺	dil = 𒀸	dul = 𒌋𒌆 dúl (dul_{2}) = 𒇥 dùl (dul_{3}) = 𒊨 dul_{4} = 𒂈 dul_{5} = 𒌆 dul_{6} = 𒇯 dul_{7} = 𒊕 dul_{8} = 𒁳 dul_{9} = 𒌪 dul_{10} = 𒁍
d-	dam = 𒁮 dám (dam_{2}) = 𒌓 dàm (dam_{3}) = 𒌈	dém (dem_{2}) = 𒁶	dim = 𒁴 dím (dim_{2}) = 𒁶 dìm (dim_{3}) = 𒊐𒃵, 𒈕 dim_{4} = 𒉽𒉽 dim_{5} = 𒂀	dum = 𒌈 dùm (dum_{3}) = 𒁮 dum_{4} = 𒁴
d-	dan = 𒆗 dán (dan_{2}) = 𒃞 dàn (dan_{3}) = 𒃩 dan_{4} = 𒃋 dan_{5} = 𒁷 dan_{6} = 𒍕 dan_{7} = 𒃃	den = 𒁷	din = 𒁷 dín (din_{2}) = 𒆗 dìn (din_{3}) = 𒁶	dun = 𒂄 dùn (dun_{3}) = 𒂅 dun_{4} = 𒂈 dun_{5} = 𒁔 dun_{6} = 𒆗
d-	dap = 𒁳 dáp (dap_{2}) = 𒋰		dip = 𒁳	dup = 𒁾 dúp (dup_{2}) = 𒂀
d-	daq = 𒁖 dàq (daq_{3}) = 𒉌𒂟 daq_{10} = 𒋳		diq = 𒉌	duq = 𒂁
d-	dar = 𒁯 dár (dar_{2}) = 𒅁 dàr (dar_{3}) = 𒁰 dar_{4} = 𒁱 dar_{6} = 𒋻	der = 𒋛𒀀	dir = 𒋛𒀀 dír (dir_{2}) = 𒁯 dìr (dir_{3}) = 𒀭 dir_{4} = 𒌁	dur = 𒄙 dúr (dur_{2}) = 𒂉, 𒆪 dùr (dur_{3}) = 𒀲𒀴 dur_{4} = 𒁉𒑖 dur_{5} = 𒀀 dur_{7} = 𒁍 dur_{8} = 𒂦 dur_{9} = 𒂄 dur_{10} = 𒊿 dur_{11} = 𒌅
d-	das = 𒌨			
d-	daš = 𒌨 dáš (daš_{2}) = 𒁹 dàš (daš_{3}) = 𒀾 daš_{4} = 𒁯	deš = 𒁹 déš (deš_{2}) = 𒀸 dèš (deš_{3}) = 𒌨 deš_{4} = 𒈨 deš_{5} = 𒀹	diš = 𒁹 díš (diš_{2}) = 𒀸 diš_{5} = 𒀹	duš = 𒆪 dúš (duš_{2}) = 𒁹
d-	dat = 𒋺			
g-	gab = 𒃮 gáb (gab_{2}) = 𒆏 gàb (gab_{3}) = 𒅘		gib = 𒄃 gíb (gib_{2}) = 𒁉𒑖 gìb (gib_{3}) = 𒈪𒉭	gub = 𒁺 gúb (gub_{2}) = 𒇷 gùb (gub_{3}) = 𒆏 gub_{4} = 𒉌 gub_{5} = 𒀜𒆤
g-	gad = 𒃰		gid = 𒆤 gíd (gid_{2}) = 𒁍 gìd (gid_{3}) = 𒊓 gid_{4} = 𒃰 gid_{6} = 𒋺	gud = 𒄞 gúd (gud_{2}) = 𒊥 gùd (gud_{3}) = 𒌑𒆠𒋧𒂵 gud_{4} = 𒋻 gud_{5} = 𒃴 gud_{6} = 𒈝 gud_{7} = 𒆪 gud_{8} = 𒆸 gud_{9} = 𒋃 gud_{10} = 𒁆, 𒂀
g-	gag = 𒆕		gig = 𒈪𒉭 gíg (gig_{2}) = 𒈪 gìg (gig_{3}) = 𒄃 gig_{4} = 𒂅	gug = 𒍝𒄢 gúg (gug_{2}) = 𒈖 gùg (gug_{3}) = 𒃻𒈖 gug_{4} = 𒍤𒆸 gug_{5} = 𒈙 gug_{6} = 𒅗𒆕
g-	gak = 𒆕		gik = 𒈪𒉭	gúk (guk_{2}) = 𒈖
g-	gal = 𒃲 gál (gal_{2}) = 𒅅 gàl (gal_{3}) = 𒍇 gal_{4} = 𒊩 gal_{5} = 𒋼 gal_{8} = 𒌓 gal_{9} = 𒆗 gal_{10} = 𒇽𒁹	gel = 𒄃 gél (gel_{2}) = 𒆸	gil = 𒄃 gíl (gil_{2}) = 𒆸 gìl (gil_{3}) = 𒅍	gul = 𒄢 gúl (gul_{2}) = 𒆰 gùl (gul_{3}) = 𒋼
g-	gam = 𒃵 gám (gam_{2}) = 𒄰 gàm (gam_{3}) = 𒆛 gam_{4} = 𒃶	gem = 𒁶 gèm (gem_{3}) = 𒊩𒆳	gim = 𒁶 gím (gim_{2}) = 𒂅 gìm (gim_{3}) = 𒊩𒆳 gim_{4} = 𒁽 gim_{5} = 𒁼 gim_{6} = 𒁺 gim_{7} = 𒁍 gim_{8} = 𒃰𒋺𒄑	gum = 𒄣 gúm (gum_{2}) = 𒈝 gùm (gum_{3}) = 𒉈 gum_{4} = 𒃵
g-	gan = 𒃶 gán (gan_{2}) = 𒃷 gàn (gan_{3}) = 𒁽 gan_{7} = 𒃵	gen = 𒁺 gèn (gen_{3}) = 𒆳 gen_{7} = 𒁶	gin = 𒁺 gín (gin_{2}) = 𒂅 gìn (gin_{3}) = 𒆳 gin_{4} = 𒍤𒆸 gin_{6} = 𒄀 gin_{7} = 𒁶 gin8 = 𒄯	gun = 𒄘𒌦 gún (gun_{2}) = 𒄘 gùn (gun_{3}) = 𒁯 gun_{4} = 𒀕 gun_{5} = 𒈝
g-	gap = 𒃮 gáp (gap_{2}) = 𒆏		gíp (gip_{2}) = 𒄒	gup = 𒁺 gúp (gup_{2}) = 𒇷
g-			giq = 𒈪𒉭	guq = 𒍝𒄢
g-	gar = 𒃻 gár (gar_{2}) = 𒂶 gàr (gar_{3}) = 𒃼 gar_{4} = 𒄞𒄞 gar_{5} = 𒈖 gar_{6} = 𒉣 gar_{7} = 𒈥 gar_{8} = 𒋞 gar_{9} = 𒂵 gar_{10} = 𒂶 gar_{11} = 𒂶 gar_{12} = 𒂶 gar_{13} = 𒋽 gar_{14} = 𒋼𒀀 gar_{19} = 𒃸	ger = 𒄫 gér (ger_{2}) = 𒄈 gèr (ger_{3}) = 𒁺 ger_{15} = 𒂠	gir = 𒄫 gír (gir_{2}) = 𒄈 gìr (gir_{3}) = 𒄊 gir_{4} = 𒌋𒀜 gir_{5} = 𒁽 gir_{6} = 𒁼 gir_{7} = 𒁺 gir_{8} = 𒆸 gir_{9} = 𒀚 gir_{10} = 𒉈 gir_{11} = 𒂡 gir_{12} = 𒅔 gir_{13} = 𒋃 gir_{14} = 𒄩 gir_{15} = 𒂠 gir_{16} = 𒄌 gir_{17} = 𒅗	gur = 𒄥 gúr (gur_{2}) = 𒑲 gùr (gur_{3}) = 𒅍 gur_{4} = 𒆸 gur_{5} = 𒍀, 𒅫 gur_{6} = 𒃸 gur_{7} = 𒄦 gur_{8} = 𒋽 gur_{9} = 𒉒 gur_{10} = 𒆥 gur_{11} = 𒂵 gur_{12} = 𒉽 gur_{13} = 𒉌 gur_{14} = 𒄯 gur_{15} = 𒌴 gur_{16} = 𒆳 gur_{17} = 𒄕 gur_{18} = 𒅗 gur_{19} = 𒉣𒆠 gur_{22} = 𒇉
g-	gas = 𒄤 gás (gas_{2}) = 𒄣		gis = 𒄑	
g-	gaṣ = 𒄤		giṣ = 𒄑	
g-	gaš = 𒁉	geš = 𒄑 géš (geš_{2}) = 𒁹 gèš (geš_{3}) = 𒍑 geš_{4} = 𒀸	giš = 𒄑 gíš (giš_{2}) = 𒁹 gìš (giš_{3}) = 𒍑	guš = 𒋢
g-	gat = 𒃰 gát (gat_{2}) = 𒆐 gàt (gat_{3}) = 𒆑		git = 𒆤 gít (git_{2}) = 𒁍	
g-			gíṭ (giṭ_{2}) = 𒁍	
g-	gaz = 𒄤 gáz (gaz_{2}) = 𒄣 gàz (gaz_{3}) =	gez = 𒄑	giz = 𒄑	guz = 𒈝 gúz (guz_{2}) = 𒁍 gùz (guz_{3}) = 𒆪
ḫ-	ḫab = 𒆸 ḫáb (ḫab_{3}) = 𒇥			ḫub = 𒄽 ḫúb (ḫub_{2}) = 𒄸
ḫ-	ḫad = 𒉺 ḫád (ḫad_{2}) = 𒌓 ḫad (ḫad_{3}) = 𒊷 ḫad_{4} = 𒆒, 𒆓			ḫud = 𒉺 ḫúd (ḫud_{2}) = 𒌓 ḫùd (ḫud_{3}) = 𒄰 ḫud_{4} = 𒊷
ḫ-				ḫug = 𒂠
ḫ-	ḫal = 𒄬 ḫál (ḫal_{2}) = 𒍮			ḫul = 𒅆𒌨 ḫúl (ḫul_{2}) = 𒄾 ḫùl (ḫul_{3}) = 𒄒 ḫul_{4} = 𒅆𒌪
ḫ-				ḫum = 𒈝
ḫ-				ḫun = 𒂠
ḫ-	ḫap = 𒆸			ḫup = 𒄽 ḫúp (ḫup_{2}) = 𒄸
ḫ-	ḫar = 𒄯 ḫár (ḫar_{2}) = 𒄞 ḫàr (ḫar_{3}) = 𒇽𒆸, 𒈊 ḫar_{4} = 𒁚	ḫer = 𒂡	ḫir = 𒂡 ḫír (ḫir_{2}) = 𒄯	ḫur = 𒄯
ḫ-	ḫas = 𒋻 ḫás (ḫas_{2}) = 𒉺 ḫàs (ḫas_{3}) = 𒍨			ḫus = 𒈝 ḫús (ḫus_{2}) = 𒋻
ḫ-	ḫaṣ = 𒋻 ḫáṣ (ḫaṣ_{2}) = 𒉺			
ḫ-	ḫaš = 𒋻 ḫáš (ḫaš_{2}) = 𒍨 ḫàš (ḫaš_{3}) = 𒌓 ḫaš_{4} = 𒍮	ḫeš = 𒌓 ḫéš (ḫeš_{2}) = 𒍨 ḫeš_{5} = 𒇽𒃷, 𒈂	ḫiš = 𒌓 ḫiš (ḫíš_{2}) = 𒍨 ḫiš (ḫìš_{3}) = 𒂟 ḫiš_{4} = 𒄭𒄊	ḫuš = 𒄭𒄊 ḫúš (ḫuš_{2}) = 𒄊
ḫ-	ḫat = 𒉺			
ḫ-	ḫaṭ = 𒉺			
ḫ-	ḫaz = 𒋻 ḫáz (ḫaz_{2}) = 𒉺			ḫuz = 𒈝
k-				kua = 𒄩 kuá (kua_{2}) = 𒌔
k-	kab = 𒆏 káb (kab_{2}) = 𒅘		kib = 𒄒	kub = 𒁺 kùb (kub_{3}) = 𒄸 kub_{4} = 𒆤
k-	kad = 𒃰 kád (kad_{2}) = 𒆐 kàd (kad_{3}) = 𒆑 kad_{4} = 𒆒 kad_{5} = 𒆓 kad_{6} = 𒍦 kad_{8} = 𒀽		kid = 𒆤 kíd (kid_{2}) = 𒋺 kìd (kid_{3}) = 𒀝 kid_{4} = 𒋃 kid_{5} = 𒆒 kid_{6} = 𒆓 kid_{7} = 𒅎𒋺, 𒅏 kid_{8} = 𒊩𒋺 kid_{9} = 𒃰 kid_{10} = 𒁍	kud = 𒋻 kùd (kud_{3}) = 𒆪 kud_{6} = 𒆑
k-	kag = 𒆕 kág (kag_{2}) = 𒅗		kíg (kig_{2}) = 𒆥	kug = 𒆬
k-	kak = 𒆕		kik = 𒈪𒉭	kuk = 𒆬 kúk (kuk_{2}) = 𒈖
k-	kal = 𒆗 kál (kal_{2}) = 𒃲 kàl (kal_{3}) = 𒆕 kal_{4} = 𒊩	kel = 𒆸 kèl (kel_{3}) = 𒇔	kil = 𒆸 kíl (kil_{2}) = 𒄃 kìl (kil_{3}) = 𒇔 kil_{4} = 𒃰𒋺	kul = 𒆰 kúl (kul_{2}) = 𒄢
k-	kam = 𒄰 kám (kam_{2}) = 𒃶 kàm (kam_{3}) = 𒆒, 𒆓 kam_{4} = 𒆛	kem = 𒁶	kim = 𒁶 kím (kim_{2}) = 𒆒, 𒆓 kìm (kim_{3}) = 𒁍 kim_{4} = 𒁽 kim_{5} = 𒁼 kim_{6} = 𒁺	kum = 𒄣 kúm (kum_{2}) = 𒉈 kùm (kum_{3}) = 𒉽𒅊𒉣𒈨𒂬 kum_{4} = 𒌓 kum_{5} = 𒅖
k-	kan = 𒃶 kán (kan_{2}) = 𒃷 kàm (kan_{3}) = 𒊝 kan_{4} = 𒆍 kan_{5} = 𒅸 kan_{6} = 𒅤	kèn (ken_{3}) = 𒆳	kin = 𒆥 kín (kin_{2}) = 𒄯 kìn (kin_{3}) = 𒆳 kin_{4} = 𒆸𒆸 kin_{5} = 𒌺 kin_{7} = 𒁺 kin_{8} = 𒁶	kun = 𒆲 kún (kun_{2}) = 𒉺 kùn (kun_{3}) = 𒄣 kun_{4} = 𒄿𒇻 / 𒄿𒁳 kun_{5} = 𒌉𒂠 kun_{8} = 𒈧 kun_{9} = 𒉈 kun_{10} = 𒆥
k-	kap = 𒆏 kàp (kap_{3}) = 𒃮	kep = 𒄒	kip = 𒄒	kup = 𒁺 kùp (kup_{3}) = 𒄸 kup_{4} = 𒆤
k-	kaq = 𒆕			
k-	kar = 𒋼𒀀 kár (kar_{2}) = 𒃸 kàr (kar_{3}) = 𒃼 kar_{4} = 𒄫 kar_{5} = 𒃻	ker = 𒄫 ker_{6} = 𒀘 ker_{7} = 𒉑	kir = 𒄫 kír (kir_{2}) = 𒀚 kìr (kir_{3}) = 𒆸 kir_{4} = 𒅗 kir_{5} = 𒁁 kir_{6} = 𒀘 kir_{7} = 𒉑 kir_{8} = 𒋼𒀀 kir_{9} = 𒄩 kir_{10} = 𒄊 kir_{11} = 𒊩𒃢 kir_{12} = 𒌋𒂘 kir_{13} = 𒌋𒀜 kir_{14} = 𒅯 kir_{15} = 𒋃 kir_{16} = 𒃼 kir_{17} = 𒉐	kur = 𒆳 kúr (kur_{2}) = 𒉽 kùr (kur_{3}) = 𒄥 kur_{4} = 𒆸 kur_{5} = 𒋻 kur_{6} = 𒉻 kur_{7} = 𒅆𒂟 kur_{7} = 𒅆𒃻 (old) kur_{8} = 𒅥 kur_{9} = 𒆭, 𒋽 kur_{11} = 𒉣𒆠 kur_{12} = 𒍀 kur_{15} = 𒂵
k-	kas = 𒆜 kás (kas_{2}) = 𒁉 kàs (kas_{3}) = 𒄤 kas_{4} = 𒁽 kas_{5} = 𒁼 kas_{6} = 𒄣 kas_{7} = 𒋃		kis = 𒆧 kís (kis_{2}) = 𒄑	kus = 𒋢 kús (kus_{2}) = 𒈝
k-	kaṣ = 𒆜 káṣ (kaṣ_{2}) = 𒁉 kàṣ (kaṣ_{3}) = 𒄤		kiṣ = 𒆧	kúṣ (kuṣ_{2}) = 𒈝
k-	kaš = 𒁉 káš (kaš_{2}) = 𒆜 kàš (kaš_{3}) = 𒍒 kaš_{4} = 𒁽 kaš_{5} = 𒁺 kaš_{6} = 𒄤	keš = 𒆧 kéš (keš_{2}) = 𒂡 kèš (keš_{3}) = 𒋙𒀭𒄲 keš_{4} = 𒊔 keš_{7} = 𒁝 keš_{8} = 𒁞 keš_{9} = 𒁬 keš_{18} = 𒌔	kiš = 𒆧 kíš (kiš_{2}) = 𒂡 kiš_{5} = 𒋝𒋙𒁷, 𒉾 kiš_{8} = 𒁞 kiš_{9} = 𒁬 kiš_{16} = 𒌑𒄉 kiš_{17} = 𒄉	kuš = 𒋢 kúš (kuš_{2}) = 𒊨 kùš (kuš_{3}) = 𒌑 kuš_{4} = 𒉺𒀭 kuš_{5} = 𒌋𒄊 kuš_{6} = 𒆯 kuš_{7} = 𒅖 kuš_{8} = 𒄾 kuš_{9} = 𒆵 kuš_{10} = 𒋝𒋙𒁷, 𒉾
k-	kat = 𒃰 kát (kat_{2}) = 𒆐 kàt (kat_{3}) = 𒆑 kat_{4} = 𒆒 kat_{5} = 𒆓 kat_{7} = 𒋗	ket = 𒆤	kit = 𒆤 kít (kit_{2}) = 𒋺 kit_{9} = 𒃰 kit_{16} = 𒁍	kut = 𒋻 kút (kut_{2}) = 𒃰
k-			kiṭ = 𒆤	
k-	kaz_{8} = 𒄮 kaz_{9} = 𒌓𒄯			kuz = 𒋢 kùz (kuz_{3}) = 𒆪
l-	lab = 𒆗 láb (lab_{2}) = 𒈜	leb = 𒈜	lib = 𒈜 líb (lib_{2}) = 𒆗 lìb (lib_{3}) = 𒊮 lib_{4} = 𒅆 lib_{5} = 𒊠	lub = 𒈜
l-	lad = 𒆳		lid = 𒀖 líd (lid_{2}) = 𒉌	lud = 𒂁
l-	lag = 𒋃		lig = 𒌨	lug = 𒇻 lúg (lug_{2}) = 𒉺
l-	laḫ = 𒌓 láḫ (laḫ_{2}) = 𒂟 làḫ (laḫ_{3}) = 𒈛 laḫ_{4} = 𒁻 laḫ_{5} = 𒁺𒁺 laḫ_{6} = 𒁺 laḫ_{7} = 𒁽		liḫ = 𒌓 líḫ (liḫ_{2}) = 𒂟 lìḫ (liḫ_{3}) = 𒈛 liḫ_{4} = 𒇺	luḫ = 𒈛
l-	lak = 𒋃		lik = 𒌨 lík (lik_{2}) = 𒋃	
l-	lal = 𒇲 lál (lal_{2}) = 𒇳 làl (lal_{3}) = 𒋭 lal_{4} = 𒇸 lal_{5} = 𒋙𒌍 lal_{6} = 𒋙𒉈	lél (lel_{2}) = 𒆤 lel_{4} = 𒆦	lil = 𒇸 líl (lil_{2}) = 𒆤 lìl (lil_{3}) = 𒋙𒌍 lil_{5} = 𒋙𒉈 lil_{6} = 𒄘 lil_{7} = 𒂁𒋡𒁓 lil_{8} = 𒈑	lul = 𒈜
l-	lam = 𒇴 lám (lam_{2}) = 𒉈 làm (lam_{3}) = 𒁮 lam_{4} = 𒐂 lam_{5} = 𒅆 lam_{6} = 𒉆 lam_{7} = 𒇶	lem = 𒅆 lem_{4} = 𒉈	lim = 𒅆 lím (lim_{2}) = 𒐂 lìm (lim_{3}) = 𒇴	lum = 𒈝 lúm (lum_{2}) = 𒅆 lùm (lum_{3}) = 𒂁 lum_{4} = 𒇴
l-				lan = 𒉺
l-	lap = 𒆗	lép (lep_{2}) = 𒆗	lip = 𒈜 líp (lip_{2}) = 𒆗 lìp (lip_{2}) = 𒊮	lup = 𒈜
l-	laq = 𒋃	leq = 𒌨	liq = 𒌨 líq (liq_{2}) = 𒋃 lìq (liq_{3}) = 𒀀𒄷𒋛	
l-	lar = 𒉺		lir = 𒉪	
l-			lis = 𒇺	
l-			liš = 𒇺	
l-	lat = 𒆳		lit = 𒀖	lut = 𒂁
l-			liṭ = 𒀖 líṭ (liṭ_{2}) = 𒂁	
l-			liz = 𒇺	
m-				mua = 𒉺
m-	maʾ = 𒈣			
m-	mad = 𒆳		mid = 𒁁	mud = 𒄷𒄭 múd (mud_{2}) = 𒁁 mùd (mud_{3}) = 𒉸 mud_{4} = 𒆸𒌋𒆕 mud_{5} = 𒋆 mud_{6} = 𒊬 mud_{7} = 𒍤𒆸 mud_{8} = 𒉳
m-				mug = 𒈮 múg (mug_{2}) = 𒊩𒆷
m-	maḫ = 𒈤 máḫ (maḫ_{2}) = 𒀠 màḫ (maḫ_{3}) = 𒌋𒅗	meḫ = 𒈤	miḫ = 𒈤	muḫ = 𒌋𒅗 múḫ (muḫ_{2}) = 𒊚 muḫ_{4} = 𒊨
m-				muk = 𒈮
m-	mal = 𒂷 mál (mal_{2}) = 𒋛𒀀 mal_{4} = 𒇺	mel = 𒅖 mèl (mel_{3}) = 𒆠𒉈	mil = 𒅖	mul = 𒀯 múl (mul_{2}) = 𒋼 mùl (mul_{3}) = 𒄮 mul_{4} = 𒌌 mul_{5} = 𒃷
m-	mam = 𒌋𒌋 mám (mam_{2}) = 𒊩 màm (mam_{3}) = 𒊩𒈠		mim = 𒈫 mím (mim_{2}) = 𒈹 mìm (mim_{3}) = 𒌋𒌋 mim_{4} = 𒊩𒈠	mum = 𒌣
m-	man = 𒌋𒌋 màn (man_{3}) = 𒐀	men = 𒃞 mén (men_{2}) = 𒈨 mèn (men_{3}) = 𒁺 men_{4} = 𒇙 men_{5} = 𒌋𒌋	min = 𒈫 mín (min_{2}) = 𒊩 mìn (min_{3}) = 𒌋𒌋 min_{4} = 𒊩𒌆 min_{5} = 𒐀 min_{6} = 𒋰 min_{7} = 𒃞 min_{8} = 𒑊	mun = 𒁵 mún (mun_{2}) = 𒌣 mun_{4} = 𒋀 mun_{5} = 𒌋𒁵 mun_{6} = 𒌋𒁴
m-				muq = 𒈮
m-	mar = 𒈥 már (mar_{2}) = 𒀫 màr (mar_{3}) = 𒃻 mar_{5} = 𒌉 mar_{6} = 𒄯	mer = 𒂆 mér (mer_{2}) = 𒅎 mèr (mer_{3}) = 𒄈 mer_{4} = 𒋃	mir = 𒂆 mír (mir_{2}) = 𒅎 mir_{5} = 𒂧	mur = 𒄯 múr (mur_{2}) = 𒌘 mùr (mur_{3}) = 𒅎 mur_{6} = 𒆠𒂗𒆕 mur_{7} = 𒋞 mur_{8} = 𒈱 mur_{10} = 𒌆
m-	mas = 𒈦	mes = 𒈩 més (mes_{2}) = 𒁾 mès (mes_{3}) = 𒈨𒌍	mis = 𒈩	mus = 𒈲
m-	maṣ = 𒈦	meṣ = 𒈩	miṣ = 𒈩	
m-	maś = 𒈦			
m-	maš = 𒈦 máš (maš_{2}) = 𒈧 màš (maš_{3}) = 𒈦𒉺 maš_{4} = 𒉺	meš = 𒈨𒌍 méš (meš_{2}) = 𒈨 mèš (meš_{3}) = 𒈩	miš = 𒈩 míš (miš_{2}) = 𒈨𒌍 mìš (miš_{3}) = 𒄑	muš = 𒈲 múš (muš_{2}) = 𒈽 mùš (muš_{3}) = 𒈹 muš_{4} = 𒄮 muš_{5} = 𒋀 muš_{6} = 𒁑 muš_{7} = 𒁹 muš_{8} = 𒄷 muš_{9} = 𒈪
m-	mat = 𒆳 mát (mat_{2}) = 𒁁 màt (mat_{3}) = 𒄷𒄭	met = 𒁁	mit = 𒁁	mut = 𒄷𒄭 mút (mut_{2}) = 𒁁
m-	maṭ = 𒆳	meṭ = 𒁁	miṭ = 𒁁	muṭ = 𒄷𒄭
n-	nab = 𒀮 náb (nab_{2}) = 𒀯 nàb (nab_{3}) = 𒀭𒀭 nab_{4} = 𒅊		nib = 𒊋 níb (nib_{2}) = 𒀮	
n-	nad = 𒆳 nàd (nad_{3}) = 𒈿		nid = 𒍑	nud = 𒈿
n-	nag = 𒅘 nág (nag_{2}) = 𒉀		nig = 𒊩𒌨 níg (nig_{2}) = 𒃻 nig_{6} = 𒌋𒌓𒆤	nug = 𒋐 núg (nug_{2}) = 𒋊
n-	náḫ (naḫ_{2}) = 𒂠			
n-	nak = 𒅘 nák (nak_{2}) = 𒉀 nàk (nak_{3}) = 𒊩𒌨	nék (nek_{2}) = 𒃻	nik = 𒊩𒌨 ník (nik_{2}) = 𒃻 nik_{5} = 𒅘	
n-	nam = 𒉆 nám (nam_{2}) = 𒌆 nàm (nam_{3}) = 𒉏 nam_{4} = 𒅊	nem = 𒉏 ném (nem_{2}) = 𒊩𒌆	nim = 𒉏 ním (nim_{2}) = 𒊩𒌆 nìm (nim_{3}) = 𒌋𒌓 nim_{4} = 𒈝 nim_{5} = 𒃻	num = 𒉏 núm (num_{2}) = 𒈝
n-	nan = 𒋀 nán (nan_{2}) = 𒋀𒆠 nàn (nan_{3}) = 𒌍	nen = 𒊩𒌆 nen_{9} = 𒊩𒆪	nin = 𒊩𒌆 nín (nin_{2}) = 𒈹 nìn (nin_{3}) = 𒆸𒆸 nin_{4} = 𒆸 nin_{5} = 𒐏 nin_{6} = 𒃻 nin_{7} = 𒇧𒇧 nin_{9} = 𒊩𒆪 nin_{10} = 𒊩𒋠	nun = 𒉣 nūn = 𒄩 nún (nun_{2}) = 𒀀𒄩𒋻𒁺 nùn (nun_{3}) = 𒁍
n-	nap = 𒀮 náp (nap_{2}) = 𒀯		níp (nip_{2}) = 𒀮	
n-	naq = 𒅘		niq = 𒊩𒌨 níq (niq_{2}) = 𒃻	
n-	nar = 𒈜 nàr (nar_{3}) = 𒉪	ner = 𒉪	nir = 𒉪 nír (nir_{2}) = 𒍝𒂅 nìr (nir_{3}) = 𒍝𒉏 nir_{4} = 𒍝𒋢 nir_{5} = 𒍝𒅁 nir_{6} = 𒆗 nir_{7} = 𒍝𒂆	nur = 𒉪
n-		nes = 𒌋𒌋	nis = 𒌋𒌋 nís (nis_{2}) = 𒄑	nus = 𒉭
n-	naš = 𒌋𒌋	neš = 𒌋𒌋 néš (neš_{2}) = 𒄑	niš = 𒌋𒌋 níš (niš_{2}) = 𒄑	
n-	nat = 𒆳 nát (nat_{2}) = 𒄿		nit = 𒍑	
n-		neṭ = 𒍑	niṭ = 𒍑	
n-				nuz = 𒉭
p-	pab = 𒉽			
p-	pad = 𒉻 pád (pad_{2}) = 𒁁 pàd (pad_{3}) = 𒅆𒊒 pad_{4} = 𒅆 pad_{5} = 𒉽𒂊 pad_{6} = 𒉽𒅖		pid = 𒂍 píd (pid_{2}) = 𒁁	
p-	pag = 𒄷		pig = 𒋝	pug = 𒈮
p-	paḫ = 𒈜 pàḫ (paḫ_{3}) = 𒄷		piḫ = 𒈜	puḫ = 𒈜
p-	pak = 𒄷		pik = 𒋝	puk = 𒈮
p-	pal = 𒁄	pel = 𒉈 pél (pel_{2}) = 𒉋 pel_{5} = 𒉭	pil = 𒉈 píl (pil_{2}) = 𒉋 pìl (pil_{3}) = 𒄑𒉋 pil_{4} = 𒄑𒉈 pil_{5} = 𒉋 pil_{6} = 𒋓 pil_{7} = 𒄊 / 𒊊	pul = 𒇧 púl (pul_{2}) = 𒁔 pùl (pul_{3}) = 𒁄
p-				pum = 𒅤
p-	pan = 𒉼 pán (pan_{2}) = 𒈜 pàn (pan_{3}) = 𒅆		pin = 𒀳	
p-	pap = 𒄷			
p-	paq = 𒄷		piq = 𒋝	púq (puq_{2}) = 𒄷
p-	par = 𒌓 pár (par_{2}) = 𒁇 pàr (par_{3}) = 𒁖 par_{4} = 𒆦 par_{5} = 𒂟 par_{6} = 𒁈 par_{7} = 𒉌𒂟	per = 𒌓 pér (per_{2}) = 𒂟 pèr (per_{3}) = 𒄵	pir = 𒌓 pír (pir_{2}) = 𒂟 pìr (pir_{3}) = 𒄵 pir_{6} = 𒉆	pur = 𒁓 pur_{13} = 𒉽𒉽
p-			pis = 𒄫	pus = 𒄫
p-	paš = 𒄫	peš = 𒄫 péš (peš_{2}) = 𒋝𒋙𒁷, 𒉾 pèš (peš_{3}) = 𒈠 peš_{4} = 𒊯 peš_{5} = 𒆒 peš_{6} = 𒆓 peš_{7} = 𒌉 peš_{8} = 𒋗𒃶 peš_{9} = 𒌓𒀀 peš_{10} = 𒆠𒀀 peš_{11} = 𒄩 peš_{12} = 𒌓 peš_{13} = 𒊴	piš = 𒄫 píš (piš_{2}) = 𒋝𒋙𒁷, 𒉾 piš_{4} = 𒊯 piš_{5} = 𒆒 piš_{6} = 𒆓 piš_{10} = 𒆠𒀀	púš (puš_{2}) = 𒉽𒄬 pùš (puš_{3}) = 𒄫 puš_{4} = 𒂅
p-	pat = 𒉻 pát (pat_{2}) = 𒁁	pet = 𒂍 pét (pet_{2}) = 𒁁	pit = 𒂍 pít (pit_{2}) = 𒁁	
p-	paṭ = 𒉻 páṭ (pat_{2}) = 𒁁		piṭ = 𒂍	
q-	qab = 𒃮 qáb (qab_{2}) = 𒆏 qàb (qab_{3}) = 𒁕	qeb = 𒄒	qib = 𒄒	qub = 𒁺
q-	qad = 𒋗 qád (qad_{2}) = 𒋗𒈫 qàd (qad_{3}) = 𒃰 qad_{4} = 𒈨 qad_{6} = 𒆐		qid = 𒆤 qíd (qid_{2}) = 𒁍 qid_{4} = 𒃰	qud = 𒋻
q-	qal = 𒃲 qàl (qal_{3}) = 𒍇 qal_{4} = 𒆗	qel = 𒆸	qil = 𒆸 qíl (qil_{2}) = 𒄃	qul = 𒆰 qúl (qul_{2}) = 𒄢
q-	qam = 𒑲 qám (qam_{2}) = 𒄰		qim = 𒁶	qum = 𒄣 qúm (qum_{2}) = 𒉈 qùm (qum_{3}) = 𒈝
q-	qan = 𒃶 qán (qan_{2}) = 𒄀		qin = 𒆥	qun = 𒆲
q-	qap = 𒃮 qáp (qap_{2}) = 𒆏		qip = 𒄒	qup = 𒁺 qúp (qup_{2}) = 𒄽
q-	qaq = 𒆕		qiq = 𒈪𒉭	
q-	qar = 𒃼 qár (qar_{2}) = 𒋼𒀀 qàr (qar_{3}) = 𒃻 qar_{4} = 𒂶 qar_{5} = 𒄫	qer = 𒄫 qèr (qer_{3}) = 𒆸 qer_{5} = 𒃼 qer_{10} = 𒄩	qir = 𒄫 qír (qir_{2}) = 𒉐 qìr (qir_{3}) = 𒆸 qir_{6} = 𒀘 qir_{7} = 𒄊 qir_{8} = 𒄌 qir_{9} = 𒋃 qir_{10} = 𒄩	qur = 𒄥 qúr (qur_{2}) = 𒆳 qùr (qur_{3}) = 𒑲 qur_{4} = 𒉽
q-			qis = 𒆧	
q-			qiš = 𒆧	
q-	qat = 𒋗 qát (qat_{2}) = 𒋗𒈫 qàt (qat_{3}) = 𒃰 qat_{5} = 𒆒 qat_{6} = 𒆐 qat_{7} = 𒆑 qat_{8} = 𒆓	qet = 𒆤	qit = 𒆤 qít (qit_{2}) = 𒁍 qìt (qit_{3}) = 𒁁	qut = 𒋻
r-	rab = 𒊐 ráb (rab_{2}) = 𒃲 ràb (rab_{3}) = 𒈗 rab_{4} = 𒆗	reb = 𒆗	rib = 𒆗	rub = 𒆗
r-	rad = 𒋥 rád (rad_{2}) = 𒅐	red = 𒈩	rid = 𒈩	rud = 𒋥
r-	rag = 𒊩		rig = 𒋆 ríg (rig_{2}) = 𒍮 rìg (rig_{3}) = 𒋖𒄑 rig_{5} = 𒊑 rig_{6} = 𒊪 rig_{7} = 𒉺𒄸𒁺 rig_{8} = 𒉺𒄸 rig_{9} = 𒄸𒁺 rig_{10} = 𒉺𒁣 rig_{11} = 𒈩𒊒 rig_{13} = 𒈲	rug = 𒊿 rúg (rug_{2}) = 𒉆𒋢
r-	raḫ = 𒈛 ráḫ (raḫ_{2}) = 𒊏		riḫ = 𒈛	ruḫ = 𒈛
r-	rak = 𒊩		rik = 𒋆 rík (rik_{2}) = wikt: rik_{4} = 𒊿 rik_{13} = 𒈲	ruk = 𒊿
r-	ram = 𒉘 rám (ram_{2}) = 𒀸	rem = 𒆸 rém (rem_{2}) = 𒀖	rim = 𒆸 rím (rim_{2}) = 𒀖 rìm (rim_{3}) = 𒉈𒊒 rim_{4} = 𒁽 rim_{5} = 𒀸	rum = 𒀸 rúm (rum_{2}) = 𒉈𒊒 rùm (rum_{3}) = 𒉏
r-			rin = 𒆸 rín (rin_{2}) = 𒂟 rìn (rin_{3}) = 𒇔 rin_{4} = 𒈸 rin_{5} = 𒈕, 𒈕 rin_{6} = 𒆜	
r-	rap = 𒊐		rip = 𒆗	
r-	raq = 𒊩	req = 𒋆	riq = 𒋆 ríq (riq_{2}) = 𒍮	ruq = 𒊿
r-	ras = 𒆜	res = 𒊕	ris = 𒊕	
r-	raš = 𒆜 ráš (raš_{2}) = 𒌇	reš = 𒊕	riš = 𒊕	ruš = 𒄭𒄊
r-	rat = 𒋥		rit = 𒈩 rít (rit_{2}) = 𒋥	
r-	raṭ = 𒋥		riṭ = 𒈩	ruṭ = 𒋥
s-
s-			siu = 𒌣	
s-	sab = 𒉺𒅁		sib = 𒈨 síb (sib_{2}) = 𒉺𒇻 sìb (sib_{3}) = 𒍦	sub = 𒅢 súb (sub_{2}) = 𒁻 sùb (sub_{3}) = 𒄛 sub_{4} = 𒅡 sub_{5} = 𒈰 sub_{6} = 𒋳 sub_{7} = 𒊒
s-	sad = 𒆳 sád (sad_{2}) = 𒃪 sàd (sad_{3}) = 𒂿 sad_{4} = 𒃖	sed = 𒈻 séd (sed_{2}) = 𒋃 sèd (sed_{3}) = 𒈺, 𒀀𒈹 sed_{4} = 𒈹𒁲 sed_{5} = 𒀀𒈹𒁲 sed_{6} = 𒈹 sed_{7} = 𒈽 sed_{8} = 𒍝𒈹𒁲	sid = 𒈻 síd (sid_{2}) = 𒋃	sud = 𒋤 súd (sud_{2}) = 𒋥 sùd (sud_{3}) = 𒋢𒆳𒊒 sud_{4} = 𒁍 sud_{5} = 𒂬
s-	sag = 𒊕 ság (sag_{2}) = 𒉺𒃶 sàg (sag_{3}) = 𒉺 sag_{4} = 𒈗 sag_{5} = 𒋃 sag_{6} = 𒍠 sag_{7} = 𒃶 sag_{8} = 𒆗 sag_{9} = 𒊷 sag_{10} = 𒅆𒂟 sag_{11} = 𒆥	seg = 𒋝	sig = 𒋝 síg (sig_{2}) = 𒋠 sìg (sig_{3}) = 𒉺 sig_{4} = 𒋞 sig_{5} = 𒅆𒂟 sig_{6} = 𒊷 sig_{7} = 𒅊 sig_{8} = 𒃰𒋺𒄑 sig_{9} = 𒋛 sig_{10} = 𒋧 sig_{11} = 𒉺𒃶 sig_{12} = 𒈬 sig_{14} = 𒊾, 𒅲, 𒅝 sig_{15} = 𒆗 sig_{16} = 𒃶 sig_{17} = 𒄀 sig_{18} = 𒆥	sug = 𒆹 súg (sug_{2}) = 𒁻 sùg (sug_{3}) = 𒍇 sug_{4} = 𒋤 sug_{5} = 𒂅 sug_{6} = 𒋢 sug_{7} = 𒅲 sug_{8} = 𒇭 sug_{9} = 𒉭 sug_{10} = 𒁺𒁺
s-	saḫ = 𒆤 sáḫ (saḫ_{2}) = 𒋚 sàḫ (saḫ_{3}) = 𒂄 saḫ_{4} = 𒄗 saḫ_{6} = 𒄩𒀀 saḫ_{7} = 𒀄	seḫ = 𒋚 séḫ (seḫ_{2}) = 𒆤	siḫ = 𒋚 síḫ (siḫ_{2}) = 𒆤 siḫ_{4} = 𒈹 siḫ_{5} = 𒄗	suḫ = 𒈽 súḫ (suḫ_{2}) = 𒋦 sùḫ (suḫ_{3}) = 𒄗, 𒋦 suḫ_{4} = 𒆤 suḫ_{5} = 𒆪 suḫ_{6} = 𒁼 suḫ_{7} = 𒈬 suḫ_{10} = 𒈹
s-	sak = 𒊕 sàk (sak_{3}) = 𒉺 sak_{6} = 𒍠		sik = 𒋝 sík (sik_{2}) = 𒋠	suk = 𒆹 sùk (suk_{3}) = 𒍇 suk_{5} = 𒂅
s-	sal = 𒊩 sál (sal_{2}) = 𒁲 sàl (sal_{3}) = 𒉌 sal_{4} = 𒋡		sil = 𒋻 síl (sil_{2}) = 𒉣 sìl (sil_{3}) = 𒋡 sil_{5} = 𒂬 sil_{6} = 𒂢 sil_{7} = 𒂣 sil_{8} = 𒋓 sil_{9} = 𒂤 sil_{10} = 𒂴	sul = 𒂄 súl (sul_{2}) = 𒉌 sùl (sul_{3}) = 𒅾 sul_{4} = 𒇭
s-	sam = 𒌑 sám (sam_{2}) =		sim = 𒉆 sím (sim_{2}) = 𒋧 sìm (sim_{3}) = 𒁲 sim_{4} = 𒆸 sim_{5} = 𒍮	sum = 𒋧 súm (sum_{2}) = 𒍮 sùm (sum_{3}) = 𒋢 sum_{4} = 𒅾 sum_{5} = 𒍦 sum_{6} = 𒋳
s-	san = 𒊕 sán (san_{2}) = 𒊿 sàn (san_{3}) = 𒉓 san_{4} =		sin = 𒌍 sín (sin_{2}) = 𒉆 sìn (sin_{3}) = 𒋃, 𒂗𒍪	sun = 𒁁 sún (sun_{2}) = 𒄢 sùn (sun_{3}) = 𒋧 sun_{4} = 𒅾 sun_{5} = 𒁔 sun_{6} = 𒊿 sun_{7} = 𒆗
s-	sap = 𒉺𒅁 sáp (sap_{2}) = 𒂟 sàp (sap_{3}) = 𒉺𒇻		sip = 𒈨 síp (sip_{2}) = 𒉺𒇻 sìp (sip_{3}) = 𒍦 sip_{4} = 𒉺𒅁	súp (sup_{2}) = 𒁻
s-	saq = 𒊕		siq = 𒋝	suq = 𒆹
s-	sar = 𒊬 sár (sar_{2}) = 𒊹 sàr (sar_{3}) = 𒉌 sar_{4} = 𒋤 sar_{5} = 𒈹 sar_{6} = 𒇡 sar_{7} = 𒈜 sar_{8} = 𒋧	ser = 𒋤 sèr (ser_{3}) = 𒂡	sir = 𒋤 sír (sir_{2}) = 𒁍 sìr (sir_{3}) = 𒂡 sir_{4} = 𒋓 sir_{5} = 𒉡	sur = 𒋩 súr (sur_{2}) = 𒊨 sùr (sur_{3}) = 𒄮 sur_{4} = 𒊯 sur_{5} = 𒇲 sur_{6} = 𒆠𒃲 sur_{7} = 𒆠𒆕 sur_{8} = 𒇡 sur_{9} = 𒋪 sur_{10} = 𒈣𒅊 sur_{11} = 𒆪 sur_{12} = 𒇭 sur_{14} = 𒊕
s-	sas = 𒆠𒆗	ses = 𒋀	sis = 𒋀	sus = 𒈽 sús (sus_{2}) = 𒈹
s-			siš = 𒋀	suš = 𒆪 súš (suš_{2}) = 𒉌 sùš (suš_{3}) = 𒁍
s-	sat = 𒆳			sít (sit_{2}) = 𒋃
ṣ-	ṣab = 𒂟		ṣib = 𒍦 ṣíb (ṣib_{2}) = 𒍨	
ṣ-	ṣaḫ = 𒉈	ṣeḫ = 𒋚 ṣéḫ (ṣeḫ_{2}) = 𒉈	ṣiḫ = 𒋚 ṣíḫ (ṣiḫ_{2}) = 𒉈	
ṣ-	ṣak = 𒍠			
ṣ-	ṣal = 𒉌		ṣil = 𒉣 ṣíl (ṣil_{2}) = 𒈪 ṣìl (ṣil_{3}) = 𒀭𒊨 ṣil_{4} = 𒄑𒈪	
ṣ-			ṣim = 𒍮	ṣum = 𒍮
ṣ-			ṣin = 𒌍	
ṣ-	ṣap = 𒂟		ṣip = 𒍦	
ṣ-	ṣar = 𒇡 ṣár (ṣar_{2}) = 𒀫 ṣàr (ṣar_{3}) = 𒈲	ṣer = 𒈲	ṣir = 𒈲	ṣur = 𒀫 ṣúr (ṣur_{2}) = 𒈲
ṣ-			ṣiṣ = 𒁁	
ś-			śig = 𒋠	
ś-			śik = 𒋠	
ś-	śal = 𒊩			
ś-			śim = 𒋆 śím (śim_{2}) = 𒉆	śum = 𒋳 śúm (śum_{2}) = 𒋧
ś-			śín (śin_{2}) = 𒉆	
ś-	śar = 𒊬 śár (śar_{2}) = 𒊹 śàr (śar_{3}) = 𒈗			śur = 𒋩 śúr (śur_{2}) = 𒊨
š-	šab = 𒉺𒅁 šab_{4} = 𒈨 šab_{5} = 𒉺𒇻	šeb = 𒈨 šéb (šeb_{2}) = 𒊒	šib = 𒈨 šíb (šib_{2}) = 𒊒 šìb (šib_{3}) = 𒉺𒅁	šub = 𒊒 šùb (šub_{3}) = 𒉺𒅁 šub_{4} = 𒈰 šub_{5} = 𒍤𒆸 šub_{6} = 𒋃 šub_{7} = 𒍝𒈽 šub_{8} = 𒍝𒈹
š-	šad = 𒆳 šád (šad_{2}) = 𒈬 šàd (šad_{3}) = 𒃻	šed = 𒋃 šèd (šed_{3}) = 𒉫 šed_{4} = 𒆑 šed_{5} = 𒆒 / 𒆓 šed_{6} = 𒆪 šed_{7} = 𒈻 šed_{8} = 𒍝𒈹𒁲 šed_{9} = 𒈺 šed_{10} = 𒈹𒁲 šed_{11} = 𒀀𒈹𒁲 šed_{12} = 𒈹 šed_{13} = 𒈽 šed_{14} = 𒆂 šed_{15} = 𒅝 šed_{16} = 𒋞 šed_{17} = 𒅗	šid = 𒋃 šíd (šid_{2}) = 𒆐 šìd (šid_{3}) = 𒋺	šud = 𒋤 šud (šud_{2}) = 𒁍 šud (šud_{3}) = 𒆃 šud_{4} = 𒋃
š-	šag = 𒊕 šàg (šag_{3}) = 𒉺 šag_{4} = 𒊮 šag_{5} = 𒊷 šag_{6} = 𒋝	šèg (šeg_{3}) = 𒀀𒀭 šeg_{4} = 𒀀𒋙𒉀 šeg_{5} = 𒍋, 𒎆 šeg_{6} = 𒉈 šeg_{7} = 𒅎 šeg_{8} = 𒋙𒉀 šeg_{9} = 𒊾 šeg_{10} = 𒆂 šeg_{11} = 𒅝 šeg_{12} = 𒋞 šeg_{13} = 𒅗 šeg_{14} = 𒅎𒀀𒀭	šig = 𒋝 šíg (šig_{2}) = 𒋠 šig_{3} = 𒍋, 𒎆 šig_{6} = 𒋞	šug = 𒉻
š-	šaḫ = 𒋚 šáḫ (šaḫ_{2}) = 𒂄 šàḫ (šaḫ_{3}) = 𒆤	šeḫ = 𒋚	šiḫ = 𒋚 šíḫ (šiḫ_{2}) = 𒆤	šuḫ = 𒈽 šúḫ (šuḫ_{2}) = 𒋚
š-	šak = 𒊕 šak_{6} = 𒋝	šék (šek_{2}) = 𒋠	šik = 𒋝 šík (šik_{2}) = 𒋠 šik_{6} = 𒋞	šuk = 𒉻 šúk (šuk_{2}) = 𒈮 šùk (šuk_{3}) = 𒆹
š-	šal = 𒊩 šál (šal_{2}) = 𒋡 šàl (šal_{3}) = 𒉌 šal_{4} = 𒁲	šel = 𒋻 šel_{4} = 𒊩	šil = 𒋻 šìl (šil_{3}) = 𒌋 šil_{4} = 𒇺	šul = 𒂄 šùl (šul_{2}) = 𒁲
š-	šam = 𒌑 šám (šam_{2}) = šàm (šam_{3}) = 𒉓 šam_{4} = 𒉆	šem = 𒋆 šèm (šem_{3}) = 𒀚 šem_{4} = 𒀙 šem_{5} = 𒀘 šem_{6} = 𒀖𒋺, 𒀛 šem_{7} = 𒅖𒍏	šim = 𒋆 ším (šim_{2}) = 𒉆	šum = 𒋳 šúm (šum_{2}) = 𒋧 šùm (šum_{3}) = 𒈬 šum_{4} = 𒁁 šum_{5} = 𒁔
š-	šan = 𒉓 šán (šan_{2}) = 𒋳 šàn (šan_{3}) = 𒊿	šen = 𒊿 šén (šen_{2}) = 𒍏 šèn (šen_{3}) = 𒉆 šen_{4} = 𒁾 šen_{5} = 𒅖𒍏 šen_{6} = 𒅖	šin = 𒊿 šín (šin_{2}) = 𒈫	šun = 𒊿𒊿 šún (šun_{2}) = 𒀯 šùn (šun_{3}) = 𒄢 šun_{4} = 𒋧
š-	šap = 𒉺𒅁 šap_{5} = 𒉺𒇻		šip = 𒈨 šìp (šip_{3}) = 𒉺𒅁	šup = 𒊒 šúp (šup_{2}) = 𒀸 šùp (šup_{3}) = 𒉺𒅁
š-	šaq = 𒊕	šéq (šeq_{2}) = 𒋠	šiq = 𒋝 šíq (šiq_{2}) = 𒋠 šiq_{4} = 𒆂	šuq = 𒉻
š-	šar = 𒊬 šár (šar_{2}) = 𒊹 šàr (šar_{3}) = 𒈗 šar_{4} = 𒌋𒌋 šar_{5} = 𒅎 šar_{6} = 𒁈 šar_{7} = 𒋻 šar_{8} = 𒉌	šer = 𒋓 šér (šer_{2}) = 𒁍 šèr (šer_{3}) = 𒂡 šer_{4} = 𒍜 šer_{7} = 𒉪 šer_{9} = 𒊬 šer_{11} = 𒄊𒁇	šir = 𒋓 šír (šir_{2}) = 𒁍 šìr (šir_{3}) = 𒂡 šir_{4} = 𒍜 šir_{5} = 𒉡 šir_{6} = 𒌉 šir_{8} = 𒋤 šir_{9} = 𒊬 šir_{10} = 𒈲	šur = 𒋩 šúr (šur_{2}) = 𒊨 šùr (šur_{3}) = 𒋓 šur_{4} = 𒇳𒊬 šur_{5} = 𒇲𒆸 šur_{6} = 𒇳𒆸
š-	šas = 𒋀			
š-	šaṣ = 𒋀	šeṣ = 𒋀	šiṣ = 𒋀	
š-	šaš = 𒋀	šeš = 𒋀 šéš (šeš_{2}) = 𒋁 šèš (šeš_{3}) = 𒀅 šeš_{4} = 𒂞	šiš = 𒋀 šíš (šiš_{2}) = 𒋁	šuš = 𒌋 šúš (šuš_{2}) = 𒋙 šùš (šuš_{3}) = 𒅖 šuš_{4} = 𒋳 šuš_{5} = 𒇟 šuš_{6} = 𒇠
š-	šat = 𒆳 šàt (šat_{3}) = 𒃻	šet = 𒋃	šit = 𒋃	šut = 𒋤
š-	šaṭ = 𒆳		šiṭ = 𒋃	šuṭ = 𒋤
š-			šiz = 𒋀	šuz = 𒋤
t-	tab = 𒋰 táb (tab_{2}) = 𒄉 tab_{4} = 𒋰 tab_{5} = 𒍏	teb = 𒁳	tib = 𒁳	tub = 𒁾 túb (tub_{2}) = 𒂀
t-	tad = 𒋺		tid = 𒅎	tud = 𒌅 túd (tud_{2}) = 𒉺𒍜
t-	tag = 𒋳 tág (tag_{2}) = 𒁖 tàg (tag_{3}) = 𒉌𒂟 tag_{4} = 𒋺	tèg (teg_{3}) = 𒋼	tig = 𒄘 tíg (tig_{2}) = 𒉌 tig_{4} = 𒋾	tug = 𒌇 túg (tug_{2}) = 𒌆 tùg (tug_{3}) = 𒂁𒂁 tug_{4} = 𒇧 tug_{7} = 𒅎𒋺, 𒅏 tug_{8} = 𒂅
t-	taḫ = 𒈭 táḫ (taḫ_{2}) = 𒂃 / 𒃮 tàḫ (taḫ_{3}) = 𒈬			tuḫ = 𒃮 / 𒂃 túḫ (tuḫ_{2}) = 𒈭 tùḫ (tuḫ_{3}) = 𒈬
t-	tak = 𒋳 ták (tak_{2}) = 𒁖 tàk (tak_{3}) = 𒉌𒂟 tak_{4} = 𒋺		tik = 𒄘 tík (tik_{2}) = 𒉌	tuk = 𒌇 túk (tuk_{2}) = 𒌆 tùk (tuk_{3}) = 𒂁 tuk_{4} = 𒇧 tuk_{7} = 𒅎𒋺, 𒅏
t-	tal = 𒊑 tál (tal_{2}) = 𒉿 tàl (tal_{3}) = 𒀸 tal_{4} = 𒁹 tal_{5} = 𒆒𒆒, 𒆓𒆓	tel = 𒁁	til = 𒁁 tíl (til_{2}) = 𒇯 tìl (til_{3}) = 𒋾 til_{4} = 𒀸 til_{5} = 𒁹 til_{6} = 𒆒𒆒, 𒆓𒆓 til_{7} = 𒉿 til_{9} = 𒈦	tul = 𒌋𒌆 túl (tul_{2}) = 𒇥 tul_{4} = 𒌉 tul_{5} = 𒇯 tul_{6} = 𒂈 tul_{7} = 𒌪 tul_{8} = 𒇀
t-	tam = 𒌓 tám (tam_{2}) = 𒁮 tàm (tam_{3}) = 𒁴 tam_{4} = 𒌈	tem = 𒁴	tim = 𒁴 tím (tim_{2}) = 𒌈 tìm (tim_{3}) = 𒁷	tum = 𒌈 túm (tum_{2}) = 𒁺 tùm (tum_{3}) = 𒉐 tum_{4} = 𒉏 tum_{5} = 𒆪 tum_{8} = 𒁴 tum_{9} = 𒅎 tum_{10} = 𒁮 tum_{11} = 𒉑 tum_{12} = 𒌅
t-	tan = 𒆗 tán (tan_{2}) = 𒃞 tàn (tan_{3}) = 𒃩, 𒌨 tan_{4} = 𒃋 tan_{6} = 𒍕 tan_{7} = 𒃃	ten = 𒋼 tén (ten_{2}) = 𒁷 tèn (ten_{3}) = 𒂆	tin = 𒁷 tìn (tin_{3}) = 𒂆	tun = 𒄽 tún (tun_{2}) = 𒄸 tùn (tun_{3}) = 𒂅 tun_{4} = 𒂄
t-	tap = 𒋰	tep = 𒁳	tip = 𒁳	tup = 𒁾 túp (tup_{2}) = 𒂀
t-	taq = 𒋳 táq (taq_{2}) = 𒁖 tàq (taq_{3}) = 𒉌𒂟		tiq = 𒄘 tíq (tiq_{2}) = 𒉌	tuq = 𒌇 tùq (tuq_{3}) = 𒂁
t-	tar = 𒋻 tár (tar_{2}) = 𒁯 tàr (tar_{3}) = 𒁰 tar_{5} = 𒄀	ter = 𒌁 tér (ter_{2}) = 𒋻 tèr (ter_{3}) = 𒁯 ter_{4} = 𒋛𒀀 ter_{5} = 𒉼	tir = 𒌁 tír (tir_{2}) = 𒋻 tìr (tir_{3}) = 𒁯 tir_{4} = 𒋛𒀀 tir_{5} = 𒉼	tur = 𒌉 túr (tur_{2}) = 𒄙 tùr (tur_{3}) = 𒉣𒇬 tur_{4} = 𒄒 tur_{5} = 𒌅 tur_{6} = 𒆸 tur_{7} = 𒆪 tur_{8} = 𒁍
t-	tas = 𒌨	tés (tes_{2}) = 𒌨	tis = 𒁹 tís (tis_{2}) = 𒌨	
t-	taṣ = 𒌨	téṣ (teṣ_{2}) = 𒌨	tíṣ (tis_{2}) = 𒌨	
t-	taš = 𒌨 táš (taš_{2}) = 𒁹 tàš (taš_{3}) = 𒀾	téš (teš_{2}) = 𒌨	tiš = 𒁹 tíš (tiš_{2}) = 𒌨	tuš = 𒆪
t-	tat = 𒋺			
t-	taz = 𒌨	tiz = 𒁹 tíz (tiz_{2}) = 𒌨		
ṭ-	ṭab = 𒋰 ṭàb (ṭab_{3}) = 𒁳 ṭab_{4} = 𒍏 ṭab_{6} = 𒄭		ṭib = 𒁳 ṭíb (ṭib_{2}) = 𒄭	ṭub = 𒁾 ṭúb (ṭub_{2}) = 𒂀
ṭ-	ṭad = 𒋺			
ṭ-	ṭaḫ = 𒈭 ṭáḫ (ṭaḫ_{2}) = 𒂃 / 𒃮			ṭuḫ = 𒂃 / 𒃮
ṭ-	ṭak = 𒁖			ṭug = 𒂁
ṭ-				ṭuk = 𒂁
ṭ-	ṭal = 𒊑		ṭil = 𒀸 ṭíl (ṭil_{2}) = 𒁁	ṭul = 𒇥 ṭùl (ṭul_{3}) = 𒇯
ṭ-	ṭam = 𒁮 ṭám (ṭam_{2}) = 𒌓	ṭém (ṭem_{2}) = 𒁶	ṭim = 𒁴 ṭím (ṭim_{2}) = 𒁶	ṭum = 𒌈
ṭ-	ṭan = 𒆗		ṭin = 𒁷	
ṭ-	ṭap = 𒋰	ṭep = 𒁳	ṭip = 𒁳	ṭup = 𒁾 ṭúp (ṭup_{2}) = 𒂀
ṭ-	ṭar = 𒋻 ṭár (ṭar_{2}) = 𒁯 ṭàr (ṭar_{3}) = 𒁰	ṭer = 𒋛𒀀 ṭer_{5} = 𒌁	ṭir = 𒋛𒀀 ṭír (ṭir_{2}) = 𒋻 ṭìr (ṭir_{3}) = 𒋩 ṭir_{4} = 𒁯 ṭir_{5} = 𒌁	ṭur = 𒄙 ṭúr (ṭur_{2}) = 𒆪 ṭùr (ṭur_{3}) = 𒌉 ṭur_{4} = 𒄒 ṭur_{5} = 𒀀
ṭ-			ṭiš = 𒁹	
ṭ-	ṭaṭ = 𒋺			
w-				wuk = 𒈮
w-			wil = 𒅖	
w-	wan = 𒌋𒌋			
w-	war = 𒁇 wár (war_{2}) = 𒈥 wàr (war_{3}) = 𒀴			wir = 𒄊|
w-	waš = 𒈦		wiš = 𒈨𒌍	wuš = 𒈲
z-	zab = 𒂟	zeb = 𒍦	zib = 𒍦 zíb (zib_{2}) = 𒍨 zìb (zib_{3}) = 𒄞 zib_{4} = 𒅗	zub = 𒆛 zúb (zub_{2}) = 𒍦
z-			zid = 𒍣 zíd (zid_{2}) = 𒂠	
z-	zag = 𒍠 zág (zag_{2}) = 𒉺 zàg (zag_{3}) = 𒋃		zig = 𒍨 zíg (zig_{2}) = 𒋝 zìg (zig_{3}) = 𒍣	zug = 𒆹 zúg (zug_{2}) = 𒅗 zùg (zug_{3}) = 𒊢 zug_{4} = 𒅲
z-	zaḫ = 𒉈 záḫ (zaḫ_{2}) = 𒄩𒀀 zàḫ (zaḫ_{3}) = 𒀄		ziḫ = 𒄗	zuḫ = 𒅗
z-	zak = 𒍠 zák (zak_{2}) = 𒉺	zek = 𒍨	zik = 𒍨 zík (zik_{2}) = 𒋝	zuk = 𒆹
z-	zal = 𒉌 zál (zal_{2}) = 𒇡	zel = 𒉣	zil = 𒉣 zíl (zil_{2}) = 𒋳	zul = 𒂄
z-				zum = 𒍮 zúm (zum_{2}) = 𒊪
z-	zap = 𒂟 záp (zap_{2}) = 𒆪		zip = 𒍦	
z-	zaq = 𒍠 záq (zaq_{2}) = 𒉺 zaq_{4} = 𒍨		ziq = 𒍨 zíq (ziq_{2}) = 𒋝	zuq = 𒆹
z-	zar = 𒇡 zár (zar_{2}) = 𒉌 zàr (zar_{3}) = 𒋧 zar_{4} = 𒆰 zar_{5} = 𒁁 zar_{6} = 𒁁𒀸	zer = 𒆰 zèr (zer_{3}) = 𒈲	zir = 𒆰 zír (zir_{2}) = 𒂠𒅗 zìr (zir_{3}) = 𒈲	zur = 𒀫 zúr (zur_{2}) = 𒋪 zùr (zur_{3}) = 𒈣𒅊 zur_{4} = 𒇡 zur_{5} = 𒇲 zur_{8} = 𒊭
z-			zis = 𒁁	
z-	zaz = 𒁁	zez = 𒁁	ziz = 𒁁 zíz (ziz_{2}) = 𒀾 zìz (ziz_{3}) = 𒄮 ziz_{4} = 𒄓 ziz_{5} = 𒋳	

=== Numerals ===
The Sumerians used a base-60 numerical system. A number, such as "70", would be represented with the digit for "60" (𒁹) and the digit for "10" (𒌋): 𒁹𒌋. It's important to mention that the number for "60" is the same as the number for "1"; the reason this number isn't read as "11" is because of the order of the numbers: 60 then 10, not 10 then 60.

== Usage ==
An example: King Shulgi foundation tablet
(c. 2094–2047 BC)

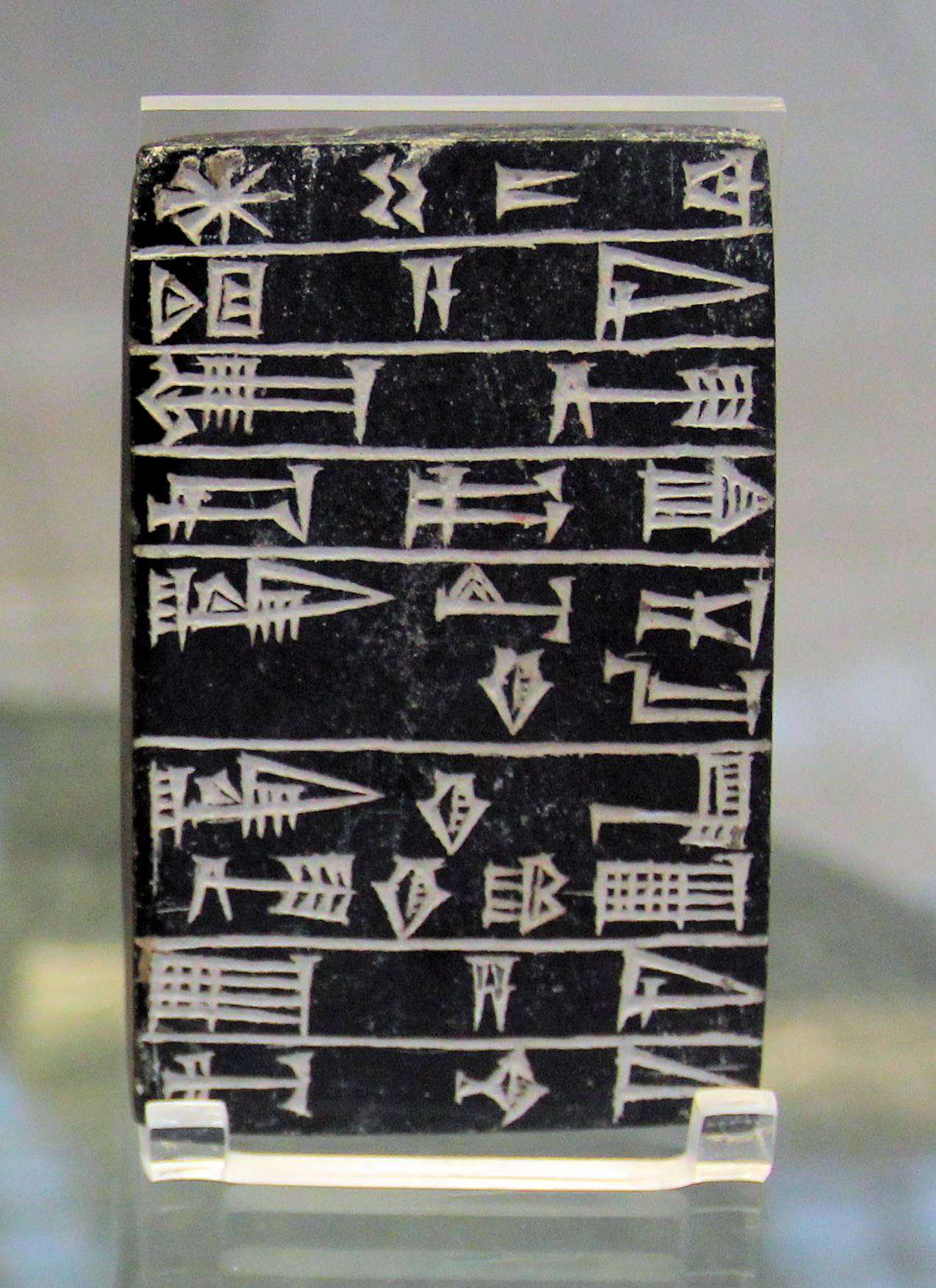
𒀭 𒐏𒋰𒁀
𒎏𒀀𒉌
𒂄𒄀
𒍑𒆗𒂵
𒈗 𒋀𒀊𒆠𒈠
𒈗𒆠𒂗
𒄀𒆠𒌵𒆤
𒂍𒀀𒉌
𒈬𒈾𒆕

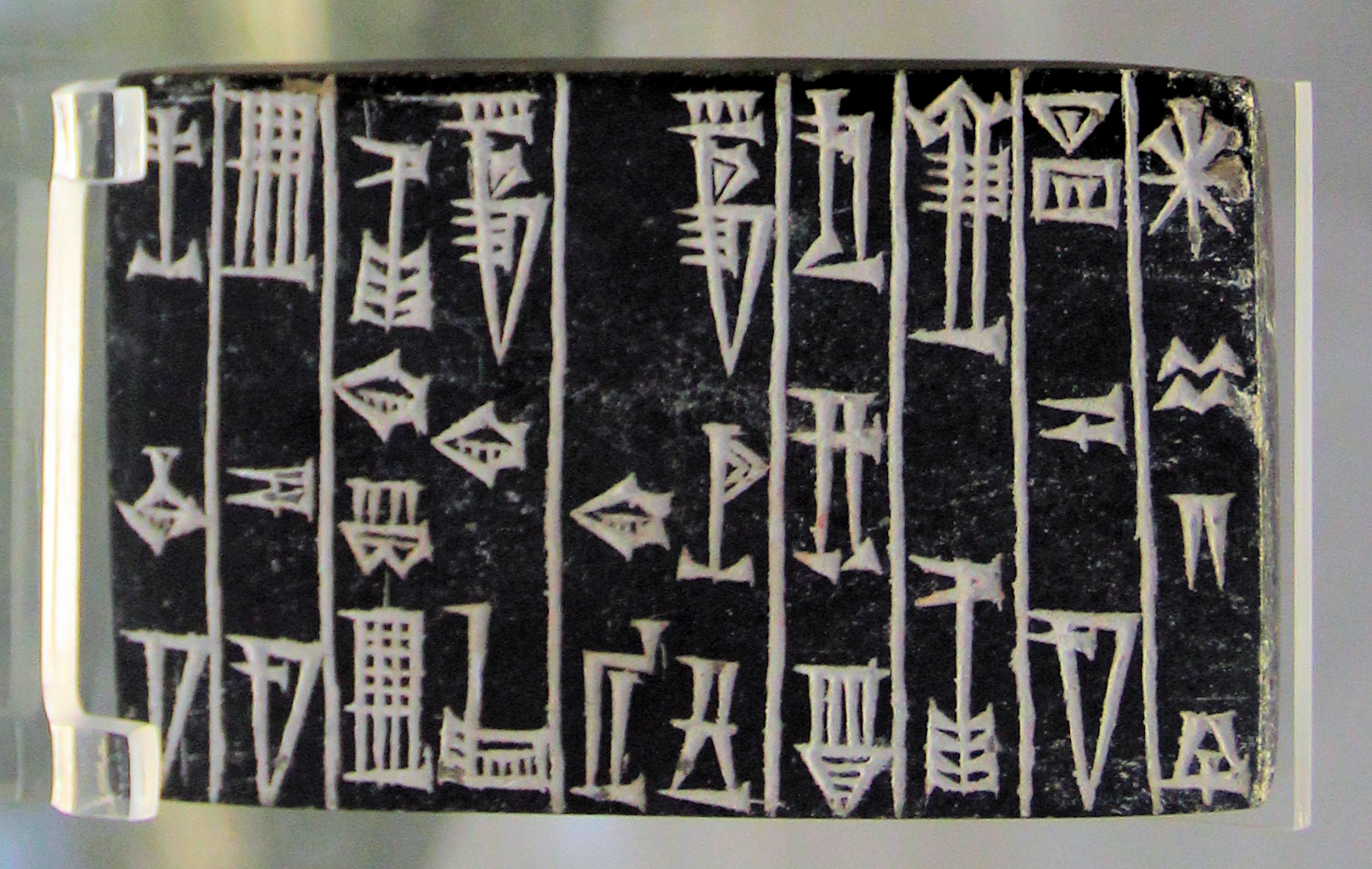

^{D}Nimintabba	"For Nimintabba"
NIN-a-ni	"his Lady"
SHUL-GI	"Shulgi"
NITAH KALAG-ga	"the mighty man"
LUGAL URIM^{KI}-ma	"King of Ur"
GAL ki-en-	"King of Sum-"
-gi ki-URI-ke	"-er and Akkad"
É-a-ni	"her Temple"
mu-na-DU	"he built"

Foundation tablet of king Shulgi (c. 2094–2047 BC), for the Temple of Nimintabba in Ur. ME 118560 British Museum. Inscription "For his Lady Nimintabba, Shulgi the mighty man, King of Ur and King of Sumer and Akkad, has built her Temple": Traditional cuneiforms were written vertically, but modern transcription is based on the "rotated" script adopted in the 2nd millennium BC.

Cuneiform script was used in many ways in ancient Mesopotamia. Besides the well-known clay tablets and stone inscriptions, cuneiform was also written on wax boards. One example from the 8th century BC was found at Nimrud. The wax contained toxic amounts of arsenic. It was used to record laws, like the Code of Hammurabi. It was also used for recording maps, compiling medical manuals, and documenting religious stories and beliefs, among other uses. In particular it is thought to have been used to prepare surveying data and draft inscriptions for Kassite stone kudurru. Studies by researcher such as Claus Wilcke and Dominique Charpin suggest that cuneiform literacy was not reserved solely for the elite but was common for average citizens.

According to Niek Veldhuis, cuneiform script was used at a variety of literacy levels: average citizens needed only a basic, functional knowledge of cuneiform script to write personal letters and business documents. Citizens with a higher degree of literacy put the script to more technical use, listing medicines and diagnoses and writing mathematical equations. Scholars held the highest literacy level of cuneiform and mostly focused on writing as a complex skill and an art form.

=== Modern usage ===
Cuneiform is occasionally used nowadays as inspiration for logos.

Cuneiform ama-gi, literally "return to the mother", loosely translated as "liberty", is the logo of Liberty Fund.

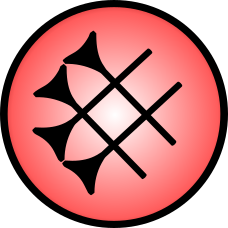
The central element of the GigaMesh Software Framework logo is the sign 𒆜 (kaskal) meaning "street" or "road junction".

== Unicode ==
As of version 18.0, the following ranges are assigned to the Sumero-Akkadian Cuneiform script in the Unicode Standard:

- U+12000–U+123FF (922 assigned characters) Cuneiform
- U+12400–U+1247F (116 assigned characters) Cuneiform Numbers and Punctuation
- U+12480–U+1254F (196 assigned characters) Early Dynastic Cuneiform
- U+12550–U+1268F (311 assigned characters) Archaic Cuneiform Numerals

The final proposal for Unicode encoding of the script was submitted by two cuneiform scholars working with an experienced Unicode proposal writer in June 2004. The base character inventory is derived from the list of Ur III signs compiled by the Cuneiform Digital Library Initiative of UCLA based on the inventories of Miguel Civil, Rykle Borger (2003) and Robert Englund. Rather than opting for a direct ordering by glyph shape and complexity, according to the numbering of an existing catalog, the Unicode order of glyphs was based on the Latin alphabetic order of their "last" Sumerian transliteration as a practical approximation. Once in Unicode, glyphs can be automatically processed into segmented transliterations.

Cuneiform^{[1]}^{[2]} Official Unicode Consortium code chart (PDF)
	0	1	2	3	4	5	6	7	8	9	A	B	C	D	E	F
U+1200x	𒀀	𒀁	𒀂	𒀃	𒀄	𒀅	𒀆	𒀇	𒀈	𒀉	𒀊	𒀋	𒀌	𒀍	𒀎	𒀏
U+1201x	𒀐	𒀑	𒀒	𒀓	𒀔	𒀕	𒀖	𒀗	𒀘	𒀙	𒀚	𒀛	𒀜	𒀝	𒀞	𒀟
U+1202x	𒀠	𒀡	𒀢	𒀣	𒀤	𒀥	𒀦	𒀧	𒀨	𒀩	𒀪	𒀫	𒀬	𒀭	𒀮	𒀯
U+1203x	𒀰	𒀱	𒀲	𒀳	𒀴	𒀵	𒀶	𒀷	𒀸	𒀹	𒀺	𒀻	𒀼	𒀽	𒀾	𒀿
U+1204x	𒁀	𒁁	𒁂	𒁃	𒁄	𒁅	𒁆	𒁇	𒁈	𒁉	𒁊	𒁋	𒁌	𒁍	𒁎	𒁏
U+1205x	𒁐	𒁑	𒁒	𒁓	𒁔	𒁕	𒁖	𒁗	𒁘	𒁙	𒁚	𒁛	𒁜	𒁝	𒁞	𒁟
U+1206x	𒁠	𒁡	𒁢	𒁣	𒁤	𒁥	𒁦	𒁧	𒁨	𒁩	𒁪	𒁫	𒁬	𒁭	𒁮	𒁯
U+1207x	𒁰	𒁱	𒁲	𒁳	𒁴	𒁵	𒁶	𒁷	𒁸	𒁹	𒁺	𒁻	𒁼	𒁽	𒁾	𒁿
U+1208x	𒂀	𒂁	𒂂	𒂃	𒂄	𒂅	𒂆	𒂇	𒂈	𒂉	𒂊	𒂋	𒂌	𒂍	𒂎	𒂏
U+1209x	𒂐	𒂑	𒂒	𒂓	𒂔	𒂕	𒂖	𒂗	𒂘	𒂙	𒂚	𒂛	𒂜	𒂝	𒂞	𒂟
U+120Ax	𒂠	𒂡	𒂢	𒂣	𒂤	𒂥	𒂦	𒂧	𒂨	𒂩	𒂪	𒂫	𒂬	𒂭	𒂮	𒂯
U+120Bx	𒂰	𒂱	𒂲	𒂳	𒂴	𒂵	𒂶	𒂷	𒂸	𒂹	𒂺	𒂻	𒂼	𒂽	𒂾	𒂿
U+120Cx	𒃀	𒃁	𒃂	𒃃	𒃄	𒃅	𒃆	𒃇	𒃈	𒃉	𒃊	𒃋	𒃌	𒃍	𒃎	𒃏
U+120Dx	𒃐	𒃑	𒃒	𒃓	𒃔	𒃕	𒃖	𒃗	𒃘	𒃙	𒃚	𒃛	𒃜	𒃝	𒃞	𒃟
U+120Ex	𒃠	𒃡	𒃢	𒃣	𒃤	𒃥	𒃦	𒃧	𒃨	𒃩	𒃪	𒃫	𒃬	𒃭	𒃮	𒃯
U+120Fx	𒃰	𒃱	𒃲	𒃳	𒃴	𒃵	𒃶	𒃷	𒃸	𒃹	𒃺	𒃻	𒃼	𒃽	𒃾	𒃿
U+1210x	𒄀	𒄁	𒄂	𒄃	𒄄	𒄅	𒄆	𒄇	𒄈	𒄉	𒄊	𒄋	𒄌	𒄍	𒄎	𒄏
U+1211x	𒄐	𒄑	𒄒	𒄓	𒄔	𒄕	𒄖	𒄗	𒄘	𒄙	𒄚	𒄛	𒄜	𒄝	𒄞	𒄟
U+1212x	𒄠	𒄡	𒄢	𒄣	𒄤	𒄥	𒄦	𒄧	𒄨	𒄩	𒄪	𒄫	𒄬	𒄭	𒄮	𒄯
U+1213x	𒄰	𒄱	𒄲	𒄳	𒄴	𒄵	𒄶	𒄷	𒄸	𒄹	𒄺	𒄻	𒄼	𒄽	𒄾	𒄿
U+1214x	𒅀	𒅁	𒅂	𒅃	𒅄	𒅅	𒅆	𒅇	𒅈	𒅉	𒅊	𒅋	𒅌	𒅍	𒅎	𒅏
U+1215x	𒅐	𒅑	𒅒	𒅓	𒅔	𒅕	𒅖	𒅗	𒅘	𒅙	𒅚	𒅛	𒅜	𒅝	𒅞	𒅟
U+1216x	𒅠	𒅡	𒅢	𒅣	𒅤	𒅥	𒅦	𒅧	𒅨	𒅩	𒅪	𒅫	𒅬	𒅭	𒅮	𒅯
U+1217x	𒅰	𒅱	𒅲	𒅳	𒅴	𒅵	𒅶	𒅷	𒅸	𒅹	𒅺	𒅻	𒅼	𒅽	𒅾	𒅿
U+1218x	𒆀	𒆁	𒆂	𒆃	𒆄	𒆅	𒆆	𒆇	𒆈	𒆉	𒆊	𒆋	𒆌	𒆍	𒆎	𒆏
U+1219x	𒆐	𒆑	𒆒	𒆓	𒆔	𒆕	𒆖	𒆗	𒆘	𒆙	𒆚	𒆛	𒆜	𒆝	𒆞	𒆟
U+121Ax	𒆠	𒆡	𒆢	𒆣	𒆤	𒆥	𒆦	𒆧	𒆨	𒆩	𒆪	𒆫	𒆬	𒆭	𒆮	𒆯
U+121Bx	𒆰	𒆱	𒆲	𒆳	𒆴	𒆵	𒆶	𒆷	𒆸	𒆹	𒆺	𒆻	𒆼	𒆽	𒆾	𒆿
U+121Cx	𒇀	𒇁	𒇂	𒇃	𒇄	𒇅	𒇆	𒇇	𒇈	𒇉	𒇊	𒇋	𒇌	𒇍	𒇎	𒇏
U+121Dx	𒇐	𒇑	𒇒	𒇓	𒇔	𒇕	𒇖	𒇗	𒇘	𒇙	𒇚	𒇛	𒇜	𒇝	𒇞	𒇟
U+121Ex	𒇠	𒇡	𒇢	𒇣	𒇤	𒇥	𒇦	𒇧	𒇨	𒇩	𒇪	𒇫	𒇬	𒇭	𒇮	𒇯
U+121Fx	𒇰	𒇱	𒇲	𒇳	𒇴	𒇵	𒇶	𒇷	𒇸	𒇹	𒇺	𒇻	𒇼	𒇽	𒇾	𒇿
U+1220x	𒈀	𒈁	𒈂	𒈃	𒈄	𒈅	𒈆	𒈇	𒈈	𒈉	𒈊	𒈋	𒈌	𒈍	𒈎	𒈏
U+1221x	𒈐	𒈑	𒈒	𒈓	𒈔	𒈕	𒈖	𒈗	𒈘	𒈙	𒈚	𒈛	𒈜	𒈝	𒈞	𒈟
U+1222x	𒈠	𒈡	𒈢	𒈣	𒈤	𒈥	𒈦	𒈧	𒈨	𒈩	𒈪	𒈫	𒈬	𒈭	𒈮	𒈯
U+1223x	𒈰	𒈱	𒈲	𒈳	𒈴	𒈵	𒈶	𒈷	𒈸	𒈹	𒈺	𒈻	𒈼	𒈽	𒈾	𒈿
U+1224x	𒉀	𒉁	𒉂	𒉃	𒉄	𒉅	𒉆	𒉇	𒉈	𒉉	𒉊	𒉋	𒉌	𒉍	𒉎	𒉏
U+1225x	𒉐	𒉑	𒉒	𒉓	𒉔	𒉕	𒉖	𒉗	𒉘	𒉙	𒉚	𒉛	𒉜	𒉝	𒉞	𒉟
U+1226x	𒉠	𒉡	𒉢	𒉣	𒉤	𒉥	𒉦	𒉧	𒉨	𒉩	𒉪	𒉫	𒉬	𒉭	𒉮	𒉯
U+1227x	𒉰	𒉱	𒉲	𒉳	𒉴	𒉵	𒉶	𒉷	𒉸	𒉹	𒉺	𒉻	𒉼	𒉽	𒉾	𒉿
U+1228x	𒊀	𒊁	𒊂	𒊃	𒊄	𒊅	𒊆	𒊇	𒊈	𒊉	𒊊	𒊋	𒊌	𒊍	𒊎	𒊏
U+1229x	𒊐	𒊑	𒊒	𒊓	𒊔	𒊕	𒊖	𒊗	𒊘	𒊙	𒊚	𒊛	𒊜	𒊝	𒊞	𒊟
U+122Ax	𒊠	𒊡	𒊢	𒊣	𒊤	𒊥	𒊦	𒊧	𒊨	𒊩	𒊪	𒊫	𒊬	𒊭	𒊮	𒊯
U+122Bx	𒊰	𒊱	𒊲	𒊳	𒊴	𒊵	𒊶	𒊷	𒊸	𒊹	𒊺	𒊻	𒊼	𒊽	𒊾	𒊿
U+122Cx	𒋀	𒋁	𒋂	𒋃	𒋄	𒋅	𒋆	𒋇	𒋈	𒋉	𒋊	𒋋	𒋌	𒋍	𒋎	𒋏
U+122Dx	𒋐	𒋑	𒋒	𒋓	𒋔	𒋕	𒋖	𒋗	𒋘	𒋙	𒋚	𒋛	𒋜	𒋝	𒋞	𒋟
U+122Ex	𒋠	𒋡	𒋢	𒋣	𒋤	𒋥	𒋦	𒋧	𒋨	𒋩	𒋪	𒋫	𒋬	𒋭	𒋮	𒋯
U+122Fx	𒋰	𒋱	𒋲	𒋳	𒋴	𒋵	𒋶	𒋷	𒋸	𒋹	𒋺	𒋻	𒋼	𒋽	𒋾	𒋿
U+1230x	𒌀	𒌁	𒌂	𒌃	𒌄	𒌅	𒌆	𒌇	𒌈	𒌉	𒌊	𒌋	𒌌	𒌍	𒌎	𒌏
U+1231x	𒌐	𒌑	𒌒	𒌓	𒌔	𒌕	𒌖	𒌗	𒌘	𒌙	𒌚	𒌛	𒌜	𒌝	𒌞	𒌟
U+1232x	𒌠	𒌡	𒌢	𒌣	𒌤	𒌥	𒌦	𒌧	𒌨	𒌩	𒌪	𒌫	𒌬	𒌭	𒌮	𒌯
U+1233x	𒌰	𒌱	𒌲	𒌳	𒌴	𒌵	𒌶	𒌷	𒌸	𒌹	𒌺	𒌻	𒌼	𒌽	𒌾	𒌿
U+1234x	𒍀	𒍁	𒍂	𒍃	𒍄	𒍅	𒍆	𒍇	𒍈	𒍉	𒍊	𒍋	𒍌	𒍍	𒍎	𒍏
U+1235x	𒍐	𒍑	𒍒	𒍓	𒍔	𒍕	𒍖	𒍗	𒍘	𒍙	𒍚	𒍛	𒍜	𒍝	𒍞	𒍟
U+1236x	𒍠	𒍡	𒍢	𒍣	𒍤	𒍥	𒍦	𒍧	𒍨	𒍩	𒍪	𒍫	𒍬	𒍭	𒍮	𒍯
U+1237x	𒍰	𒍱	𒍲	𒍳	𒍴	𒍵	𒍶	𒍷	𒍸	𒍹	𒍺	𒍻	𒍼	𒍽	𒍾	𒍿
U+1238x	𒎀	𒎁	𒎂	𒎃	𒎄	𒎅	𒎆	𒎇	𒎈	𒎉	𒎊	𒎋	𒎌	𒎍	𒎎	𒎏
U+1239x	𒎐	𒎑	𒎒	𒎓	𒎔	𒎕	𒎖	𒎗	𒎘	𒎙						
U+123Ax																
U+123Bx																
U+123Cx																
U+123Dx																
U+123Ex																
U+123Fx																
Notes 1.As of Unicode version 18.0 2.Grey areas indicate non-assigned code points

Cuneiform Numbers and Punctuation^{[1]} Official Unicode Consortium code chart (PDF)
	0	1	2	3	4	5	6	7	8	9	A	B	C	D	E	F
U+1240x	𒐀	𒐁	𒐂	𒐃	𒐄	𒐅	𒐆	𒐇	𒐈	𒐉	𒐊	𒐋	𒐌	𒐍	𒐎	𒐏
U+1241x	𒐐	𒐑	𒐒	𒐓	𒐔	𒐕	𒐖	𒐗	𒐘	𒐙	𒐚	𒐛	𒐜	𒐝	𒐞	𒐟
U+1242x	𒐠	𒐡	𒐢	𒐣	𒐤	𒐥	𒐦	𒐧	𒐨	𒐩	𒐪	𒐫	𒐬	𒐭	𒐮	𒐯
U+1243x	𒐰	𒐱	𒐲	𒐳	𒐴	𒐵	𒐶	𒐷	𒐸	𒐹	𒐺	𒐻	𒐼	𒐽	𒐾	𒐿
U+1244x	𒑀	𒑁	𒑂	𒑃	𒑄	𒑅	𒑆	𒑇	𒑈	𒑉	𒑊	𒑋	𒑌	𒑍	𒑎	𒑏
U+1245x	𒑐	𒑑	𒑒	𒑓	𒑔	𒑕	𒑖	𒑗	𒑘	𒑙	𒑚	𒑛	𒑜	𒑝	𒑞	𒑟
U+1246x	𒑠	𒑡	𒑢	𒑣	𒑤	𒑥	𒑦	𒑧	𒑨	𒑩	𒑪	𒑫	𒑬	𒑭	𒑮	𒑯
U+1247x	𒑰	𒑱	𒑲	𒑳	𒑴	𒑵	𒑶	𒑷	𒑸	𒑹	𒑺	𒑻	𒑼	𒑽	𒑾	𒑿
Notes 1.As of Unicode version 18.0

Early Dynastic Cuneiform^{[1]}^{[2]} Official Unicode Consortium code chart (PDF)
	0	1	2	3	4	5	6	7	8	9	A	B	C	D	E	F
U+1248x	𒒀	𒒁	𒒂	𒒃	𒒄	𒒅	𒒆	𒒇	𒒈	𒒉	𒒊	𒒋	𒒌	𒒍	𒒎	𒒏
U+1249x	𒒐	𒒑	𒒒	𒒓	𒒔	𒒕	𒒖	𒒗	𒒘	𒒙	𒒚	𒒛	𒒜	𒒝	𒒞	𒒟
U+124Ax	𒒠	𒒡	𒒢	𒒣	𒒤	𒒥	𒒦	𒒧	𒒨	𒒩	𒒪	𒒫	𒒬	𒒭	𒒮	𒒯
U+124Bx	𒒰	𒒱	𒒲	𒒳	𒒴	𒒵	𒒶	𒒷	𒒸	𒒹	𒒺	𒒻	𒒼	𒒽	𒒾	𒒿
U+124Cx	𒓀	𒓁	𒓂	𒓃	𒓄	𒓅	𒓆	𒓇	𒓈	𒓉	𒓊	𒓋	𒓌	𒓍	𒓎	𒓏
U+124Dx	𒓐	𒓑	𒓒	𒓓	𒓔	𒓕	𒓖	𒓗	𒓘	𒓙	𒓚	𒓛	𒓜	𒓝	𒓞	𒓟
U+124Ex	𒓠	𒓡	𒓢	𒓣	𒓤	𒓥	𒓦	𒓧	𒓨	𒓩	𒓪	𒓫	𒓬	𒓭	𒓮	𒓯
U+124Fx	𒓰	𒓱	𒓲	𒓳	𒓴	𒓵	𒓶	𒓷	𒓸	𒓹	𒓺	𒓻	𒓼	𒓽	𒓾	𒓿
U+1250x	𒔀	𒔁	𒔂	𒔃	𒔄	𒔅	𒔆	𒔇	𒔈	𒔉	𒔊	𒔋	𒔌	𒔍	𒔎	𒔏
U+1251x	𒔐	𒔑	𒔒	𒔓	𒔔	𒔕	𒔖	𒔗	𒔘	𒔙	𒔚	𒔛	𒔜	𒔝	𒔞	𒔟
U+1252x	𒔠	𒔡	𒔢	𒔣	𒔤	𒔥	𒔦	𒔧	𒔨	𒔩	𒔪	𒔫	𒔬	𒔭	𒔮	𒔯
U+1253x	𒔰	𒔱	𒔲	𒔳	𒔴	𒔵	𒔶	𒔷	𒔸	𒔹	𒔺	𒔻	𒔼	𒔽	𒔾	𒔿
U+1254x	𒕀	𒕁	𒕂	𒕃												
Notes 1.As of Unicode version 18.0 2.Grey areas indicate non-assigned code points

Archaic Cuneiform Numerals^{[1]}^{[2]} Official Unicode Consortium code chart (PDF)
	0	1	2	3	4	5	6	7	8	9	A	B	C	D	E	F
U+1255x	𒕐	𒕑	𒕒	𒕓	𒕔	𒕕	𒕖	𒕗	𒕘	𒕙	𒕚	𒕛	𒕜	𒕝	𒕞	𒕟
U+1256x	𒕠	𒕡	𒕢	𒕣	𒕤	𒕥	𒕦	𒕧	𒕨	𒕩	𒕪	𒕫	𒕬	𒕭	𒕮	𒕯
U+1257x	𒕰	𒕱	𒕲	𒕳	𒕴	𒕵	𒕶	𒕷	𒕸	𒕹	𒕺	𒕻	𒕼	𒕽	𒕾	𒕿
U+1258x	𒖀	𒖁	𒖂	𒖃	𒖄	𒖅	𒖆	𒖇	𒖈	𒖉	𒖊	𒖋	𒖌	𒖍	𒖎	𒖏
U+1259x	𒖐	𒖑	𒖒	𒖓	𒖔	𒖕	𒖖	𒖗	𒖘	𒖙	𒖚	𒖛	𒖜	𒖝	𒖞	𒖟
U+125Ax	𒖠	𒖡	𒖢	𒖣	𒖤	𒖥	𒖦	𒖧	𒖨	𒖩	𒖪	𒖫	𒖬	𒖭	𒖮	𒖯
U+125Bx	𒖰	𒖱	𒖲	𒖳	𒖴	𒖵	𒖶	𒖷	𒖸	𒖹	𒖺	𒖻	𒖼	𒖽	𒖾	𒖿
U+125Cx	𒗀	𒗁	𒗂	𒗃	𒗄	𒗅	𒗆	𒗇	𒗈	𒗉	𒗊	𒗋	𒗌	𒗍	𒗎	𒗏
U+125Dx	𒗐	𒗑	𒗒	𒗓	𒗔	𒗕	𒗖	𒗗	𒗘	𒗙	𒗚	𒗛	𒗜	𒗝	𒗞	𒗟
U+125Ex	𒗠	𒗡	𒗢	𒗣	𒗤	𒗥	𒗦	𒗧	𒗨	𒗩	𒗪	𒗫	𒗬	𒗭	𒗮	𒗯
U+125Fx	𒗰	𒗱	𒗲	𒗳	𒗴	𒗵	𒗶	𒗷	𒗸	𒗹	𒗺	𒗻	𒗼	𒗽	𒗾	𒗿
U+1260x	𒘀	𒘁	𒘂	𒘃	𒘄	𒘅	𒘆	𒘇	𒘈	𒘉	𒘊	𒘋	𒘌	𒘍	𒘎	𒘏
U+1261x	𒘐	𒘑	𒘒	𒘓	𒘔	𒘕	𒘖	𒘗	𒘘	𒘙	𒘚	𒘛	𒘜	𒘝	𒘞	𒘟
U+1262x	𒘠	𒘡	𒘢	𒘣	𒘤	𒘥	𒘦	𒘧	𒘨	𒘩	𒘪	𒘫	𒘬	𒘭	𒘮	𒘯
U+1263x	𒘰	𒘱	𒘲	𒘳	𒘴	𒘵	𒘶	𒘷	𒘸	𒘹	𒘺	𒘻	𒘼	𒘽	𒘾	𒘿
U+1264x	𒙀	𒙁	𒙂	𒙃	𒙄	𒙅	𒙆	𒙇	𒙈	𒙉	𒙊	𒙋	𒙌	𒙍	𒙎	𒙏
U+1265x	𒙐	𒙑	𒙒	𒙓	𒙔	𒙕	𒙖	𒙗	𒙘	𒙙	𒙚	𒙛	𒙜	𒙝	𒙞	𒙟
U+1266x	𒙠	𒙡	𒙢	𒙣	𒙤	𒙥	𒙦	𒙧	𒙨	𒙩	𒙪	𒙫	𒙬	𒙭	𒙮	𒙯
U+1267x	𒙰	𒙱	𒙲	𒙳	𒙴	𒙵	𒙶	𒙷	𒙸	𒙹	𒙺	𒙻	𒙼	𒙽	𒙾	𒙿
U+1268x	𒚀	𒚁	𒚂	𒚃	𒚄	𒚅	𒚆									
Notes 1.As of Unicode version 18.0 2.Grey areas indicate non-assigned code points

== Corpus ==
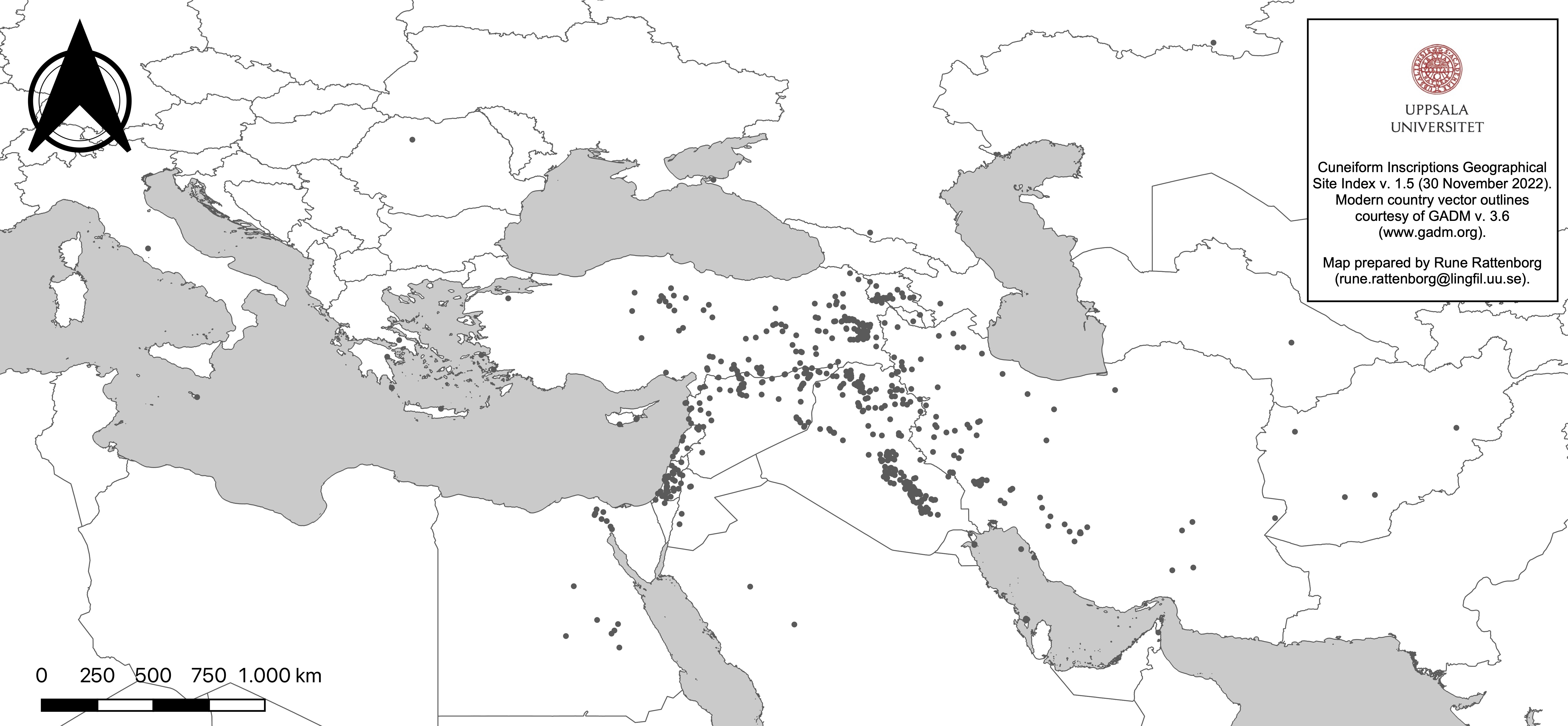
A map showing the locations of all known provenanced cuneiform inscriptions. Cuneiform Inscriptions Geographical Site Index v1.5, November 2022, from Uppsala University.

Numerous efforts have been made since the 19th century to create a corpus of known cuneiform inscriptions. In the 21st century, the Cuneiform Digital Library Initiative and Open Richly Annotated Cuneiform Corpus are two of the most significant projects.

List of major cuneiform tablet discoveries
Location	Number of tablets	Language
Nineveh	20,000–24,000	Akkadian
Nippur	60,000	
Girsu	40,000–50,000	
Dūr-Katlimmu	500	
Sippar	60,000–70,000	Babylonian
Amarna	382	Canaano-Akkadian
Nuzi	10,000–20,000	Akkadian, Hurro-Akkadian
Assur	16,000	Akkadian
Hattusa	30,000	Hittite, Hurrian
Drehem	100,000	Sumerian
Kanesh	23,000	Akkadian
Ugarit	1,500	Ugaritic, Hurrian
Persepolis	15,000–18,000	Elamite, Old Persian
Mari	20,000–25,000	Akkadian
Alalakh	300	Akkadian, Hurro-Akkadian
Abu Salabikh	500	Sumerian, Akkadian
Ebla	approx. 5,000	Sumerian, Eblaite
Nimrud	244	Neo-Assyrian, Neo-Babylonian

== See also ==
- Hieratic
- Elamite cuneiform
- Hittite cuneiform
- Journal of Cuneiform Studies
- List of cuneiform signs
- List of museums of ancient Near Eastern art
- Old Persian cuneiform
- Ugaritic alphabet
- Urartian cuneiform
- Babylonokia: a 21st-century cuneiform artwork

== Bibliography ==
- Bogacz, Bartosz; Mara, Hubert (June 30, 2022). "Digital Assyriology—Advances in Visual Cuneiform Analysis". Journal on Computing and Cultural Heritage. 15 (2): 1–22. doi:10.1145/3491239. S2CID 248843112.
- Burnouf, E. (1836). "Mémoire sur deux Inscriptions Cunéiformes trouvées près d'Hamadan et qui font partie des papiers du Dr Schulz", [Memoir on two cuneiform inscriptions [that were] found near Hamadan and that form part of the papers of Dr. Schulz], Imprimerie Royale, Paris.
- Cammarosano, M. (2017–2018) "Cuneiform Writing Techniques", cuneiform.neocities.org (with further bibliography)
- Michel, Cécile, "Identifying Missing Evidence in an Abundant Cuneiform Corpus", Missing Evidence in the Study of Ancient Cultures: Methodological Reflections and Case Studies on Fragmentary Sources, edited by Cécile Michel, Michael Friedrich and Jorrit Kelder, De Gruyter, pp. 119–146, 2026
- Charvát, Petr. "Cherchez la femme: The SAL Sign in Proto-Cuneiform Writing". La famille dans le Proche-Orient ancien: réalités, symbolismes et images: Proceedings of the 55e Rencontre Assyriologique Internationale, Paris, edited by Lionel Marti, University Park, USA: Penn State University Press, 2021, pp. 169–182
- Dahl, J. L., "The early development of the cuneiform writing system, and its regional adaptation", in National Museum of World Writing Academic Series, National Museum of World Writing, pp. 285–318, 2025
- Borger, Rykle (2004). Dietrich, Manfried [in German]; Loretz, Oswald [in German] (eds.). Mesopotamisches Zeichenlexikon [Mesopotamian Signs' List]. Alter Orient und Altes Testament (in German). Vol. 305. Münster: Ugarit Verlag. ISBN 978-3-927120-82-2.
- F. Ellermeier, M. Studt, Sumerisches Glossar
  - vol. 1: 1979–1980, ISBN 978-3-921747-08-7, ISBN 978-3-921747-10-0
  - vol. 3.2: 1998–2005, A-B ISBN 978-3-921747-24-7, D-E ISBN 978-3-921747-25-4, G ISBN 978-3-921747-29-2
  - vol. 3.3: ISBN 978-3-921747-22-3 (font CD ISBN 978-3-921747-23-0)
  - vol. 3.5: ISBN 978-3-921747-26-1
  - vol 3.6: 2003, Handbuch Assur ISBN 978-3-921747-28-5
- Robert K. Englund and Rainer M.Boehmer, "Archaic Administrative Texts from Uruk – The Early Campaigns", (ATU Bd. 5), Berlin: Gebr. Mann Verlag 1994 ISBN 978-3786117452
- Robert K. Englund, Roger J. Matthews, "Proto-Cuneiform Texts from Diverse Collections", Berlin: Gebr. Mann 1996 ISBN 978-3786118756
- Finkel, Irving; Taylor, Jonathan (2015). Cuneiform. Londres: The British Museum Press..
- Jean-Jacques Glassner, The Invention of Cuneiform, English translation, Johns Hopkins University Press (2003), ISBN 978-0-8018-7389-8.
- Hayes, John L. (2000). A Manual of Sumerian Grammar and Texts. Aids and Research Tools in Ancient Near Eastern Studies. Vol. 5 (2d ed.). Malibu: Undena Publications. ISBN 978-0-89003-197-1.
- Heeren (1815) "Ideen über die Politik, den Verkehr und den Handel der vornehmsten Volker der alten Welt", vol. i. pp. 563 seq., translated into English in 1833
- DSpace Hershkovitz, Yehonatan, "The Adaptation Process of Cuneiform in the Old Babylonian Period", Dissertation, Harvard University, 2023
- Kramer, Samuel Noah (1981). "Appendix B: The Origin of the Cuneiform Writing System". History Begins at Sumer: Thirty-Nine Firsts in Man's Recorded History (3d revised ed.). Philadelphia: University of Pennsylvania Press. pp. 381–383. ISBN 978-0-8122-7812-5.
- René Labat, Manuel d'epigraphie Akkadienne, Geuthner, Paris (1959); 6th ed., extended by Florence Malbran-Labat (1999), ISBN 978-2-7053-3583-0
- Lassen, Christian (1836) Die Altpersischen Keil-Inschriften von Persepolis. Entzifferung des Alphabets und Erklärung des Inhalts. [The Old-Persian cuneiform inscriptions of Persepolis. Decipherment of the alphabet and explanation of its content.] Eduard Weber, Bonn, (Germany)
- Lewenstein, Or, et al, "A Large-Scale Dataset of Annotated Cuneiform Sign Images for Digital Palaeography", Journal of Open Humanities Data 12.1, 2026
- O. Neugebauer, A. Sachs (eds.), Mathematical Cuneiform Texts, New Haven (1945)
- Ouyang, Xiaoli, and Christine Proust, "Place-Value Notations in the Ur III Period: Marginal Numbers in Administrative Texts", Cultures of Computation and Quantification in the Ancient World: Numbers, Measurements, and Operations in Documents from Mesopotamia, China and South Asia. Cham: Springer International Publishing, pp. 267–356, 2023
- Patri, Sylvain, "La perception des consonnes hittites dans les langues étrangères au XIIIe siècle." Zeitschrift für Assyriologie und vorderasiatische Archäologie, 99(1): 87–126, 2009 doi:10.1515/ZA.2009.003.
- Prichard, James Cowles (1844). "Researches Into the Physical History of Mankind", 3rd ed., vol IV, Sherwood, Gilbert and Piper, London
- Philippe Quenet, "The Diffusion of the Cuneiform Writing System in Northern Mesopotamia: The Earliest Archaeological Evidence", Iraq, vol. 67, no. 2, pp. 31–40, 2005
- Rattenborg, Rune, Smidt, Gustav Ryberg, Johansson, Carolin, Melin-Kronsell, Nils and Nett, Seraina, "The Archaeological Distribution of the Cuneiform Corpus: A Provisional Quantitative and Geospatial Survey", Altorientalische Forschungen, vol. 50, no. 2, pp. 178–205, 2003
- Rawlinson, Henry (1847) "The Persian Cuneiform Inscription at Behistun, decyphered and translated; with a Memoir on Persian Cuneiform Inscriptions in general, and on that of Behistun in Particular", The Journal of the Royal Asiatic Society of Great Britain and Ireland, vol. X. JSTOR 25581217
- Smidt, Gustav Ryberg, Carolin Johansson, Nils Melin-Kronsell, Seraina Nett, and Rune Rattenborg, "CIGS-AE: A Quantitative Index of Cuneiform Inscriptions", Cuneiform Digital Library Notes 2024 (2), 2024
- Ronald Herbert Sack, Cuneiform Documents from the Chaldean and Persian Periods, (1994) ISBN 978-0-945636-67-0
- Nikolaus Schneider, Die Keilschriftzeichen der Wirtschaftsurkunden von Ur III nebst ihren charakteristischsten Schreibvarianten, Keilschrift-Paläographie; Heft 2, Rom: Päpstliches Bibelinstitut (1935)
- Wolfgang Schramm, Akkadische Logogramme, Goettinger Arbeitshefte zur Altorientalischen Literatur (GAAL) Heft 4, Goettingen (2003), ISBN 978-3-936297-01-0
- F. Thureau-Dangin, Recherches sur l'origine de l'écriture cunéiforme, Paris (1898)
- Veldhuis, Niek (2012). "Cuneiform: Changes and Developments". In Stephen D. Houston (ed.). The Shape of Script: How and Why Writing Systems Change. Santa-Fe: School of Advanced Research Press. pp. 3–23.
- Wang, Zhaohui Geoffrey, "TabletCraft: Bridging a 4,000-Year Cultural Gap with Bidirectional Akkadian NMT and Cuneiform Rendering", Proceedings of the 4th Workshop on Cross-Cultural Considerations in NLP (C3NLP 2026), pp. 132-136, 2026
- Woods, Christopher (2020). "The Emergence of Cuneiform Writing". In R. Hasselbach-Andee (ed.). A Companion to Ancient Near Eastern languages. Hoboken: Wiley-Blackwell. pp. 27–46.
