= Achaemenid conquest of the Indus Valley =

Ancient Persian conquest in the Indian subcontinent

- Map of ancient India, c. 500 BCE, with the Persian frontier delineated along the Indus River and the Jhelum River
Date	c. 535/518 BCE – 323 BCE
Location	Indus Valley
Result	Persian victory
Territorial changes	Annexation of the Indus Valley by the Persians

Belligerents
Achaemenid Empire	Gandhara; Sindhu-Sauvīra; Kambojas

Commanders and leaders
Cyrus the Great; Darius the Great	Pushkarasarin

Strength
Unknown	Unknown

Casualties and losses
Unknown	Unknown

Around 535 BCE, the Persian king Cyrus the Great initiated a protracted campaign to absorb parts of northwestern South Asia into his nascent Achaemenid Empire. In this initial incursion, the Persian army annexed a large region to the west of the Indus River, consolidating the early eastern borders of their new realm. With a brief pause after Cyrus' death around 530 BCE, the campaign continued under Darius the Great, who began to re-conquer former provinces and further expand the Achaemenid Empire's political boundaries. Around 518 BCE, the Persian army pushed further into the Indus to initiate a second period of conquest by annexing regions up to the Jhelum River in present-day West Punjab. At their peak, the Achaemenids incorporated and ruled much of modern-day Pakistan into their territory.

The first secure epigraphic evidence through the Behistun Inscription gives a date before or around 518 BCE. Persian penetration into the Indian subcontinent occurred in multiple stages, beginning from the northern parts of the Indus River and moving southward. As mentioned in several Achaemenid-era inscriptions, the Indus Valley was formally incorporated into the Persian realm through provincial divisions: Gandāra, Hindush, and Sattagydia.

Persian rule over the Indus Valley waned over succeeding centuries and formally ended with the Greek conquest of Persia, led by Alexander the Great, giving rise to independent kingdoms such as those of Abisares, Porus, and Taxiles, as well as a number of gaṇasaṅghas, which would later confront the Macedonian army as it massed into the region for Alexander's Indian campaign. The Achaemenid Empire set a precedence of governance through the use of satrapies, which was further implemented by the Macedonian Empire, the Indo-Scythians, and the Kushan Empire.

It was also during Achaemenid rule, roughly around 850-600 BCE that the terms "Hindu" (derived from Sindhu) and "Hind" (derived from Sindh) began to appear in speech and writing. The terms are widely used till this day.

== Achaemenid conquest ==
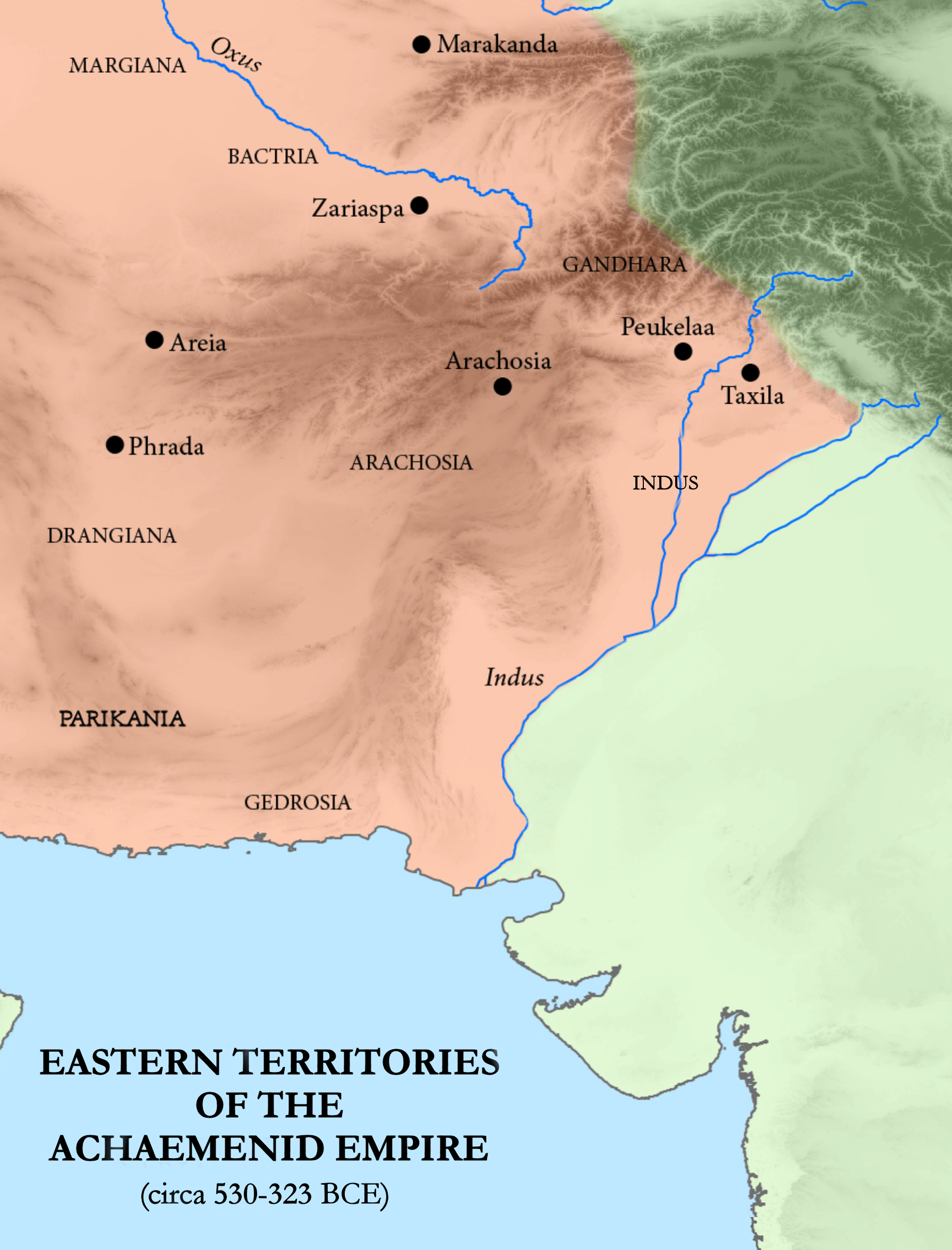
Eastern territories of the Achaemenid Empire

For millennia, the northwestern part of Indian subcontinent had maintained some level of trade relations with the Near East. Finally, the Achaemenid Empire underwent a considerable expansion, both to the east and west, during the reign of Cyrus the Great (c. 600–530 BC), leading the dynasty to take a direct interest into the region of the northwestern subcontinent.

=== Cyrus the Great ===
The conquest is often thought to have begun circa 535 BCE, during the time of Cyrus the Great (600–530 BCE). Cyrus probably went as far as the banks of the Indus River and organized the conquered territories under the satrapy of Gandāra (Old Persian cuneiform: 𐎥𐎭𐎠𐎼, Gadāra, also transliterated as Ga^{n}dāra since the nasal "n" before consonants was omitted in the Old Persian script, and simplified as Gandara) as inferred from the Behistun inscription. The province was also referred to as Paruparaesanna (Greek: Parapamisadae) in the Babylonian and Elamite versions of the Behistun inscription. The geographical extent of this province was wider than the Indian Gandhara. Various accounts, such as those of Xenophon or Ctesias, who wrote Indica, also suggest that Cyrus conquered parts of India. Another Indian province was also conquered, named Sattagydia (𐎰𐎫𐎦𐎢𐏁, Thataguš) in the Behistun inscription. It was probably contiguous to Gandāra, but its actual location is uncertain. Fleming locates it between Arachosia and the middle Indus. Fleming also mentions Maka, in the area of Gedrosia, as one of the Indian satrapies.

=== Darius I ===
A successor of Cyrus the Great, Darius I was back in 518 BCE. The date of 518 BCE is given by the Behistun inscription, and is also often the one given for the secure occupation of Gandāra in West Punjab. Darius I later conquered an additional province that he calls Hindush in his inscriptions (Old Persian cuneiform: 𐏃𐎡𐎯𐎢𐏁, H-i-du-u-š, also transliterated as Hi^{n}dūš since the nasal "n" before consonants was omitted in the Old Persian script, and simplified as Hindush), corresponding to the Indus Valley. The Hamadan Gold and Silver Tablet inscription of Darius I also refers to his conquests in India.

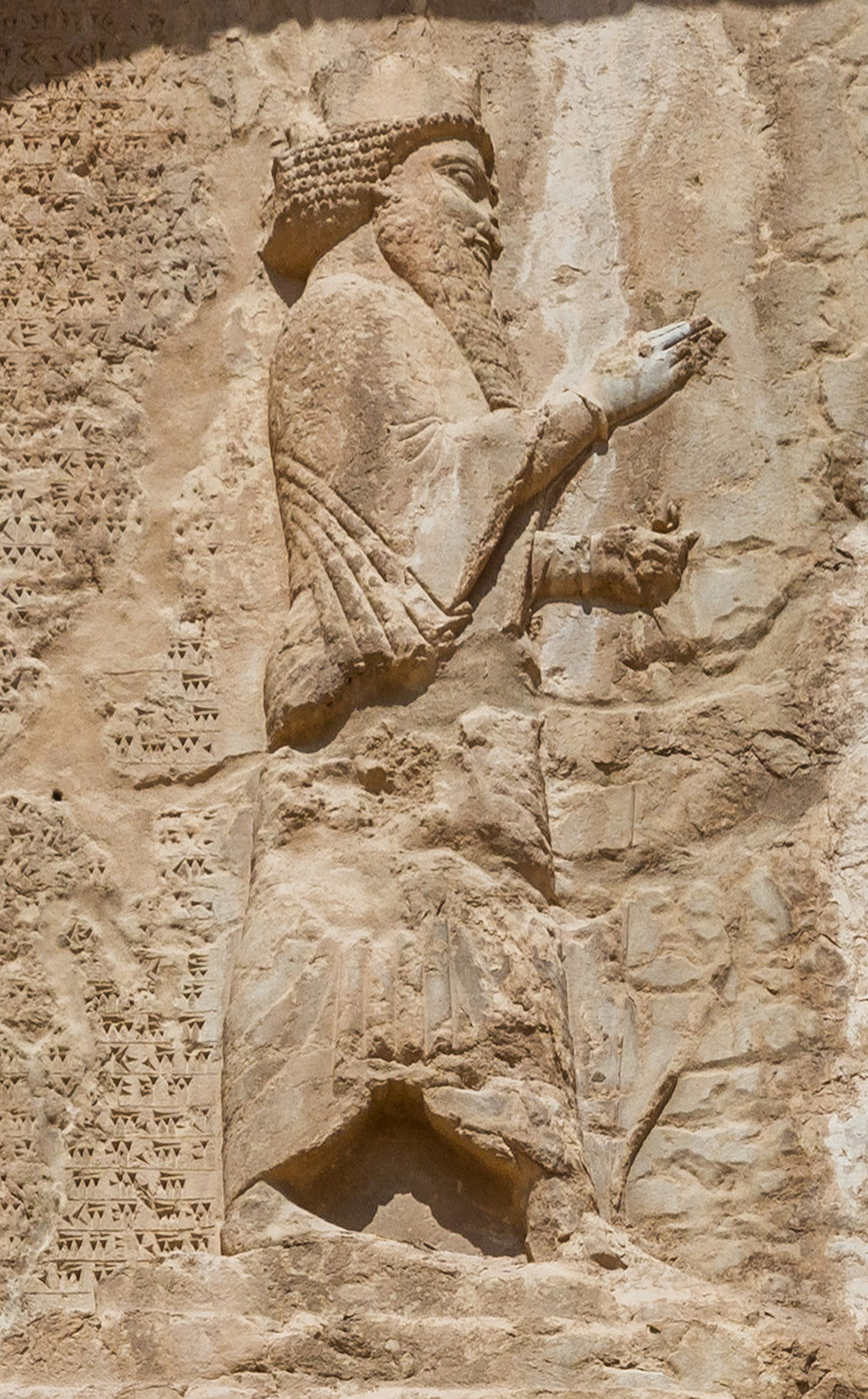
Darius I on his tomb

The exact area of the province of Hindush is uncertain. Some scholars have described it as the middle and lower Indus Valley and the approximate region of modern Sindh, but there is no known evidence of Achaemenid presence in this region, and deposits of gold, which Herodotus says was produced in vast quantities by this Province, are also unknown in the Indus delta region. Alternatively, Hindush may have been the region of Taxila in Western Punjab, where there are indications that a Persian satrapy may have existed. There are few remains of Achaemenid presence in the east, but, according to Fleming, the archaeological site of Bhir Mound in Taxila remains the "most plausible candidate for the capital of Achaemenid India", based on the fact that numerous pottery styles similar to those of the Achaemenids in the East have been found there, and that "there are no other sites in the region with Bhir Mound's potential".

According to Herodotus, Darius I sent the Greek explorer Scylax of Caryanda to sail down the Indus River, heading a team of spies, in order to explore the course of the Indus River. After a periplus of 30 months, Scylax is said to have returned to Egypt near the Red Sea, and the seas between the Near East and India were made use of by Darius.

Herodotus names the territories of Gandāra, Sattagydia, Dadicae and Aparytae as the 7th province of the Achaemenid Empire for tax-payment purposes, while Indus (called Ἰνδός, "Indos" in Greek sources) formed the 20th tax region.

=== Achaemenid army during the invasion ===
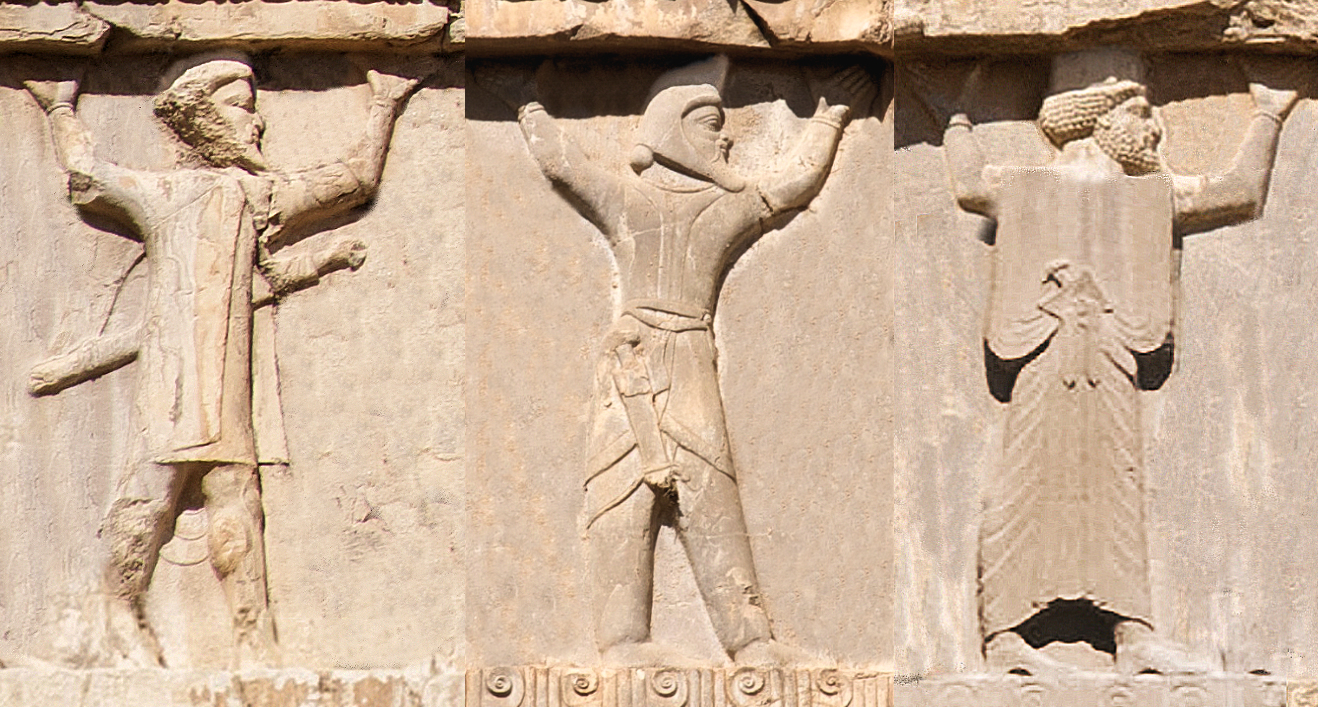
Greek Ionian (Yavanas), Scythian (Sakas) and Persian (Parasikas) soldiers of the Achaemenid army, as described on Achaemenid royal tombs from c. 500 to 338 BCE

Throughout its existence, the Achaemenids were constantly engaging in wars, either through conquering new territories or by quelling rebellions throughout the empire. To fulfil this need, the Achaemenid Empire had to maintain a professional standing army which levied and employed personnel from all of its satraps and territories.

The Achaemenid army was not uniquely Persian. Rather it was composed of many different ethnicities that were part of the vast and diverse empire. Herodotus gives a full list of the ethnicities of the Achaemenid army, in which are included Bactrians, Sakas (Scythians), Parthians, Sogdians, Ionians (Greeks), Egyptians, Ethiopians, etc. These ethnicities are likely to have been included in the Achaemenid army during the invasions of India.

== Achaemenid royal inscriptions ==
Indian satrapies
on the Egyptian statue of Darius I

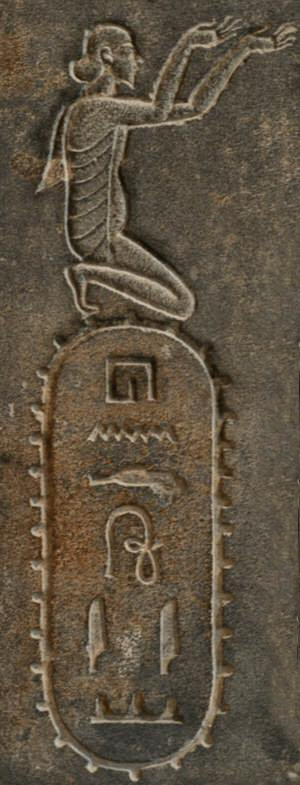
𓉔𓈖𓂧𓍯𓇌
h-n-d-wꜣ-y
Hindush ("India")

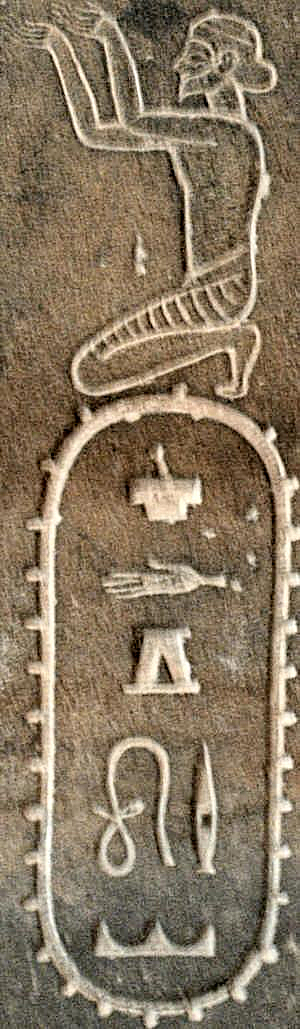
𓐠𓂧𓎼𓍯𓍒
sꜣ-d-g-wꜣ-ḏꜣ
Sattagydia

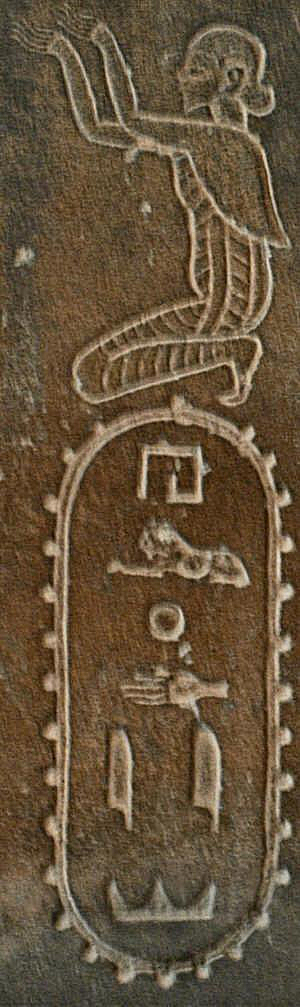
𓉔𓃭𓐍𓂧𓇌
h-rw-ḫ-d-y
Gandara

These events were recorded in the Achaemenid royal inscriptions such as the Behistun inscription and the Naqsh-e Rostam inscription, as well as the accounts of Herodotus (483–431 BCE). The Greek Scylax of Caryanda, who had been appointed by Darius I to explore the Indian Ocean from the mouth of the Indus to Suez left an account, the Periplous, of which fragments from secondary sources have survived. Hecataeus of Miletus (circa 500 BCE) also wrote about the "Indus Satrapies" of the Achaemenids.

=== Behistun inscription ===
The 'DB' Behistun inscription of Darius I (circa 510 BCE) mentions Gandāra (𐎥𐎭𐎠𐎼, Gadāra) and the adjacent territory of Sattagydia (𐎰𐎫𐎦𐎢𐏁, Thataguš) as part of the Achaemenid Empire:

King Darius says: These are the countries which are subject unto me, and by the grace of Ahuramazda I became king of them: Persia [Pârsa], Elam [Ûvja], Babylonia [Bâbiruš], Assyria [Athurâ], Arabia [Arabâya], Egypt [Mudrâya], the countries by the Sea, Lydia [Sparda], the Greeks [Yauna (Ionia)], Media [Mâda], Armenia [Armina], Cappadocia [Katpatuka], Parthia [Parthava], Drangiana [Zraka], Aria [Haraiva], Chorasmia [Uvârazmîy], Bactria [Bâxtriš], Sogdia [Suguda], Gandāra [Gadāra], Scythia [Saka], Sattagydia [Thataguš], Arachosia [Harauvatiš] and Maka [Maka]; twenty-three lands in all.

— Behistun Inscription of Darius I.

From the dating of the Behistun inscription, it is possible to infer that the Achaemenids first conquered the areas of Gandāra and Sattagydia circa 518 BCE.

=== Statue of Darius inscriptions ===
Hinduš is also mentioned as one of 24 subject countries of the Achaemenid Empire, illustrated with the drawing of a kneeling subject and a hieroglyphic cartridge reading 𓉔𓈖𓂧𓍯𓇌 (h-n-d-wꜣ-y), on the Egyptian statue of Darius I, now in the National Museum of Iran. Sattagydia also appears (𓐠𓂧𓎼𓍯𓍒, sꜣ-d-g-wꜣ-ḏꜣ, Sattagydia), and probably Gandāra (𓉔𓃭𓐍𓂧𓇌, h-rw-ḫ-d-y, although this could be Arachosia), with their own illustrations.

=== Apadana Palace foundation tablets ===
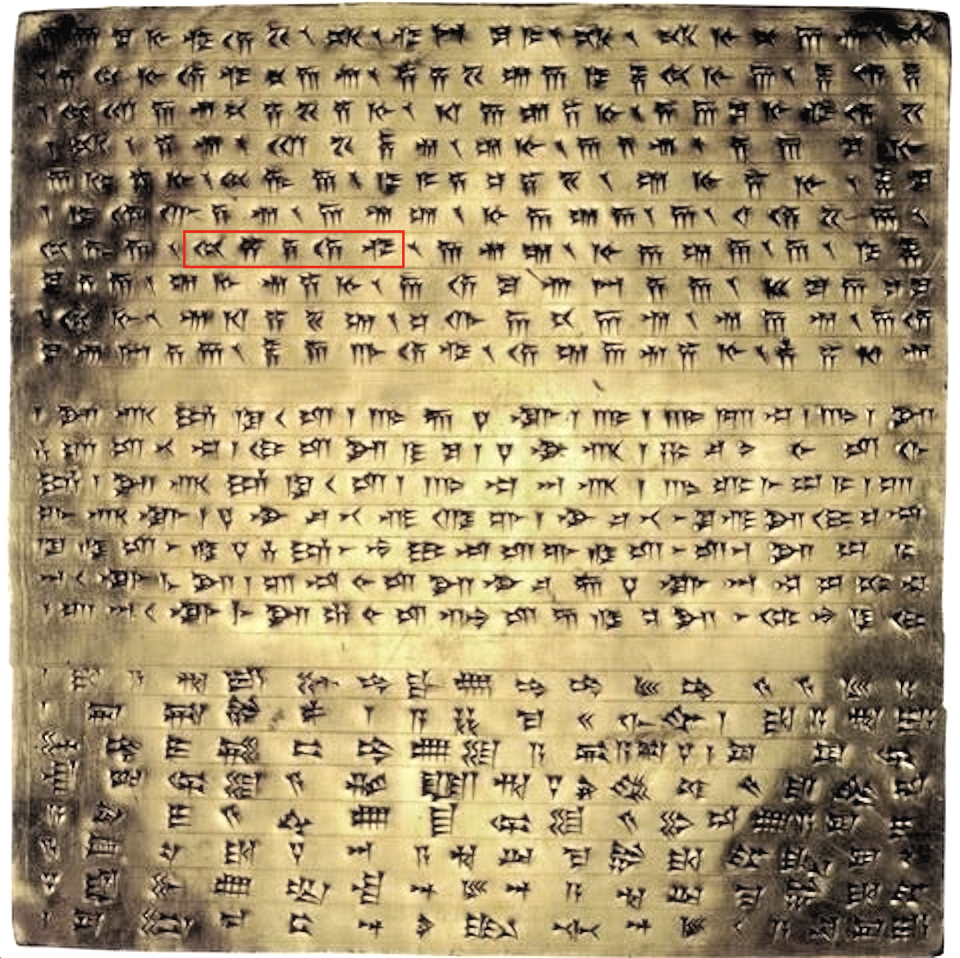
Gold foundation plate of Darius I in the Apadana Palace in Persepolis with the word Hidauv, locative of "Hiduš"

Four identical foundation tablets of gold and silver, found in two deposition boxes in the foundations of the Apadana Palace, also contained an inscription by Darius I in Old Persian cuneiform, which describes the extent of his empire in broad geographical terms, from the Indus Valley in the east to Lydia in the west, and from the Scythians beyond Sogdia in the north, to the African Kingdom of Kush in the south. This is known as the DPh inscription. The deposition of these foundation tablets and the Apadana coin hoard found under them, is dated to circa 515 BCE.

Darius the great king, king of kings, king of countries, son of Hystaspes, an Achaemenid. King Darius says: This is the kingdom which I hold, from the Sacae who are beyond Sogdia to Kush, and from Sind (Old Persian: 𐏃𐎡𐎭𐎢𐎺, "Hidauv", locative of "Hiduš", i.e. "Indus valley") to Lydia (Old Persian: "Spardâ") - [this is] what Ahuramazda, the greatest of gods, bestowed upon me. May Ahuramazda protect me and my royal house!

— DPh inscription of Darius I in the foundations of the Apadana Palace

=== Naqsh-e Rustam inscription ===
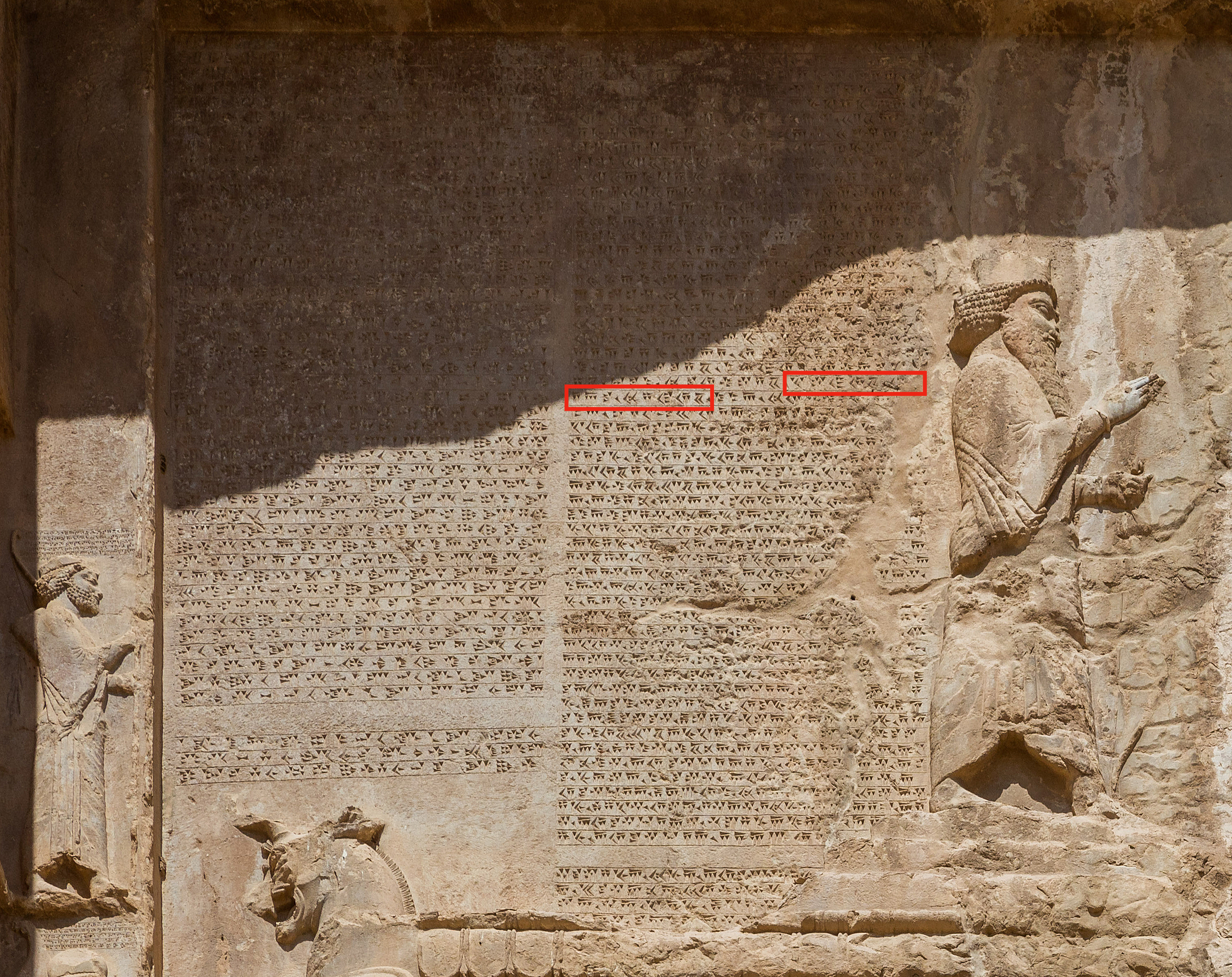
The Naqsh-e Rustam DNa inscription, on the tomb of Darius I, mentioning all three Indian territories: Sattagydia (𐎰𐎫𐎦𐎢𐏁, Thataguš), Gandara (𐎥𐎭𐎠𐎼, Gadāra) and Hindush (𐏃𐎡𐎯𐎢𐏁, Hidūš) as part of the Achaemenid Empire.

The DSe inscription and DSm inscription of Darius in Susa gives Thataguš (Sattagydia), Gadāra (Gandāra) and Hiduš (Hindush) among the nations that he rules.

Hidūš (𐏃𐎡𐎯𐎢𐏁 in Old Persian cuneiform) also appears later as a satrapy in the Naqsh-i-Rustam inscription at the end of the reign of Darius, who died in 486 BCE. The DNa inscription on Darius' tomb at Naqsh-i-Rustam near Persepolis records Gadāra (Gandāra) along with Hiduš and Thataguš (Sattagydia) in the list of satrapies.

King Darius says: By the favor of Ahuramazda these are the countries which I seized outside of Persia; I ruled over them; they bore tribute to me; they did what was said to them by me; they held my law firmly; Media, Elam, Parthia, Aria, Bactria, Sogdia, Chorasmia, Drangiana, Arachosia, Sattagydia, Gandara (Gadāra), India (Hiduš), the haoma-drinking Scythians, the Scythians with pointed caps, Babylonia, Assyria, Arabia, Egypt, Armenia, Cappadocia, Lydia, the Greeks (Yauna), the Scythians across the sea (Sakâ), Thrace, the petasos-wearing Greeks [Yaunâ], the Libyans, the Nubians, the men of Maka and the Carians.

— Naqsh-e Rustam inscription of Darius I (circa 490 BCE)

== Achaemenid administration ==
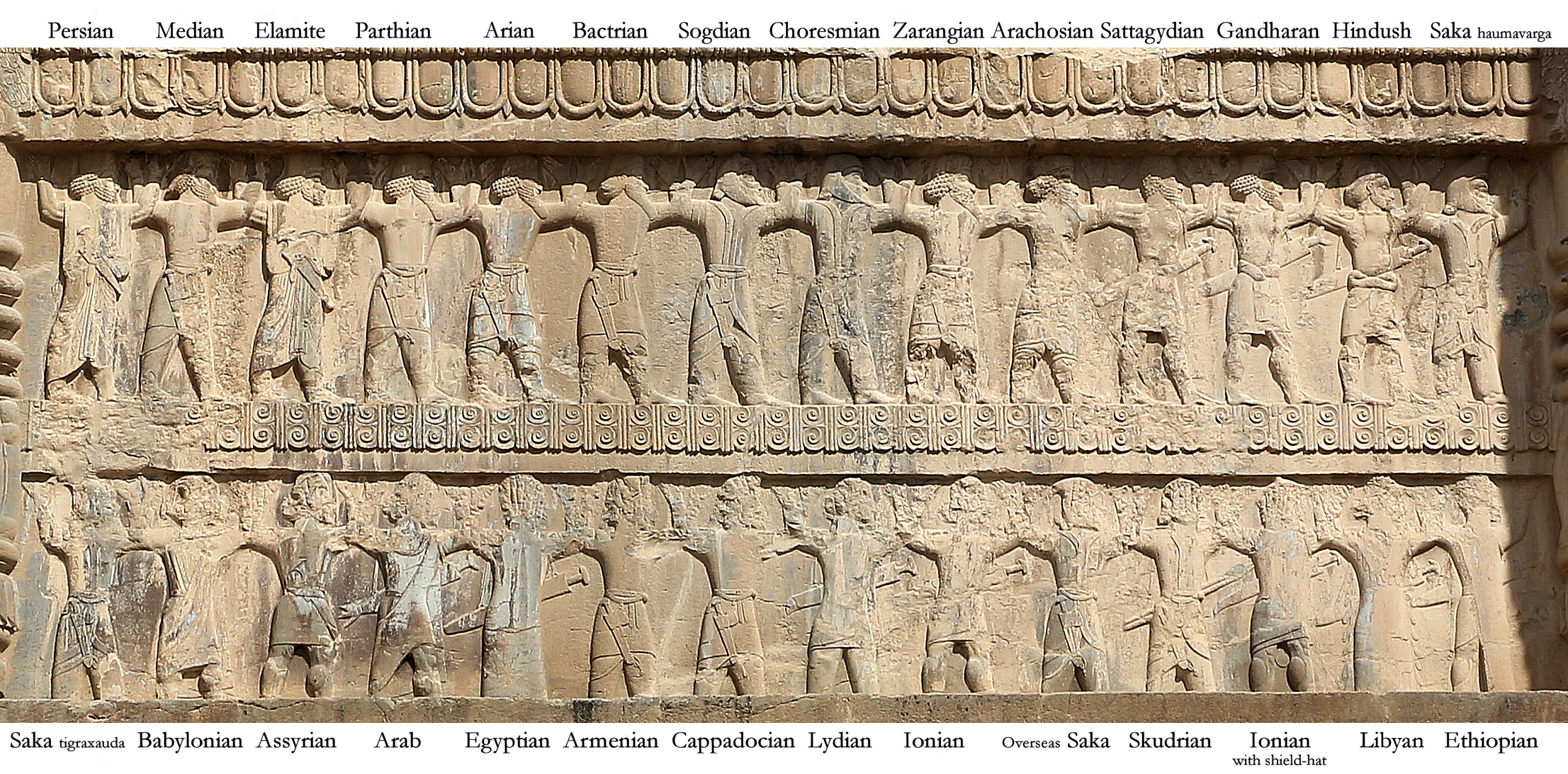
The three types of soldiers (Hinduš, Gandāra and Sattagydia) still appear (upper right corner) among the soldiers of the Achaemenid Empire on the tomb of Artaxerxes III (who died in 338 BCE).

The nature of the administration under the Achaemenids is uncertain. Even though the Indian provinces are called "satrapies" by convention, there is no evidence of there being any satraps in these provinces. When Alexander invaded the region, he did not encounter Achaemenid satraps in the Indian provinces, but local Indian rulers referred to as hyparchs ("Vice-Regents"), a term that connotes subordination to the Achaemenid rulers. The local rulers may have reported to the satraps of Bactria and Arachosia.

=== Achaemenid lists of provinces ===
Darius I listed three Indian provinces: Sattagydia (Thataguš), Gandāra (Gandhara) and Hindush (Hidūš), in which Hidūš should be understood as Indus Valley, in the Naqsh-e Rustam inscription.

Gandāra included the entire Peshawar Valley which was bound by the Swat Valley in the north, Bactria in the west, the Indus River to the south-east, and Sattagydia in the south. The capital of the Gandāra satrapy was Puṣkalāvatī. Archeological excavations of Puṣkalāvatī were conducted by Mortimer Wheeler in 1962 who discovered structures built during the Achaemenid period as well as artifacts.

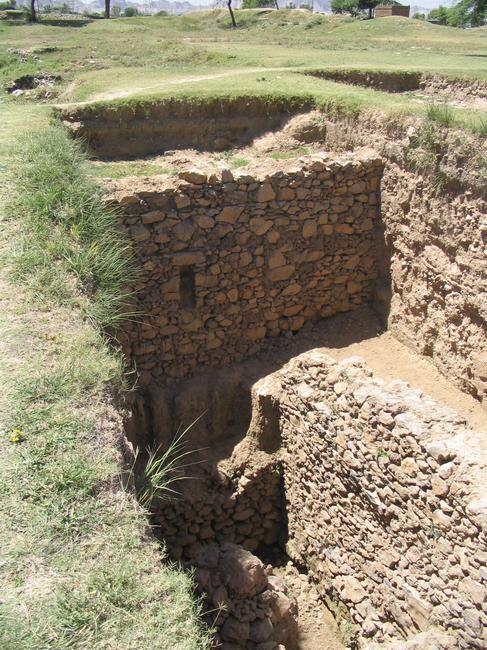
Ruins at Bhir Mound at the city of Taxila, which is considered "most plausible candidate" of the Achaemenid capital in the Indus Valley

The Achaemenid satrapy of Hindush incorporated the greater Punjab region in the Indus Valley. It was bound by the Hazara region to the north, the Indus River to the west, and the Jhelum River in the south and east. The capital was probably Bhir Mound in Taxila. Bhir Mound was excavated by John Marshall between 1913 and 1934. Fortified structures and canals were found dating to the Achaemenid period, as well as ornamental jewelry.

The three regions remained represented among Achaemenid provinces on all the tombs of the Achaemenid rulers after Darius, except for the last ruler Darius III who was vanquished by Alexander at Gaugamela, suggesting that these territories were under Achaemenids at least until 338 BCE, date of the end of the reign of Artaxerxes III, before the accession of Darius III, that is, less than 10 years before the campaigns of Alexander in the East and his victory at Gaugamela. The last known appearance of Gandāra in name as an Achaemenid province is on the list of the tomb of Artaxerxes II, circa 358 BCE, date of his burial. The presence of the three ethnicities on all the tombs of the Achaemenid rulers after Darius, except for the last ruler Darius III suggests that the Indians were under Achaemenid dominion at least until 338 BCE, the date of the end of the reign of Artaxerxes III.

=== List of Herodotus ===
Herodotus (III-91 and III-94), gives a list with a slightly different structure, as some province which are presented separately in the Achaemenid inscriptions are grouped together by Herodotus when he described the tribute paid by each territory. Herodotus presents Indos (Ἰνδός) as "the 20th province", while "the Sattagydae, Gandarii, Dadicae, and Aparytae" together form "the 7th Province". According to historian A. T. Olmstead, the fact that some Achaemenid regions are grouped together in this list may have represented some loss of territory.

The Hindūš province remained loyal till Alexander's invasion. Circa 400 BC, Ctesias of Cnidus related that the Persian king was receiving numerous gifts from the kings of "India" (Hindūš). (Note: Ctesias: "The Indians also include this substance among their most precious gifts for the Persian king who receives it as a prize revered above all others.") Ctesias also reported Indian elephants and Indian mahouts making demonstrations of the elephant's strength at the Achaemenid court.

By about 380 BC, the Persian hold on the region was weakening, but the area continued to be a part of the Achaemenid Empire until Alexander's invasion.

Darius III (c. 380 – July 330 BC) still had Indian units in his army, albeit very few in comparison to his predecessors. In particular he had 15 war elephants at the Battle of Gaugamela for his fight against Alexander the Great.

=== List of Strabo ===
The extent of Achaemenid territories is also affirmed by Strabo in his Geography (Book XV), describing the Persian holdings along the Indus:

The geographical position of the tribes is as follows: along the Indus are the Paropamisadae, above whom lies the Paropamisus mountain: then, towards the south, the Arachoti: then next, towards the south, the Gedroseni, with the other tribes that occupy the seaboard; and the Indus lies, latitudinally, alongside all these places; and of these places, in part, some that lie along the Indus are held by Indians, although they formerly belonged to the Persians.

— The Geography of Strabo, Book XV, Chapter 2, 9.

== Achaemenid tributes ==
=== Apadana Palace ===
Tribute bearers from Hinduš: Carrying small loads of probably gold dust and leading an onager, on the East Staircase of Apadana Palace, c. 500 BCE

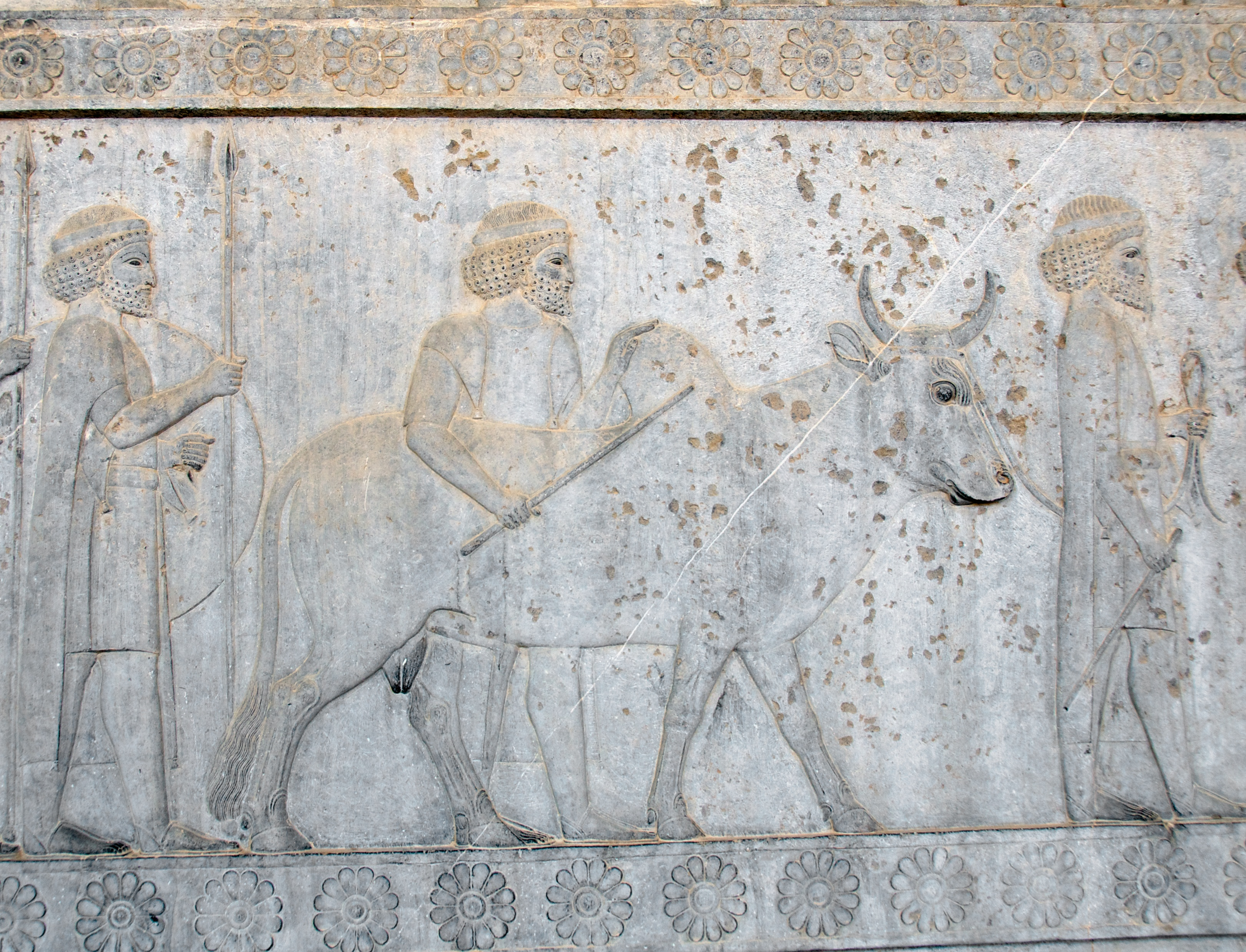
Tribute bearers from Gandāra: Carrying lances and leading a zebu, on the East Staircase of Apadana Palace, c. 500 BCE

The reliefs at the Apadana Palace in Persepolis describe tribute bearers from 23 satrapies visiting the Achaemenid court. These are two sets of reliefs located at the eastern and the northern end of the Apadana Staircase. Among the foreigners the Arabs, the Thracians, the Bactrians, the Indians (from the Indus Valley), the Parthians, the Cappadocians, the Elamites or the Medians. The Indians from the Indus Valley are bare-chested, except for their leader, and barefooted and wear the dhoti. They bring baskets with vases inside, carry axes, and drive along a donkey. One man in the Indian procession carries a small but visibly heavy load of four jars on a yoke, suggesting that he was carrying some of the gold dust paid by the Indians as tribute to the Achaemenid court.

=== Tribute payments ===
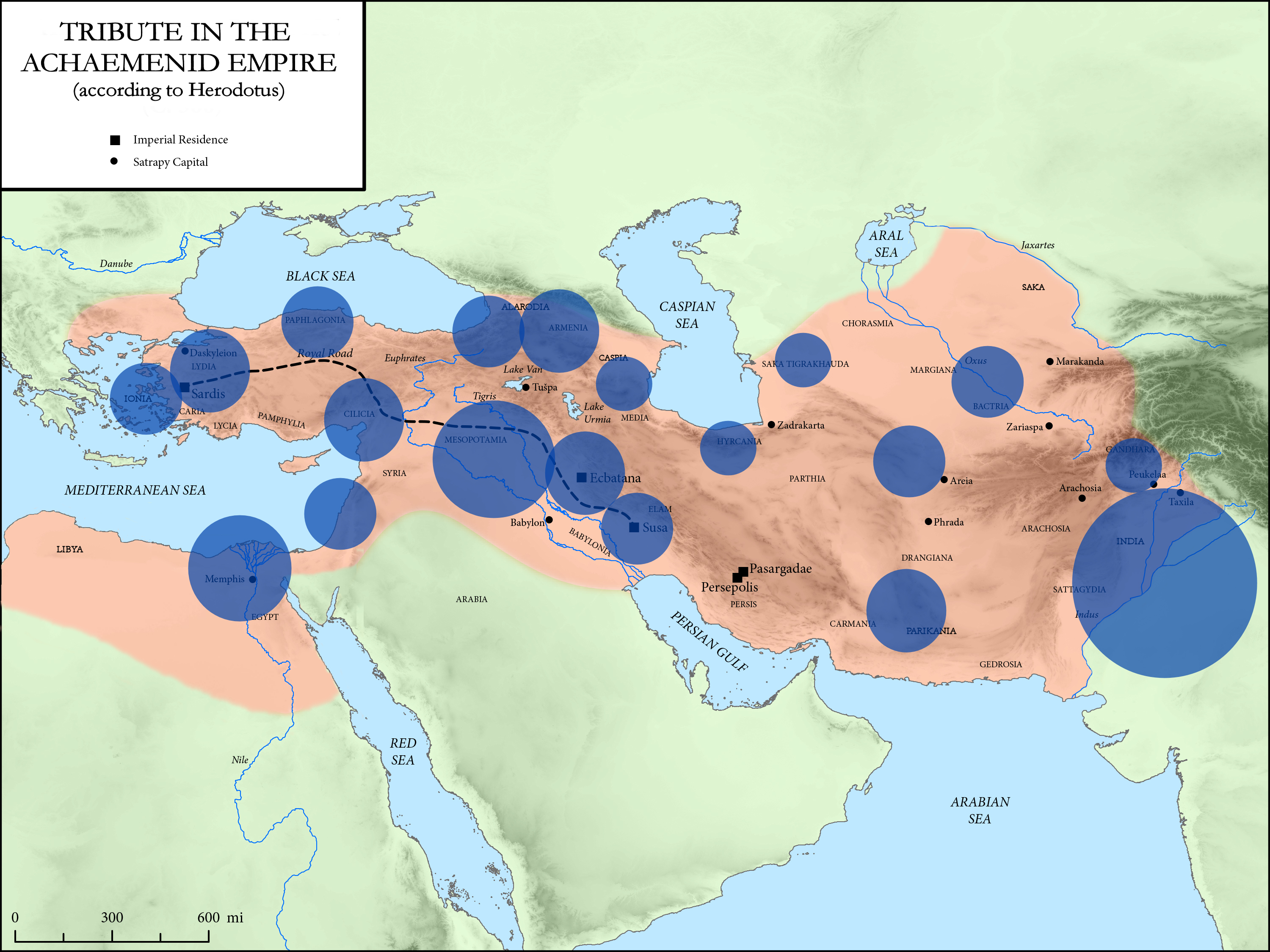
Volume of annual tribute per district, in the Achaemenid Empire, according to Herodotus

The conquered area was the most fertile and populous region of the Achaemenid Empire. An amount of tribute was fixed according to the richness of each territory. India was already fabled for its gold.

Herodotus (who makes several comments on India) published a list of tribute-paying nations, classifying them in 20 Provinces. The province of Indos (Ἰνδός, the Indus Valley) formed the 20th province, and was the richest and most populous of the Achaemenid provinces.

The Indians ( Ἰνδῶν) made up the twentieth province. These are more in number than any nation known to me, and they paid a greater tribute than any other province, namely three hundred and sixty talents of gold dust.

— Herodotus, III 94.

According to Herodotus, the "Indians" ('Ινδοι, Indoi)), as separate from the Gandarei and the Sattagydians, formed the 20th taxation Province, and were required to supply gold dust in tribute to the Achaemenid central government for an amount of 360 Euboean talents (equivalent to about 8300 kg or 8.3 tons of gold annually, a volume of gold that would fit in a cube of side 75 cm). The exchange rate between gold and silver at the time of Herodotus being 13 to 1, this was equal in value to the very large amount of 4680 Euboean talents of silver, equivalent to 3600 Babylonian talents of silver (equivalent in value to about 108 tons of silver annually). The country of the "Indians" ('Ινδοι, Indoi) was the Achaemenid district paying the largest tribute, and alone represented 32% of the total tribute revenues of the whole empire. It also means that Indos was the richest Achaemenid region in the subcontinent, much richer than Gandāra or Sattagydia. However the amount of gold in question is quite enormous, so there is a possibility that Herodotus was mistaken and that his own sources actually only meant something like the gold equivalent of 360 Babylonian talents of silver.

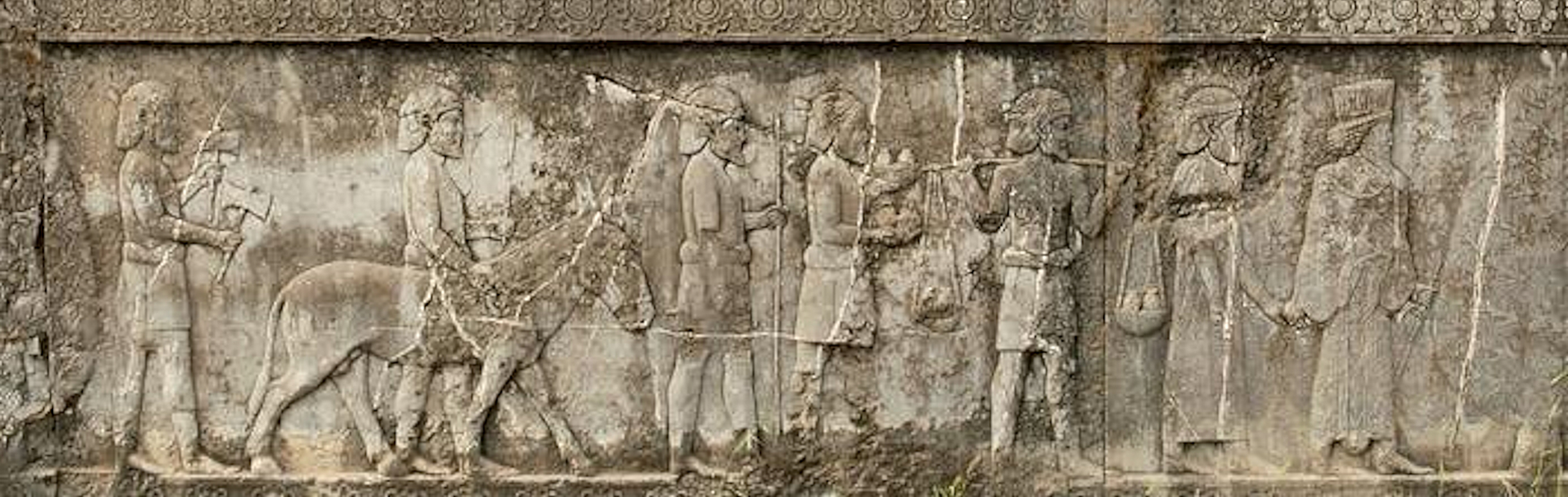
Hindush delegation carrying loads of probably gold and axes, with an onager, at Apadana Palace, North Staircase, 4th century BCE

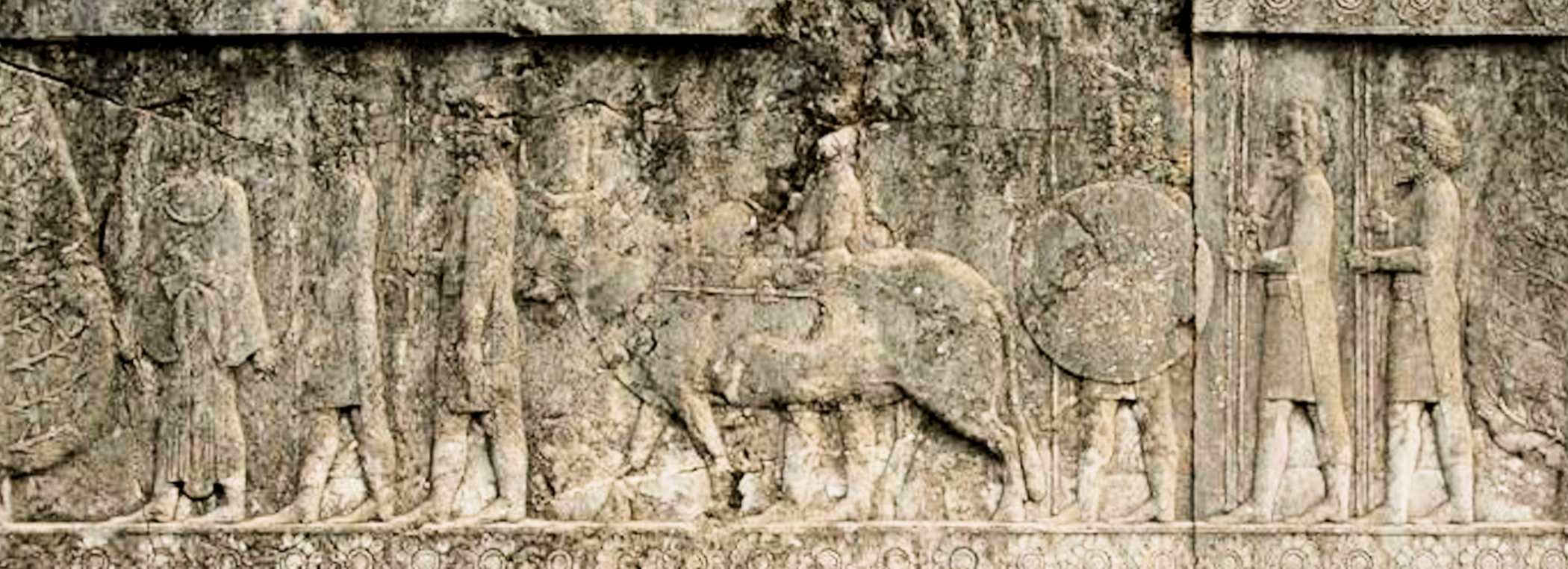
Gandaran delegation carrying lances and a shield, with a zebu, at Apadana Palace, North Staircase, 4th century BCE

The territories of Gandāra, Sattagydia, Dadicae (north-west of the Kashmir Valley) and the Aparytae are named separately, and were aggregated together for taxation purposes, forming the 7th Achaemenid province, and paying overall a much lower tribute of 170 talents together (about 5151 kg, or 5.1 tons of silver), hence only about 1.5% of the total revenues of the Achaemenid Empire:

The Sattagydae (Σατταγύδαι), Gandarii (Γανδάριοι), Dadicae, and Aparytae (Ἀπαρύται) paid together a hundred and seventy talents; this was the seventh province

— Herodotus, III 91.

The Indians also supplied Yaka wood (teak) for the construction of Achaemenid palaces, as well as war elephants such as those used at Gaugamela. The Susa inscriptions of Darius explain that Indian ivory and teak were sold on Persian markets, and used in the construction of his palace.

== Achaemenid army ==
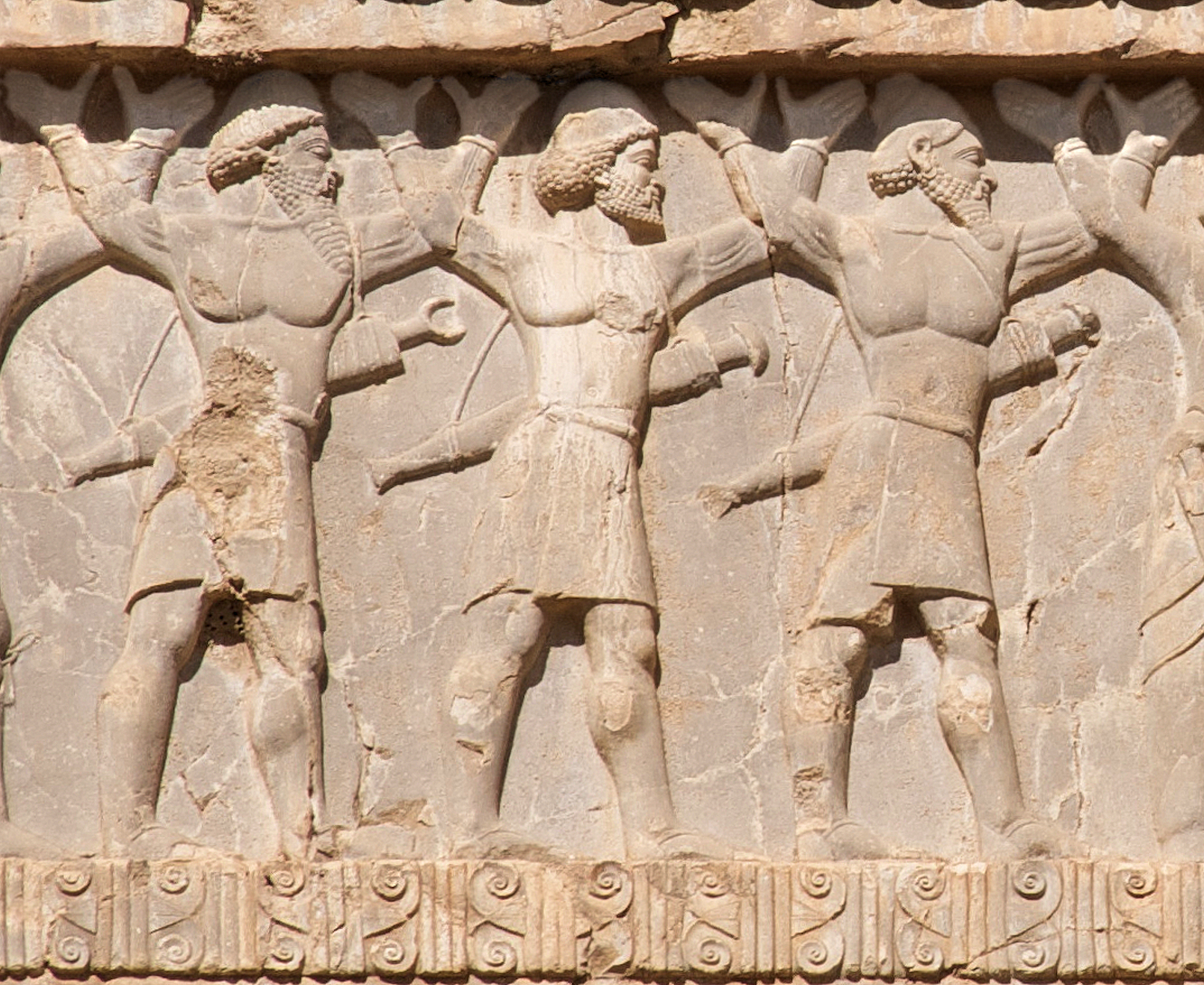
Soldiers of the three territories of Sattagydia, Gandhara and Hindush respectively, supporting the throne of Xerxes I on his tomb at Naqsh-e Rostam. See also complete relief. c. 480 BCE.

=== Second Persian invasion of Greece (480-479 BCE) ===
Indians were employed in the Achaemenid army of Xerxes in the Second Persian invasion of Greece (480–479 BCE). All troops were stationed in Sardis, Lydia, during the winter of 481–480 BCE to prepare for the invasion. In the spring of 480 BCE "Indian troops marched with Xerxes's army across the Hellespont". It was the "first-ever force from India to fight on the continent of Europe", storming Greek troops at the Battle of Thermopylae in 480 BCE, and fighting as one of the main nations until the final Battle of Plataea in 479 BCE.

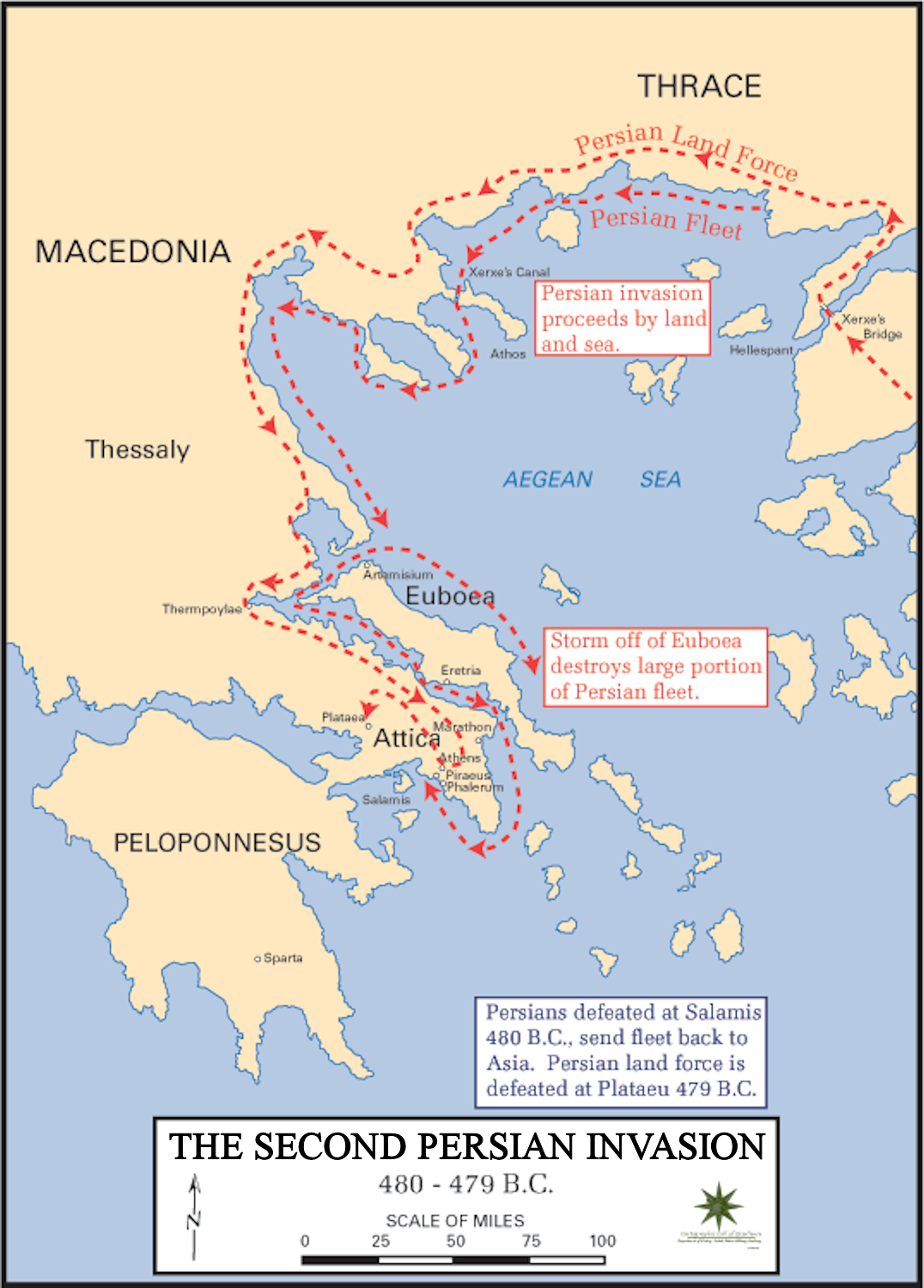
Indian soldiers of the Achaemenid army participated to the Second Persian invasion of Greece (480-479 BCE)

Herodotus, in his description of the multi-ethnic Achaemenid army invading Greece, described the equipment of the Indians:

The Indians wore garments of tree-wool, and carried bows of reed and iron-tipped arrows of the same. Such was their equipment; they were appointed to march under the command of Pharnazathres son of Artabates.

— Herodotus VII 65

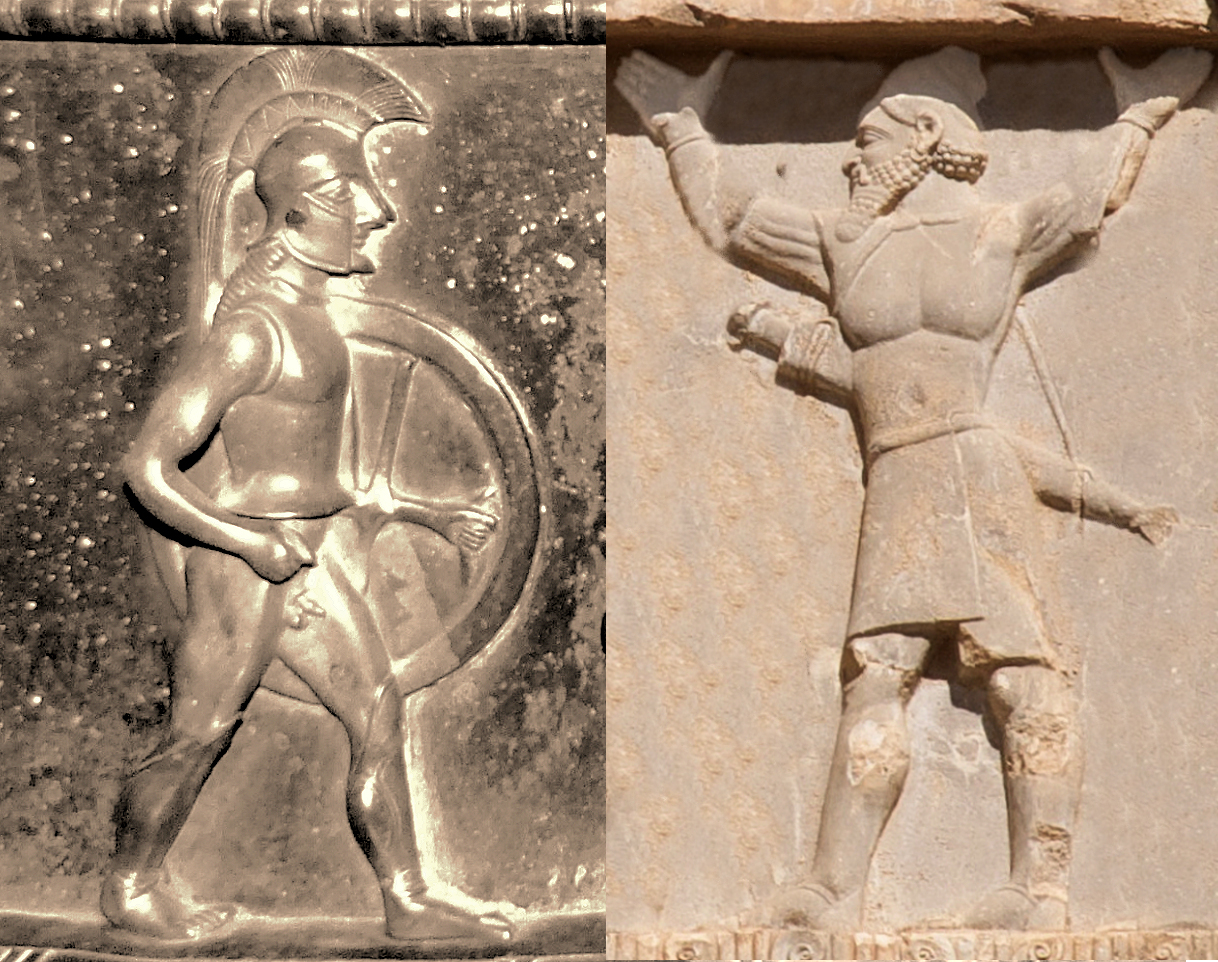
Probable Spartan hoplite (Vix crater, c. 500 BCE), and a Hindush warrior of the Achaemenid army (tomb of Xerxes I, c. 480 BCE), at the time of the Second Persian invasion of Greece (480–479 BCE)

Herodotus also explains that the Indian cavalry under the Achaemenids had an equipment similar to that of their foot soldiers:

The Indians were armed in like manner as their foot; they rode swift horses and drove chariots drawn by horses and wild asses.

— Herodotus VII 86

The Gandarians had a different equipment, akin to that of the Bactrians:

The Bactrians in the army wore a headgear most like to the Median, carrying their native bows of reed, and short spears. (...) The Parthians, Chorasmians, Sogdians, Gandarians, and Dadicae in the army had the same equipment as the Bactrians. The Parthians and Chorasmians had for their commander Artabazus son of Pharnaces, the Sogdians Azanes son of Artaeus, the Gandarians and Dadicae Artyphius son of Artabanus.

— Herodotus VII 64-66

=== Destruction of Athens and Battle of Plataea (479 BCE) ===
After the first part of the campaign directly under the orders Xerxes I, the Indian troops are reported to have stayed in Greece as one of the 5 main nations among the 300,000 elite troops of General Mardonius. They fought in the last stages of the war, took part in the Destruction of Athens, but were finally vanquished at the Battle of Plataea:

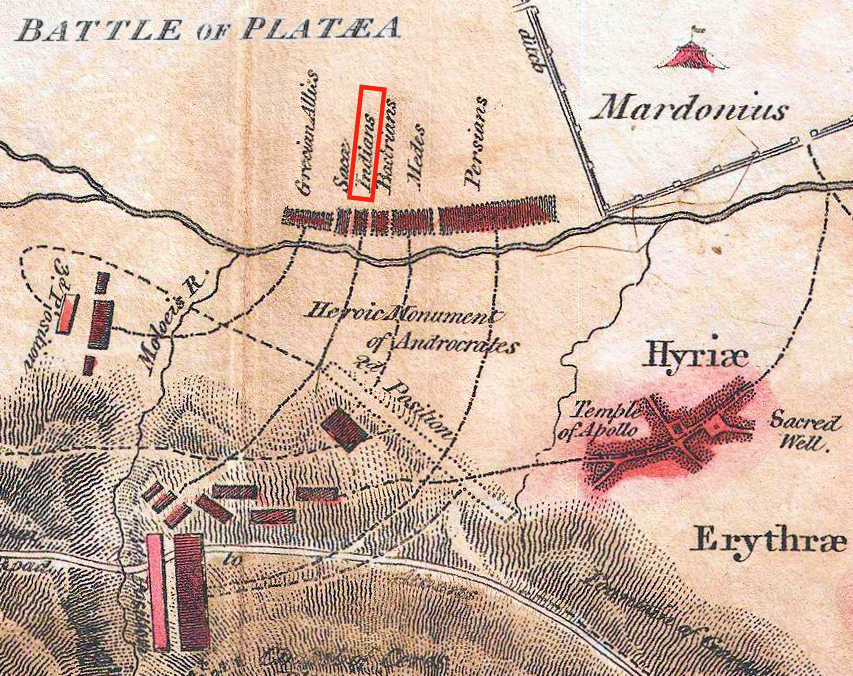
Indian corps at the Battle of Plataea, 479 BCE

Mardonius there chose out first all the Persians called Immortals, save only Hydarnes their general, who said that he would not quit the king's person; and next, the Persian cuirassiers, and the thousand horse, and the Medes and Sacae and Bactrians and Indians, alike their footmen and the rest of the horsemen. He chose these nations entire; of the rest of his allies he picked out a few from each people, the goodliest men and those that he knew to have done some good service... Thereby the whole number, with the horsemen, grew to three hundred thousand men.

— Herodotus VIII, 113.

At the final Battle of Plataea in 479 BCE, Indians formed one of the main corps of Achaemenid troops (one of "the greatest of the nations"). They were one of the main battle corps, positioned near the center of the Achaemenid battle line, between the Bactrians and the Sakae, facing against the enemy Greek troops of "Hermione and Eretria and Styra and Chalcis". According to modern estimates, the Bactrians, Indians and Sakae probably numbered about 20,000 men altogether, whereas the Persian troops on their left amounted to about 40,000. There were also Greek allies of the Persians, positioned on the right, whom Herodotus numbers at 50,000, a number which however might be "extravagant", and is nowadays estimated to around 20,000. Indians also supplied part of the cavalry, the total of which was about 5,000.

=== Depictions ===
Indian soldiers of the three territories of Gandara, Sattagydia (Tathagatus) and Hindush are shown, together with soldiers of all the other nations, supporting the throne of their Achaemenid ruler, at Naqsh-e Rostam on the tombs of Darius I, Xerxes I, Artaxerxes I and Darius II, and at Persepolis on the tombs of Artaxerxes II and Artaxerxes III. The last Achaemenid ruler Darius III never had time to finish his own tomb due to his hasty defeat by Alexander the Great, and therefore does not have such depictions. The soldiers from India are characterized by their particular clothing, only composed of a loin cloth and sandals, with bare upper body, in contrast to all the other ethnicities of the Achaemenid army, who are fully clothed, and in contrast also to the neighbouring provinces of Bactria or Arachosia, who are also fully clothed.

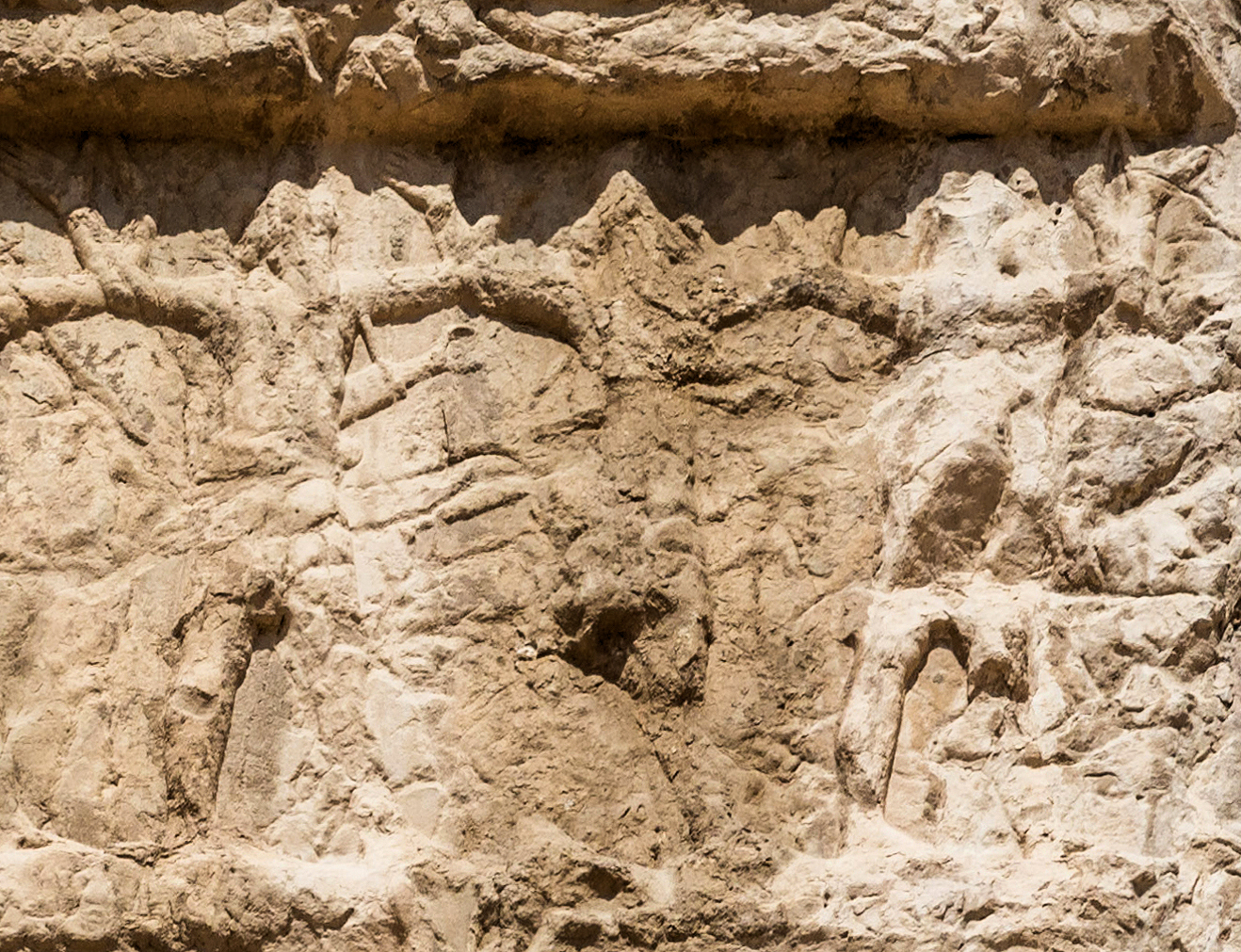
The three soldiers on the tomb of Darius I (c. 500 BCE)

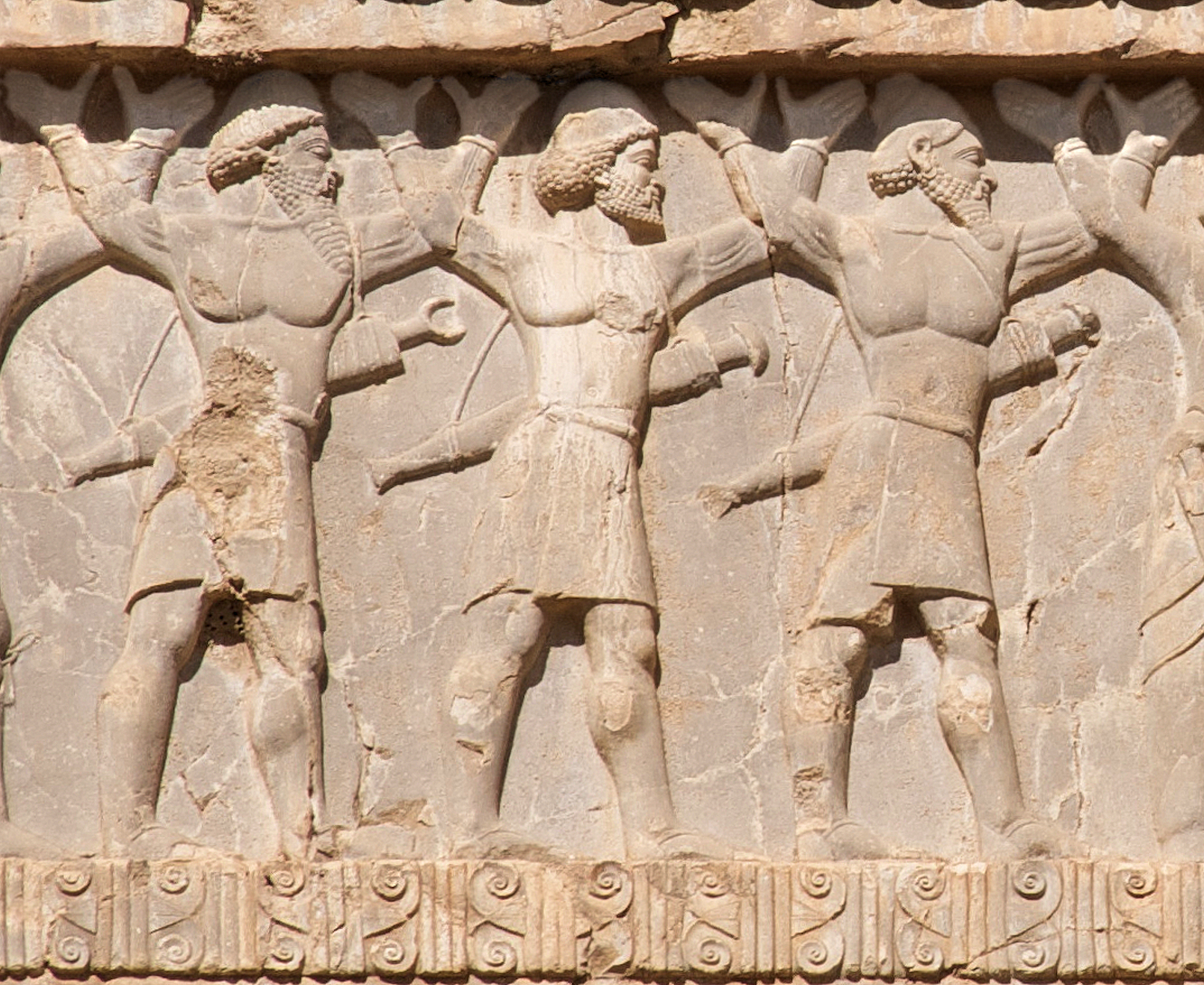
The three soldiers on the tomb of Xerxes I (c. 480 BCE)

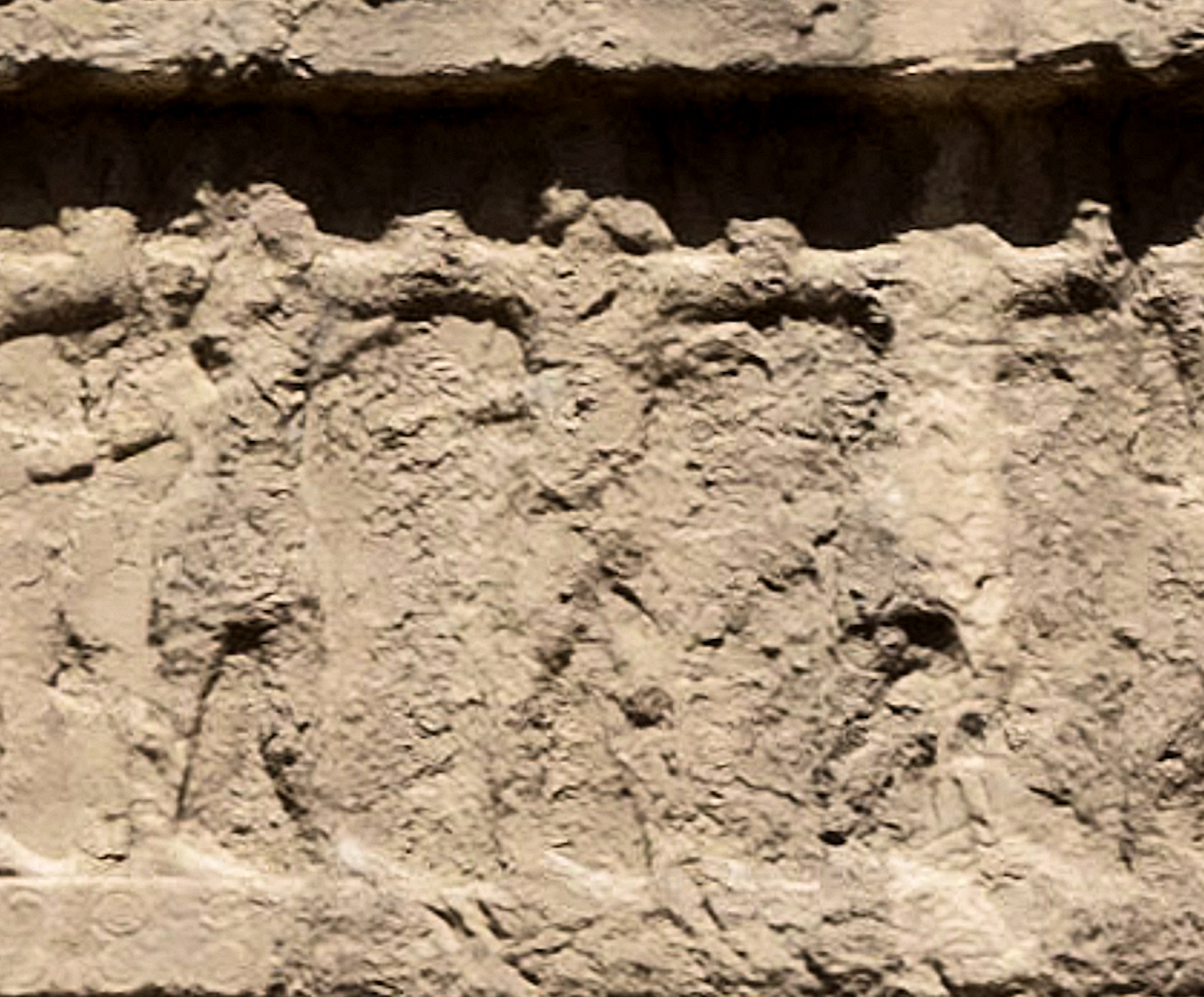
The three soldiers on the tomb of Artaxerxes I (c. 430 BCE)

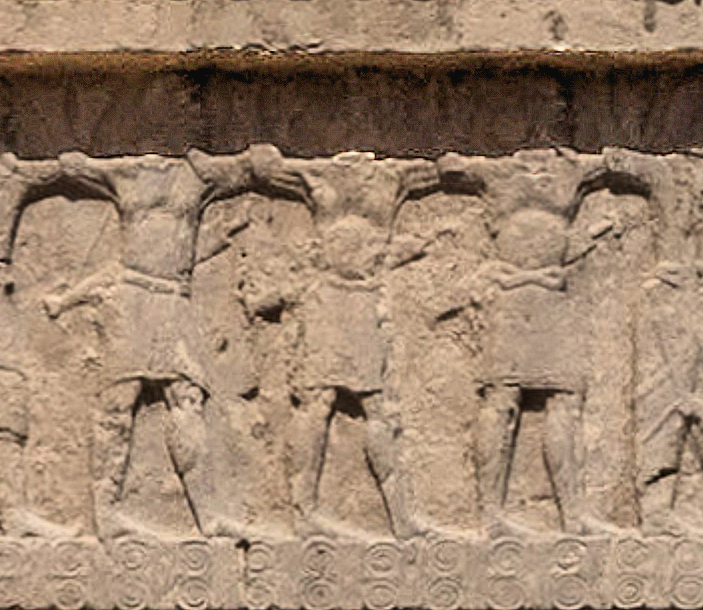
The three soldiers on the tomb of Darius II (c. 410 BCE)

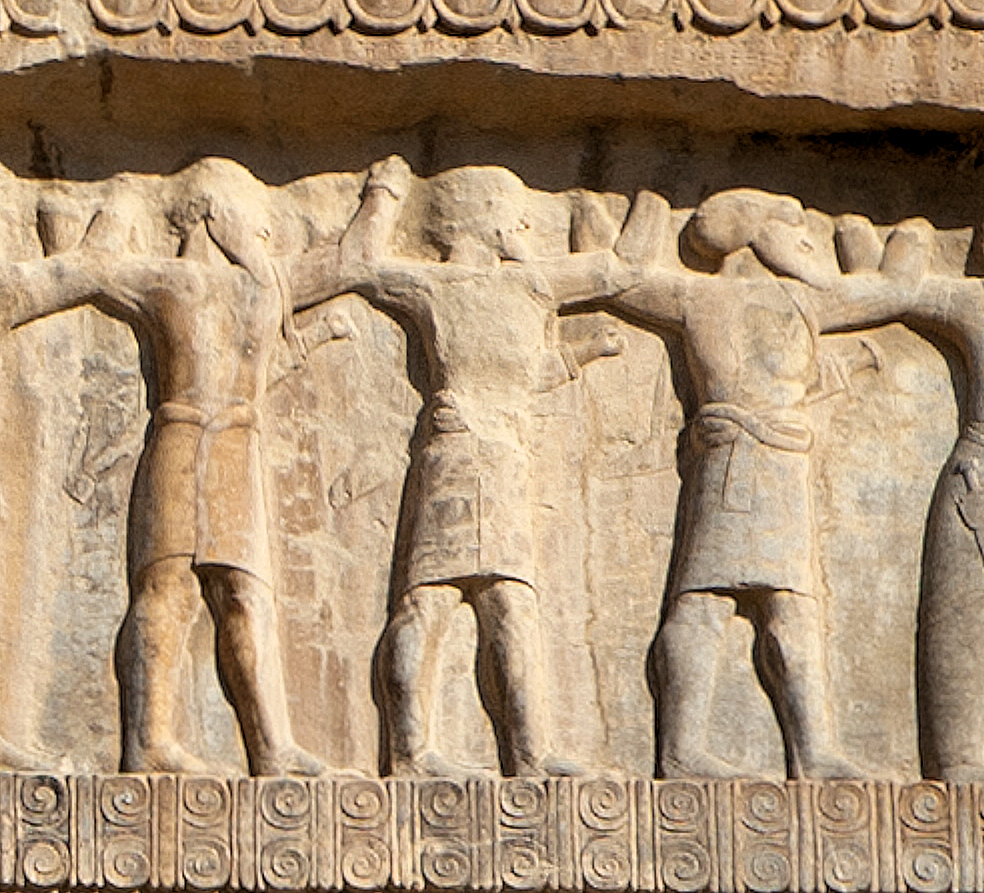
The three soldiers on the tomb of Artaxerxes II (c. 370 BCE)

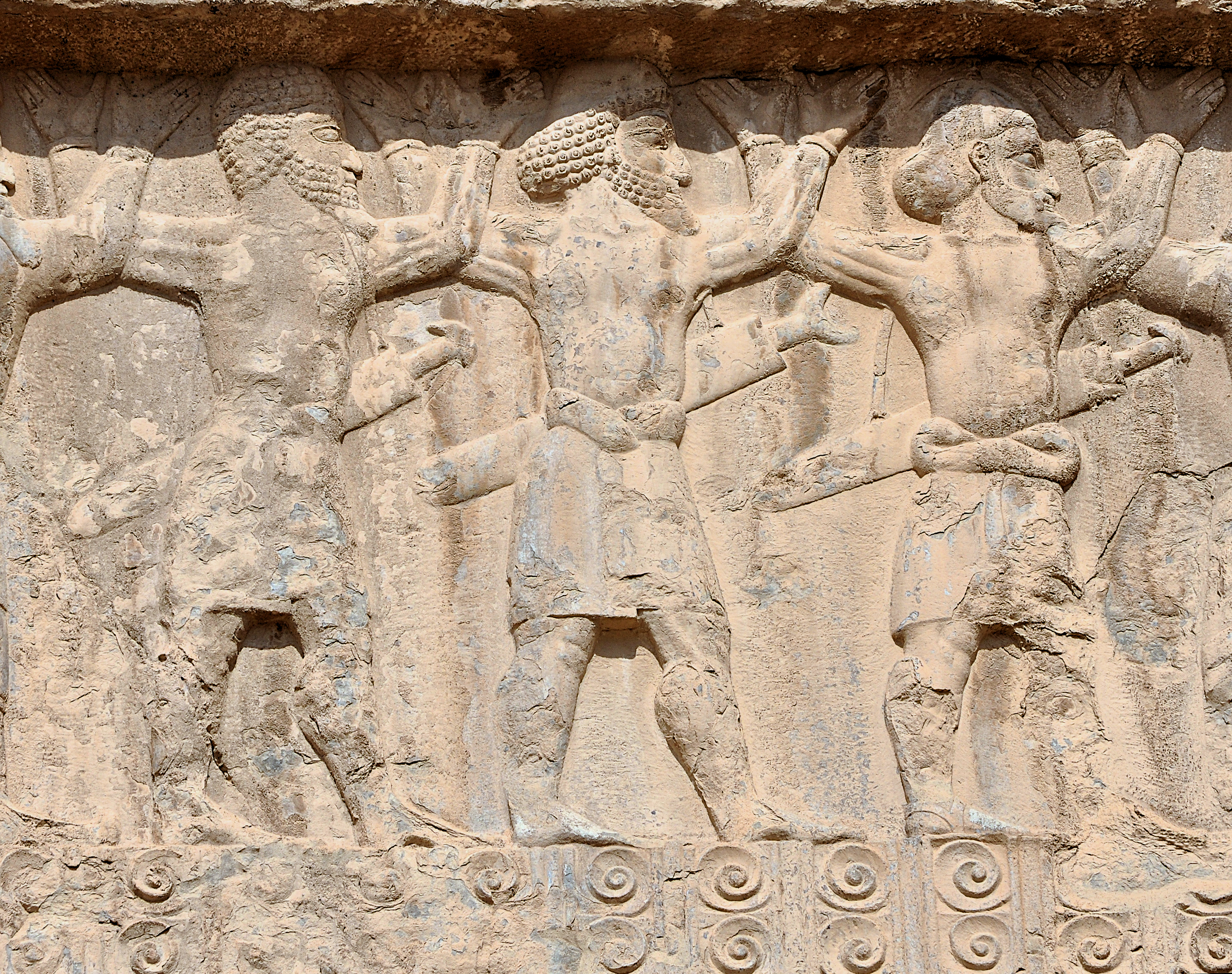
The three soldiers on the tomb of Artaxerxes III (c. 340 BCE)

=== Indians at the Battle of Gaugamela (331 BCE) ===
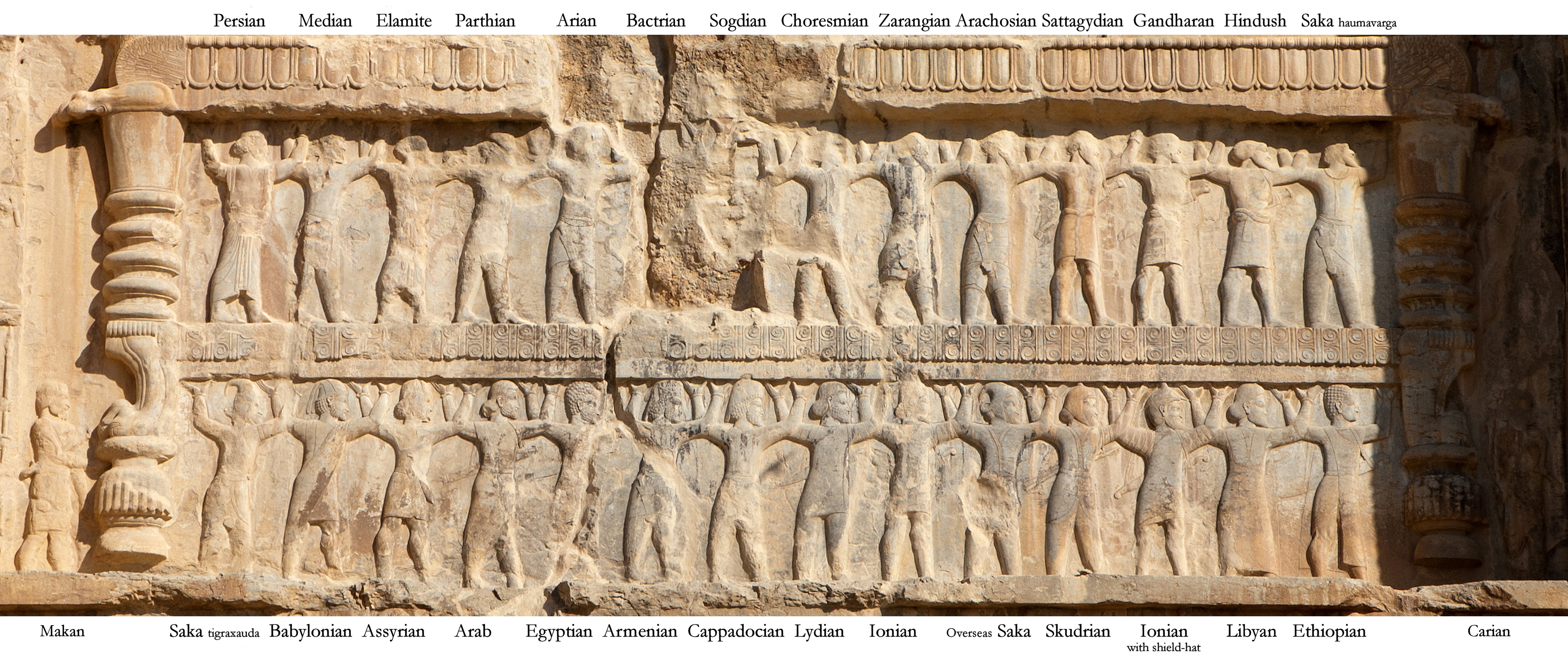
The names of the three provinces still appear in trilingual cuneiform labels above their respective figures on the tomb of Artaxerxes II (c. 358 BCE).

According to Arrian, Indian troops were still deployed under Darius III at the Battle of Gaugamela (331 BCE). He explains that Darius III "obtained the help of those Indians who bordered on the Bactrians, together with the Bactrians and Sogdianians themselves, all under the command of Bessus, the Satrap of Bactria". The Indians in questions were probably from the area of Gandara. Indian "hill-men" are also said by Arrian to have joined the Arachotians under Satrap Barsentes, and are thought to have been either the Sattagydians or the Hindush.

Fifteen Indian war elephants were also part of the army of Darius III at Gaugamela. They had specifically been brought from India. Still, it seems they did not participate to the final battle, probably because of fatigue. This was a relief for the armies of Alexander, who had no previous experience of combat against war elephants. The elephants were captured with the baggage train by the Greeks after the engagement.

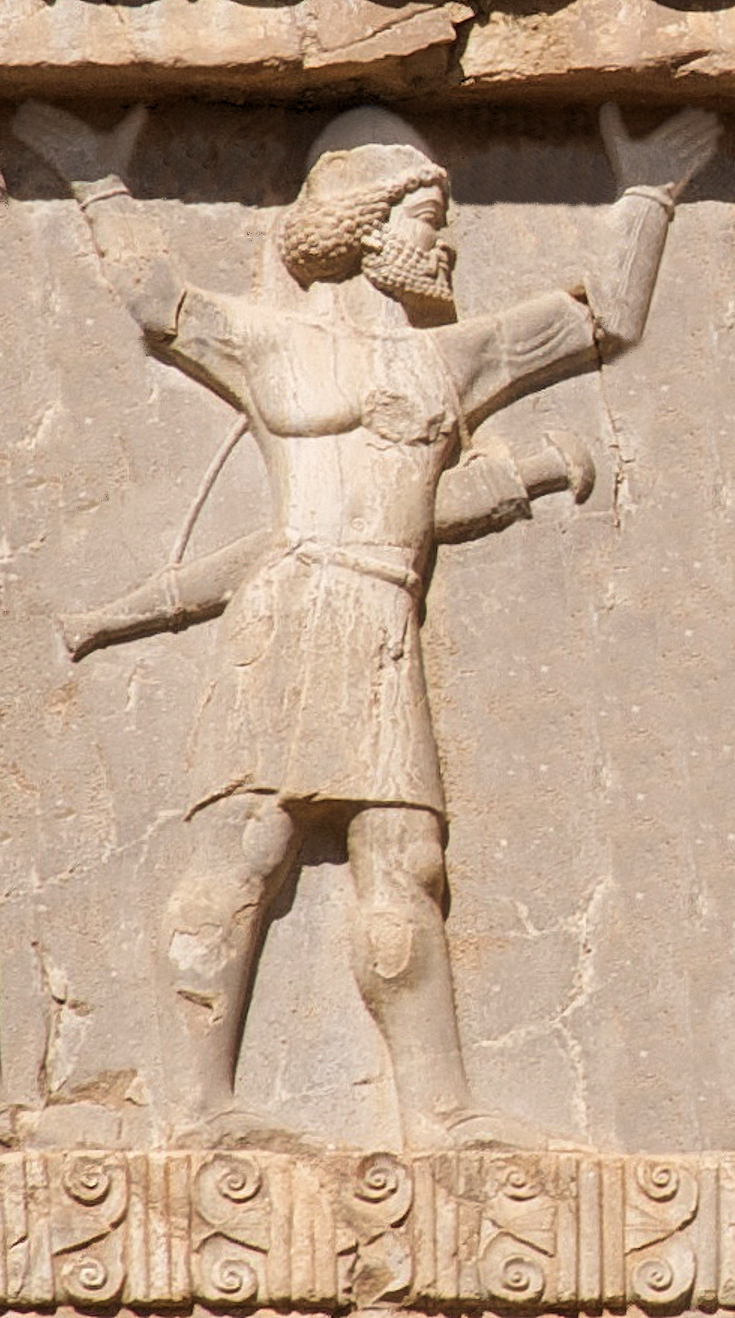
Gandaran soldier of the Achaemenid army, c. 480 BCE. Xerxes I tomb.

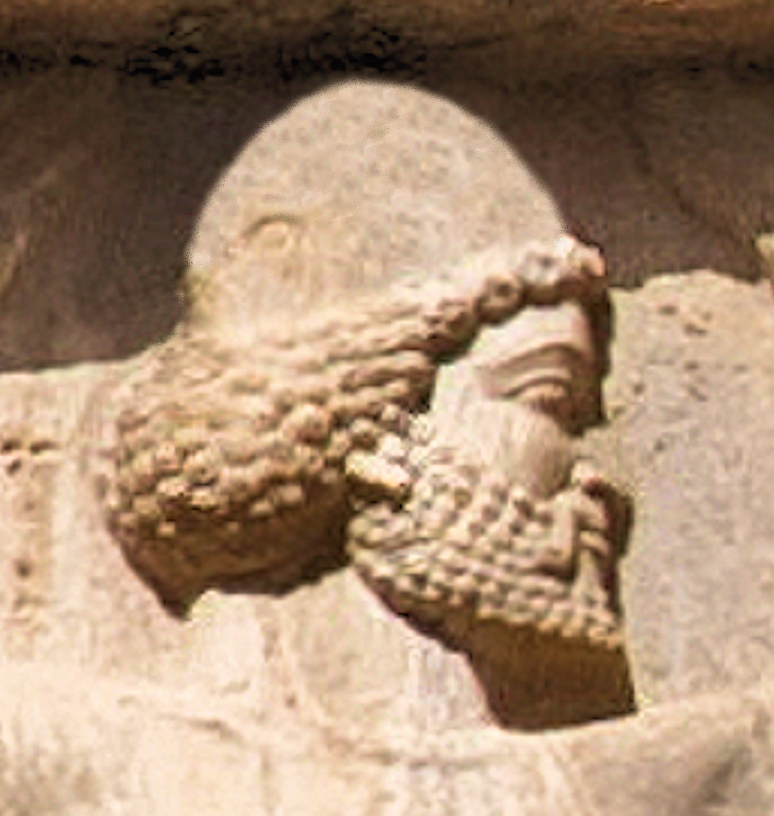
Gandaran soldier (enhanced detail)

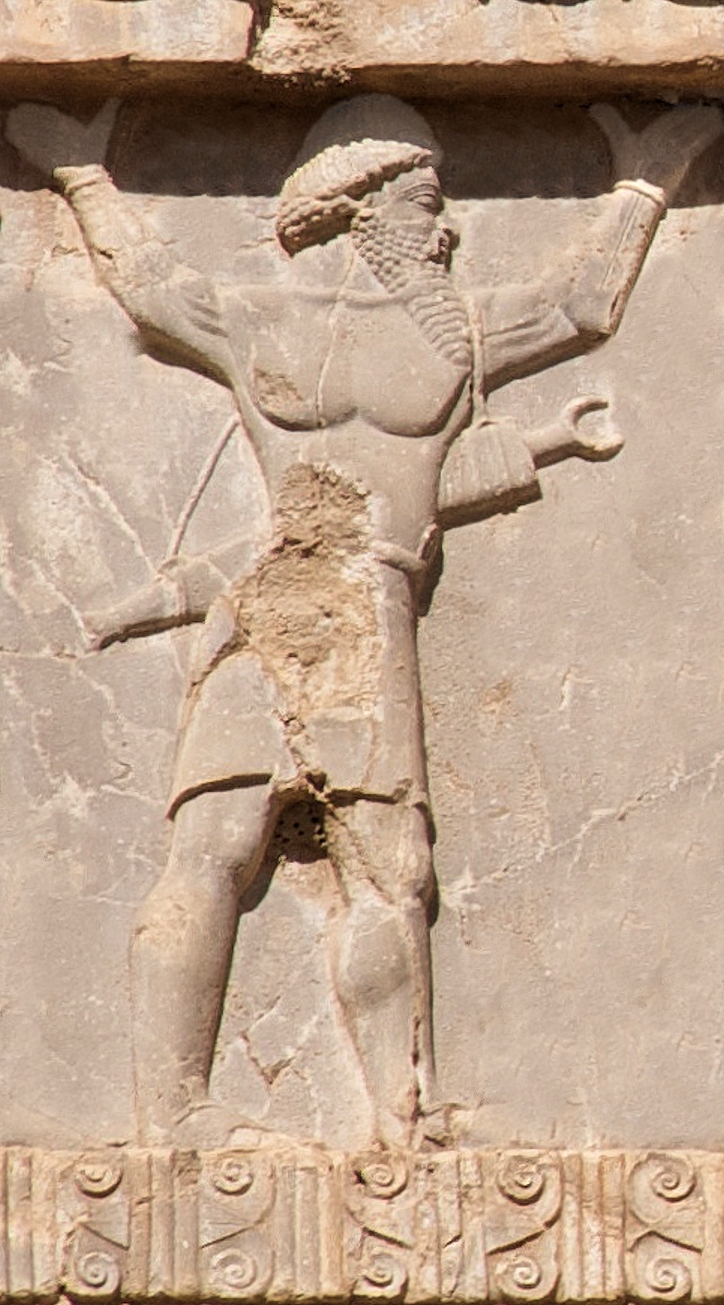
Sattagydian soldier of the Achaemenid army, c. 480 BCE. Xerxes I tomb.

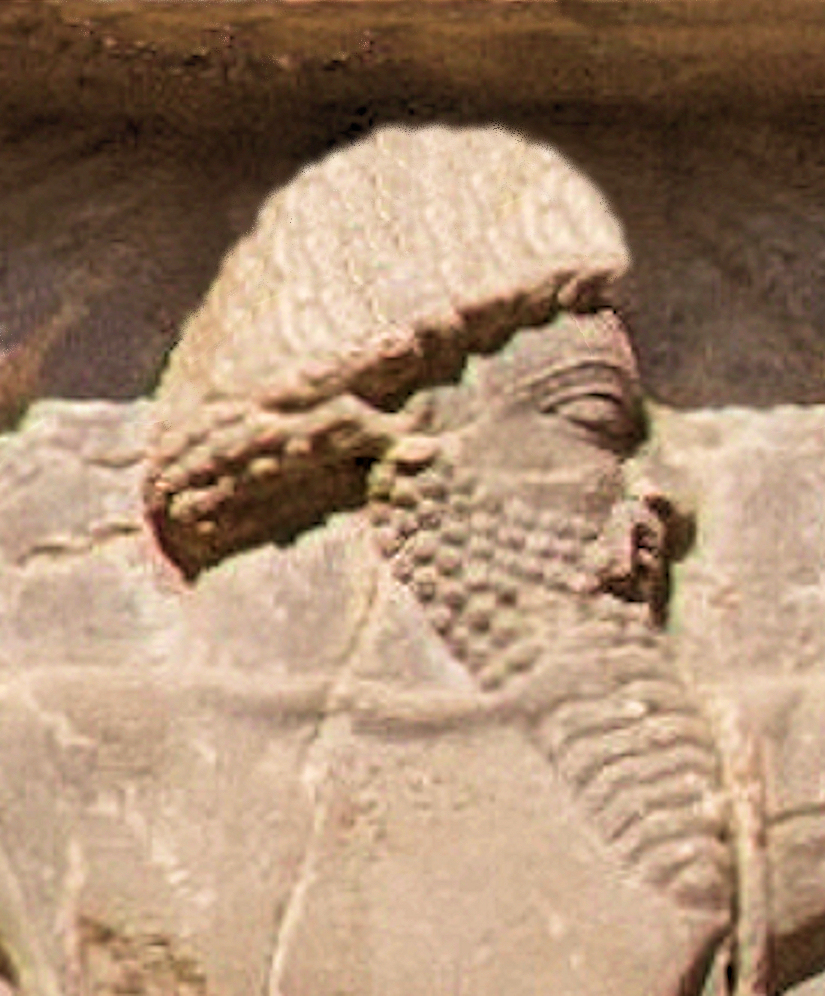
Sattagydian soldier (enhanced detail)

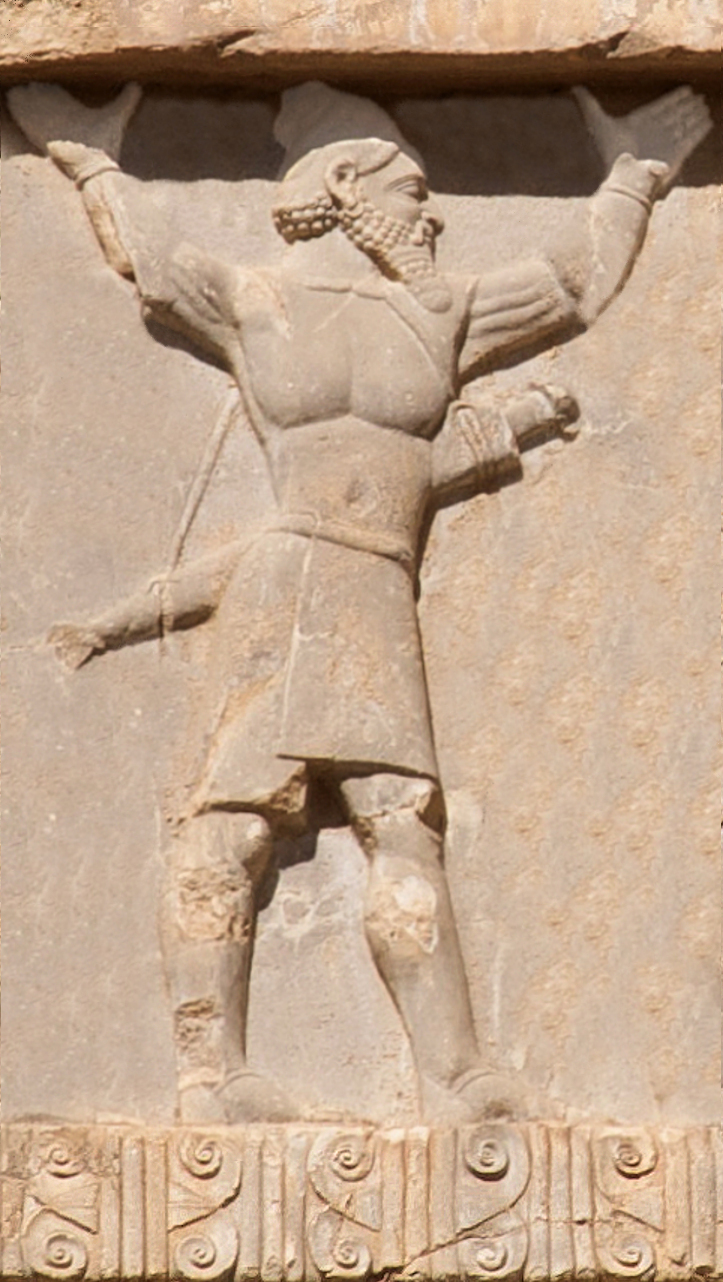
Hindush soldier of the Achaemenid army, c. 480 BCE. Xerxes I tomb.

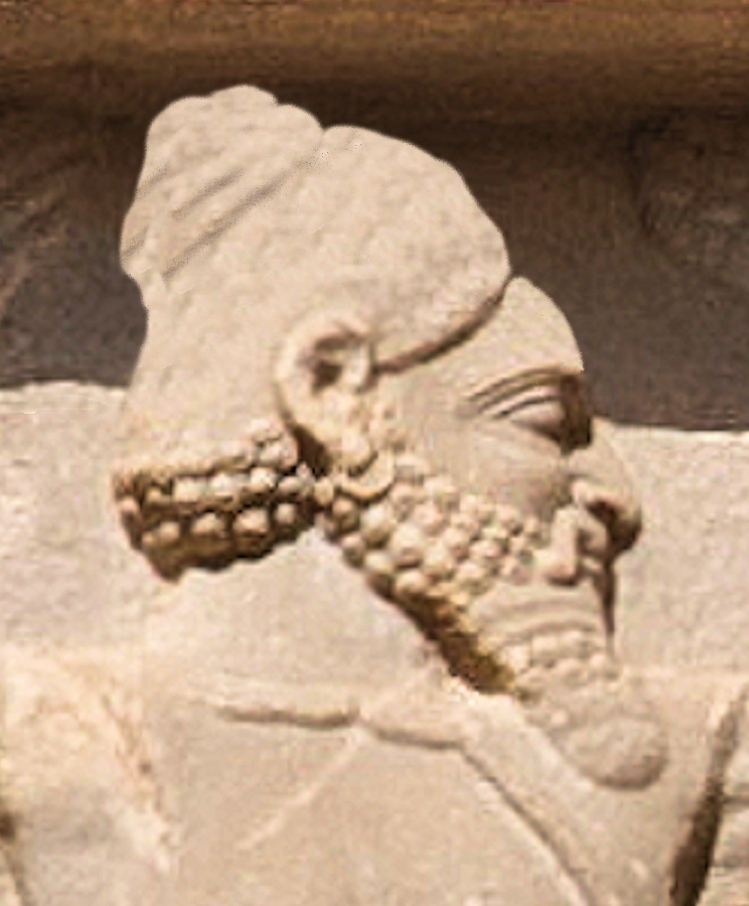
Hindush soldier (enhanced detail)

== Achaemenid and Greek coinage ==
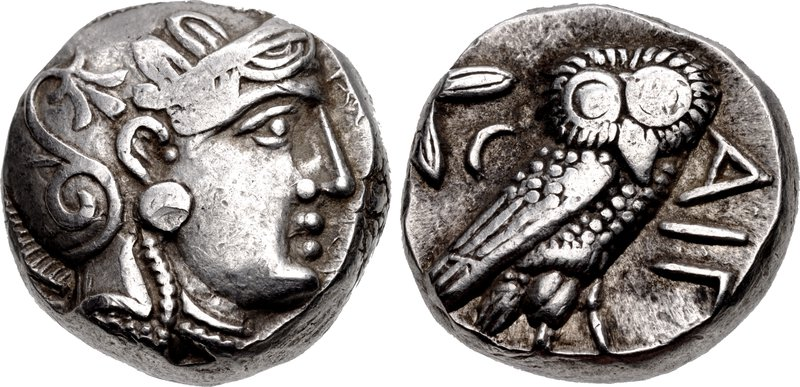
Achaemenid coin, an imitation of an Athenian coin type, of the sort found in the Kabul hoard

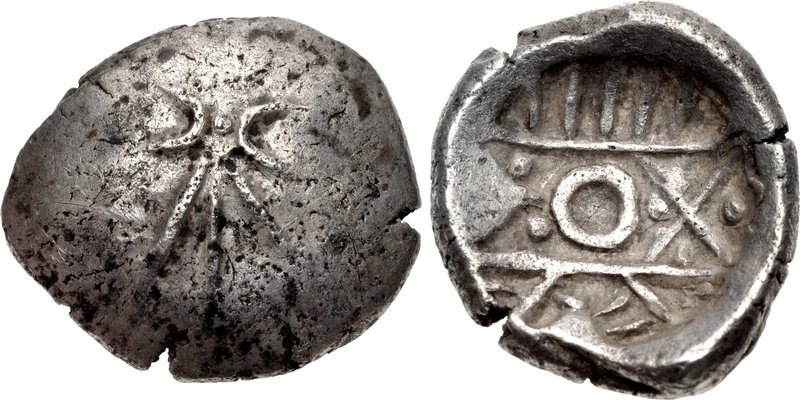
Achaemenid Empire coin minted in the Kabul Valley, c. 500–380 BCE.

Coins found in the Chaman Hazouri hoard in Kabul, the Shaikhan Dehri hoard in Pushkalavati in Gandhara, near Charsadda, as well as in the Bhir Mound hoard in Taxila, have revealed numerous Achaemenid coins as well as many Greek coins from the 5th and 4th centuries BCE. These circulated in the area, at least as far as the Indus during the reign of the Achaemenids, who were in control of the areas as far as Gandhara.

=== Kabul and Bhir Mound hoards ===
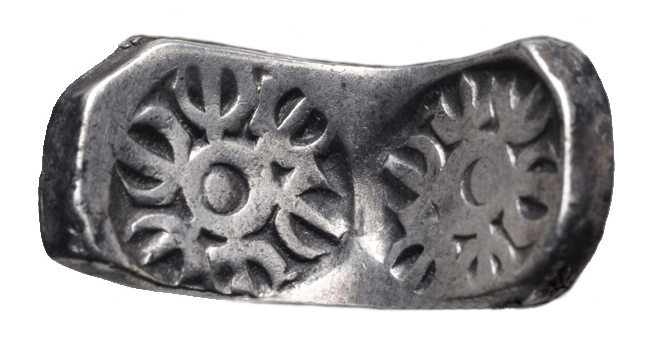
"Bent bar" minted under Achaemenid administration, of the type found in large quantities in the Chaman Hazouri hoard and the Bhir Mound hoard in Taxila

The Kabul hoard, also called the Chaman Hazouri, Chaman Hazouri or Tchamani-i Hazouri hoard, is a coin hoard discovered in the vicinity of Kabul, Afghanistan. The hoard, discovered in 1933, contained numerous Achaemenid coins as well as many Greek coins from the 5th and 4th centuries BCE. Approximately one thousand coins were in the hoard. The hoard is dated to approximately 380 BCE as no coins in the hoard were later than that date.

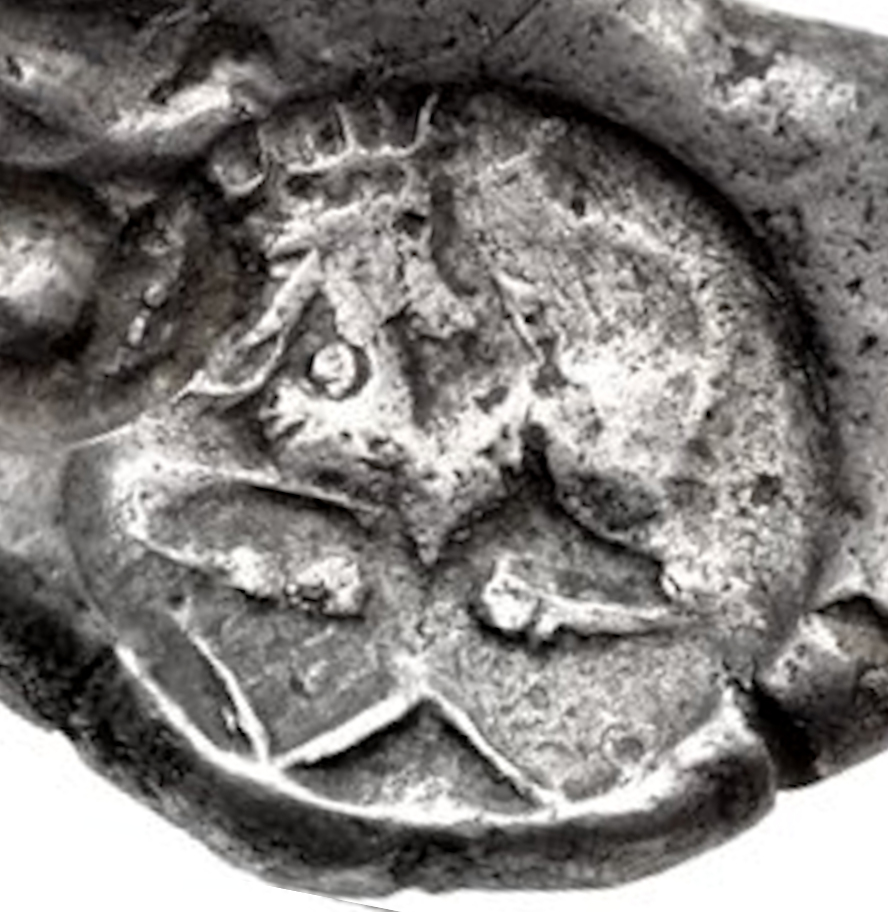
Strike of an Achaemenid siglos, Kabul, Afghanistan, c. 5th century BCE. Archer king type. Coins of this type were also found in the Bhir Mound hoard in Taxila.

This numismatic discovery has been very important in studying and dating the history of coinage of India, since it is one of the very rare instances when punch-marked coins can actually be dated, due to their association with known and dated Greek and Achaemenid coins in the hoard. The hoard supports the view that punch-marked coins existed in 360 BCE, as suggested by literary evidence.

Daniel Schlumberger also considers that punch-marked bars, similar to the many punch-marked bars found in north-western India, initially originated in the Achaemenid Empire, rather than in the Indian heartland:

The punch-marked bars were up to now considered to be Indian (...) However the weight standard is considered by some expert to be Persian, and now that we see them also being uncovered in the soil of Afghanistan, we must take into account the possibility that their country of origin should not be sought beyond the Indus, but rather in the oriental provinces of the Achaemenid Empire

— Daniel Schlumberger, quoted from Trésors Monétaires, p.42.

Modern numismatists now tend to consider the Achaemenid punch-marked coins as the precursors of the Indian punch-marked coins.

=== Pushkalavati hoard ===
In 2007, a small coin hoard was discovered at the site of ancient Pushkalavati (the Shaikhan Dehri hoard) near Charsada in Pakistan. The hoard contained a tetradrachm minted in Athens circa 500/490-485/0 BCE, typically used as a currency for trade in the Achaemenid Empire, together with a number of local types as well as silver cast ingots. The Athens coin is the earliest known example of its type to be found so far to the east.

According to Joe Cribb, these early Greek coins were at the origin of Indian punch-marked coins, the earliest coins developed in India, which used minting technology derived from Greek coinage.

== Cultural exchange ==
=== Palatial art and architecture: Pataliputra ===
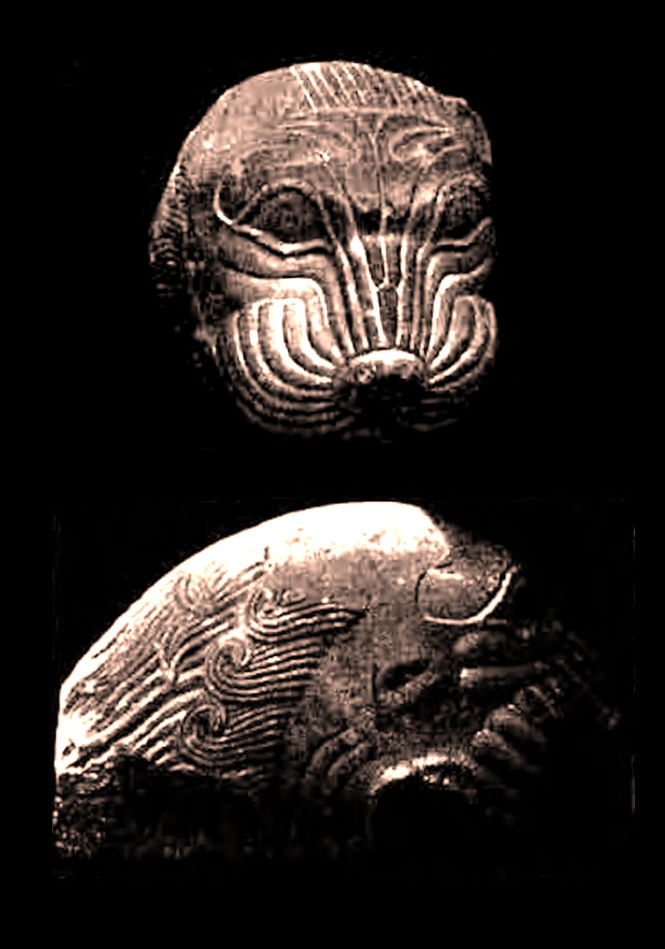
The Masarh lion. The sculptural style is "unquestionably Achaemenid".

Various Indian artefacts tend to suggest some Perso-Hellenistic artistic influence in India, mainly felt during the time of the Mauryan Empire. The sculpture of the Masarh lion, found near the Maurya capital of Pataliputra, raises the question of the Achaemenid and Greek influence on the art of the Maurya Empire, and on the western origins of stone carving in India. The lion is carved in Chunar sandstone, like the Pillars of Ashoka, and its finish is polished, a feature of the Maurya sculpture. According to S.P. Gupta, the sculptural style is unquestionably Achaemenid. This is particularly the case for the well-ordered tubular representation of whiskers (vibrissas) and the geometrical representation of inflated veins flush with the entire face. The mane, on the other hand, with tufts of hair represented in wavelets, is rather naturalistic. Very similar examples are however known in Greece and Persepolis. It is possible that this sculpture was made by an Achaemenid or Greek sculptor in India and either remained without effect, or was the Indian imitation of a Greek or Achaemenid model, somewhere between the fifth century B.C. and the first century BC, although it is generally dated from the time of the Maurya Empire, around the 3rd century BC.

The Pataliputra palace with its pillared hall shows decorative influences of the Achaemenid palaces and Persepolis and may have used the help of foreign craftsmen. Mauryan rulers may have even imported craftsmen from abroad to build royal monuments. This may be the result of the formative influence of craftsmen employed from Persia following the disintegration of the Achaemenid Empire after the conquests of Alexander the Great. The Pataliputra capital, or also the Hellenistic friezes of the Rampurva capitals, Sankissa, and the diamond throne of Bodh Gaya are other examples.

The renowned Mauryan polish, especially used in the Pillars of Ashoka, may also have been a technique imported from the Achaemenid Empire.

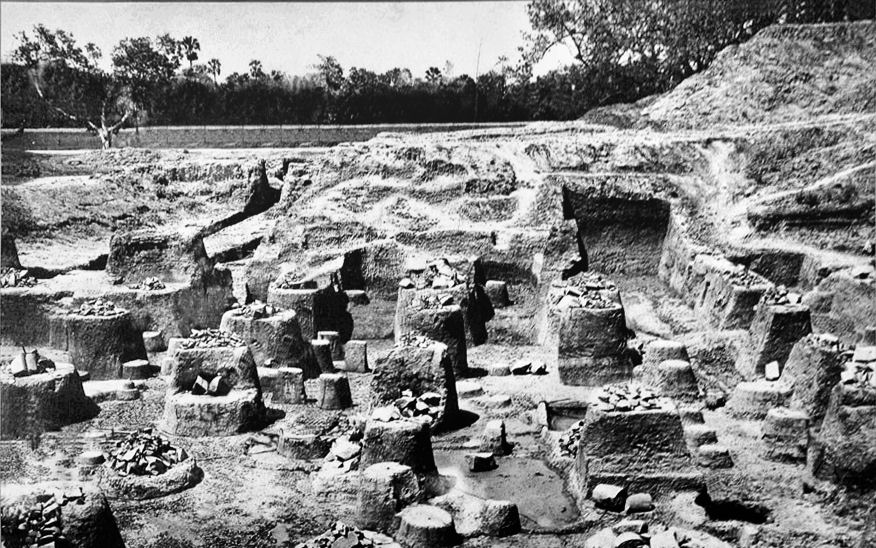
Ruins of pillared hall at Kumrahar site at Pataliputra

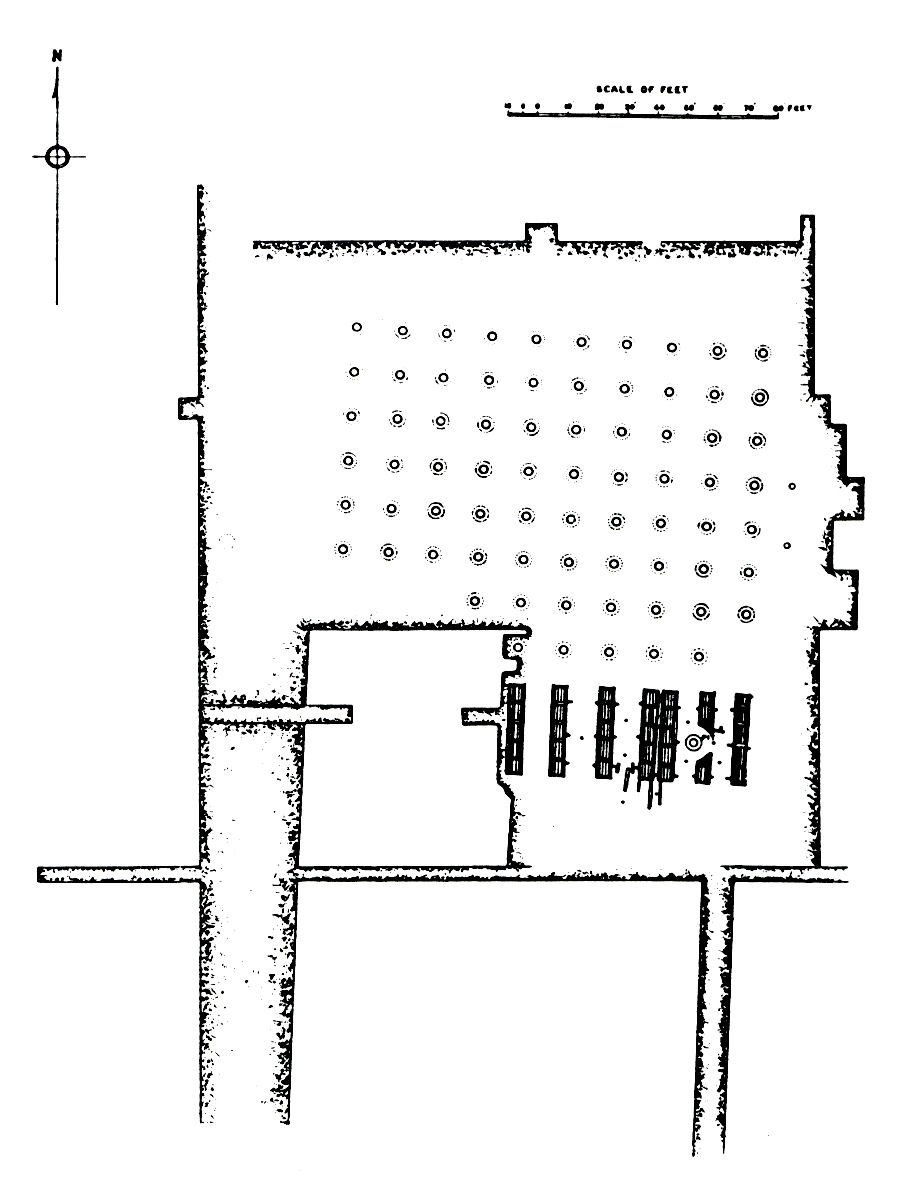
Plan of the 80-column pillared hall in Pataliputra

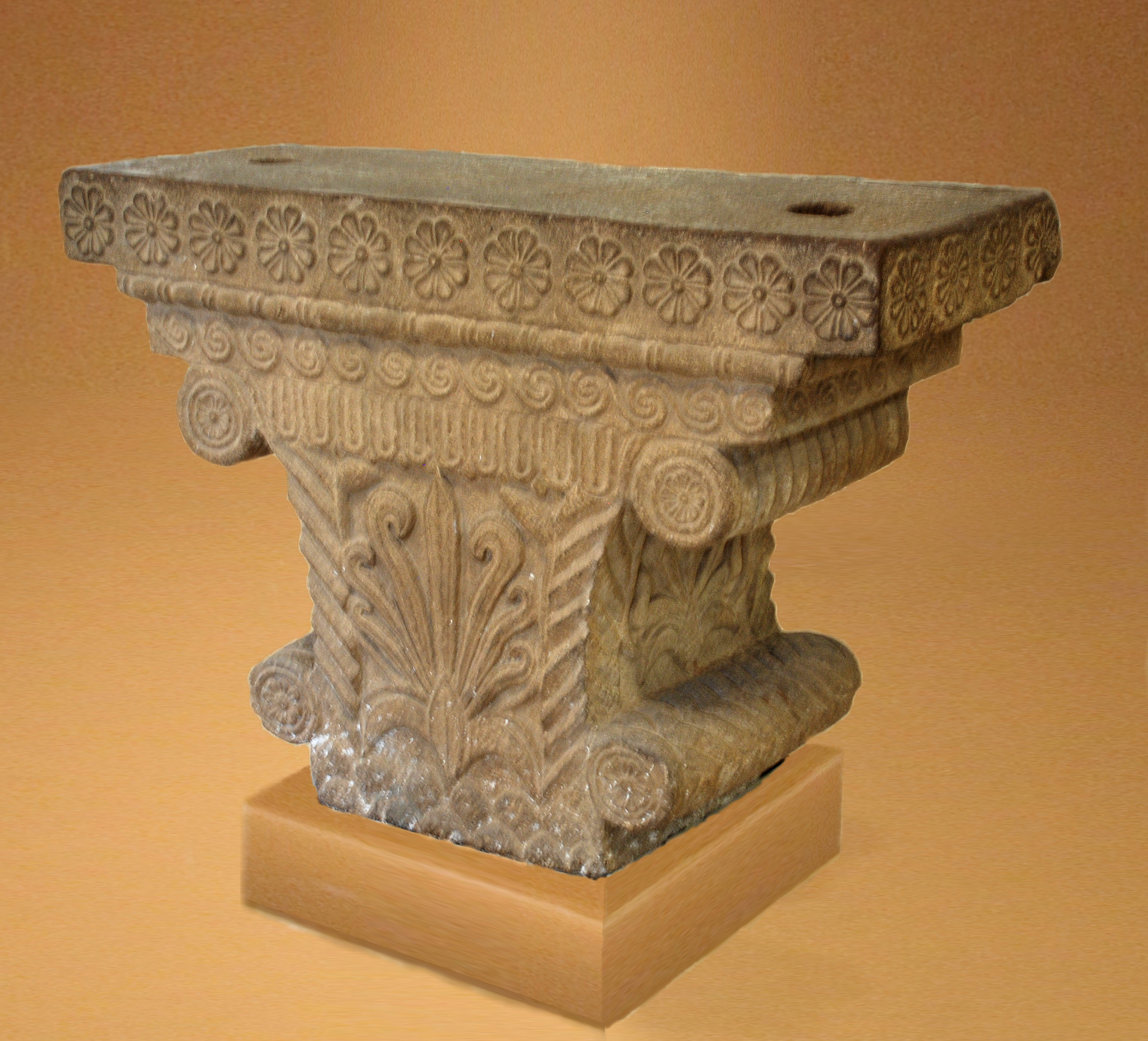
The Pataliputra capital, generally described as "Perso-Hellenistic"

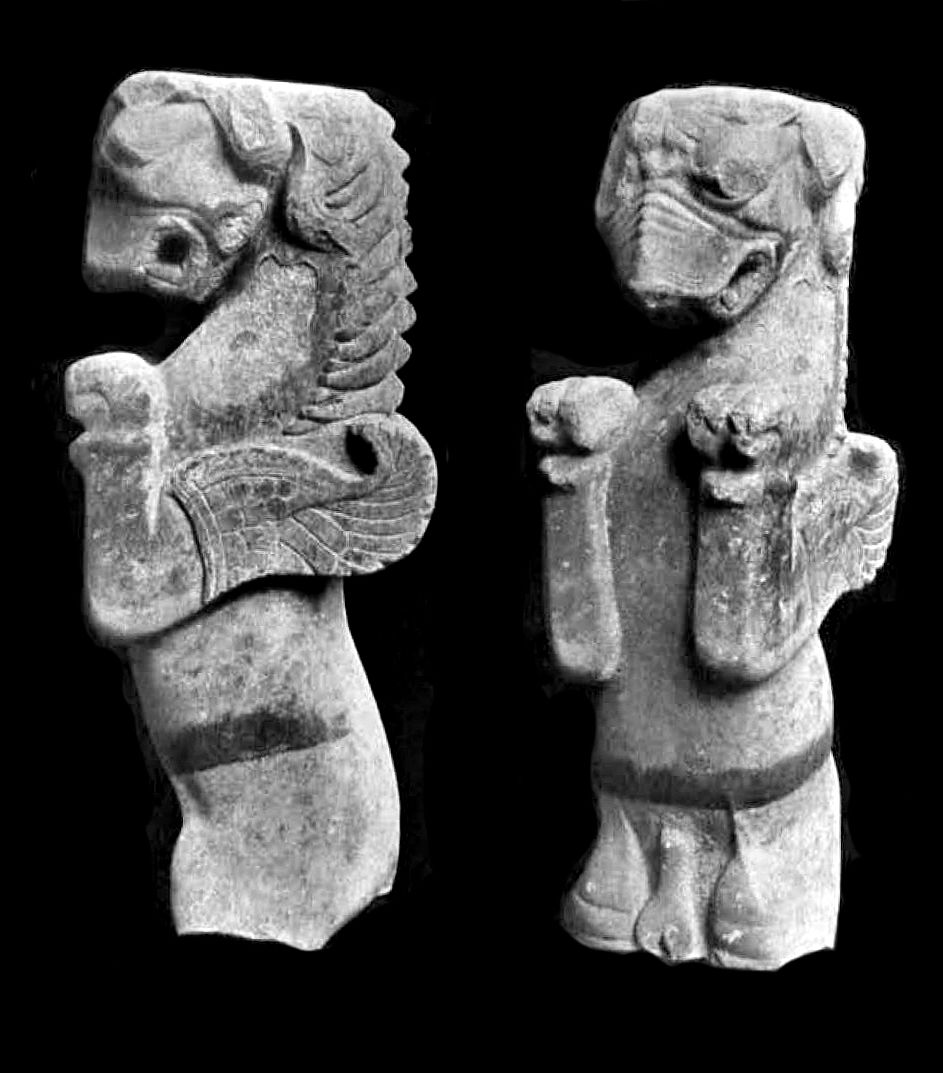
Griffin of Pataliputra

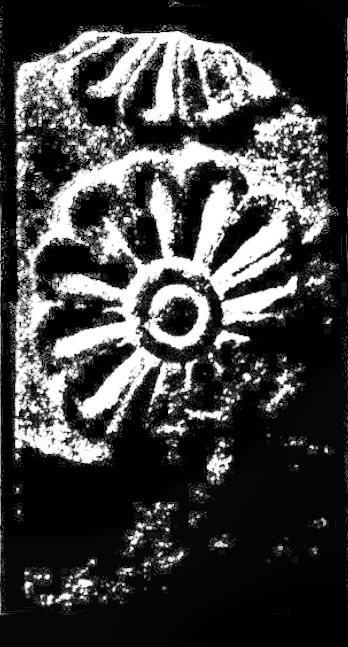
Lotus motifs in Pataliputra

=== Monumental columns: the Pillars of Ashoka ===
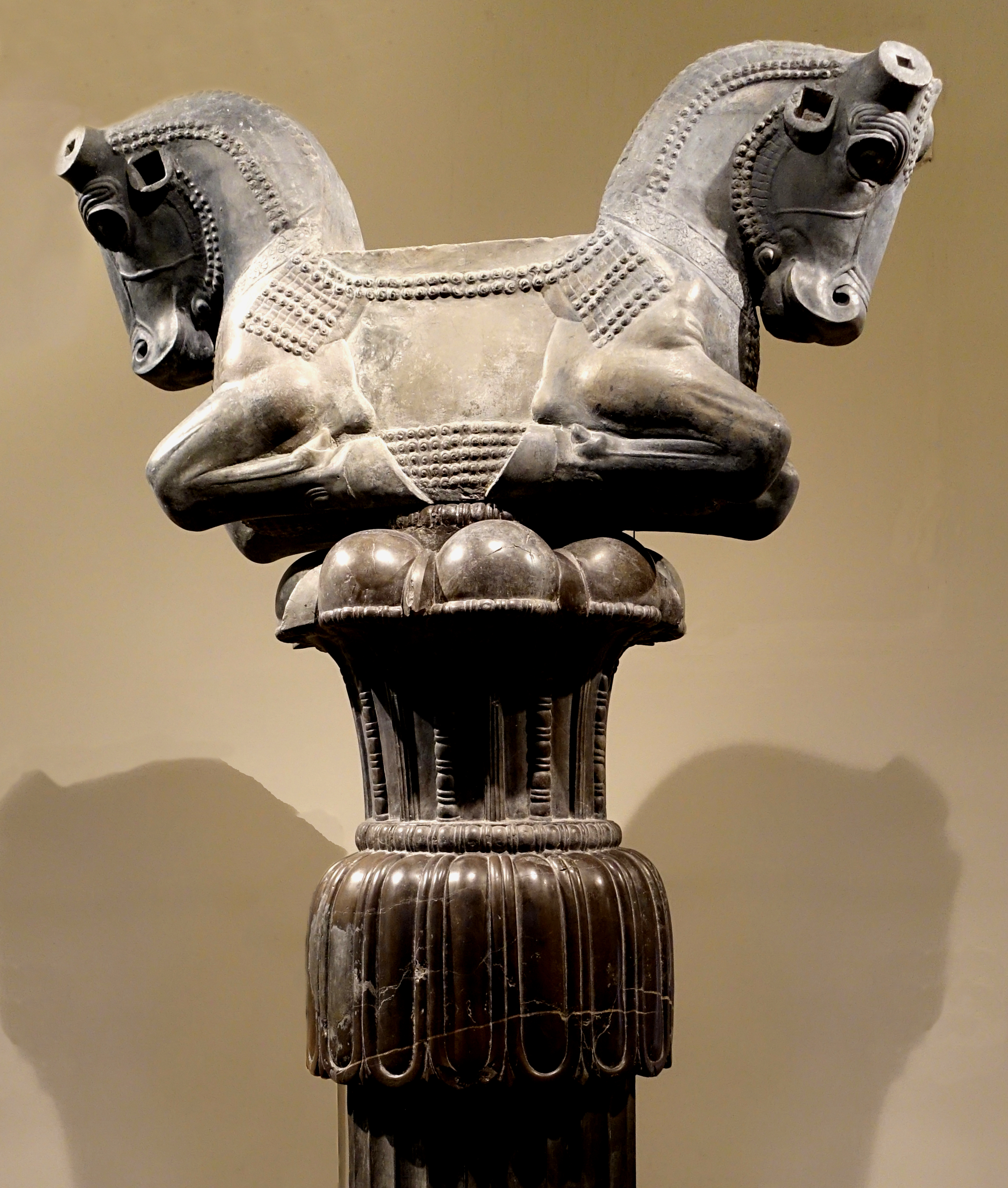
Highly polished Achaemenid load-bearing column with lotus capital and animals, Persepolis, c. 5th-4th BCE

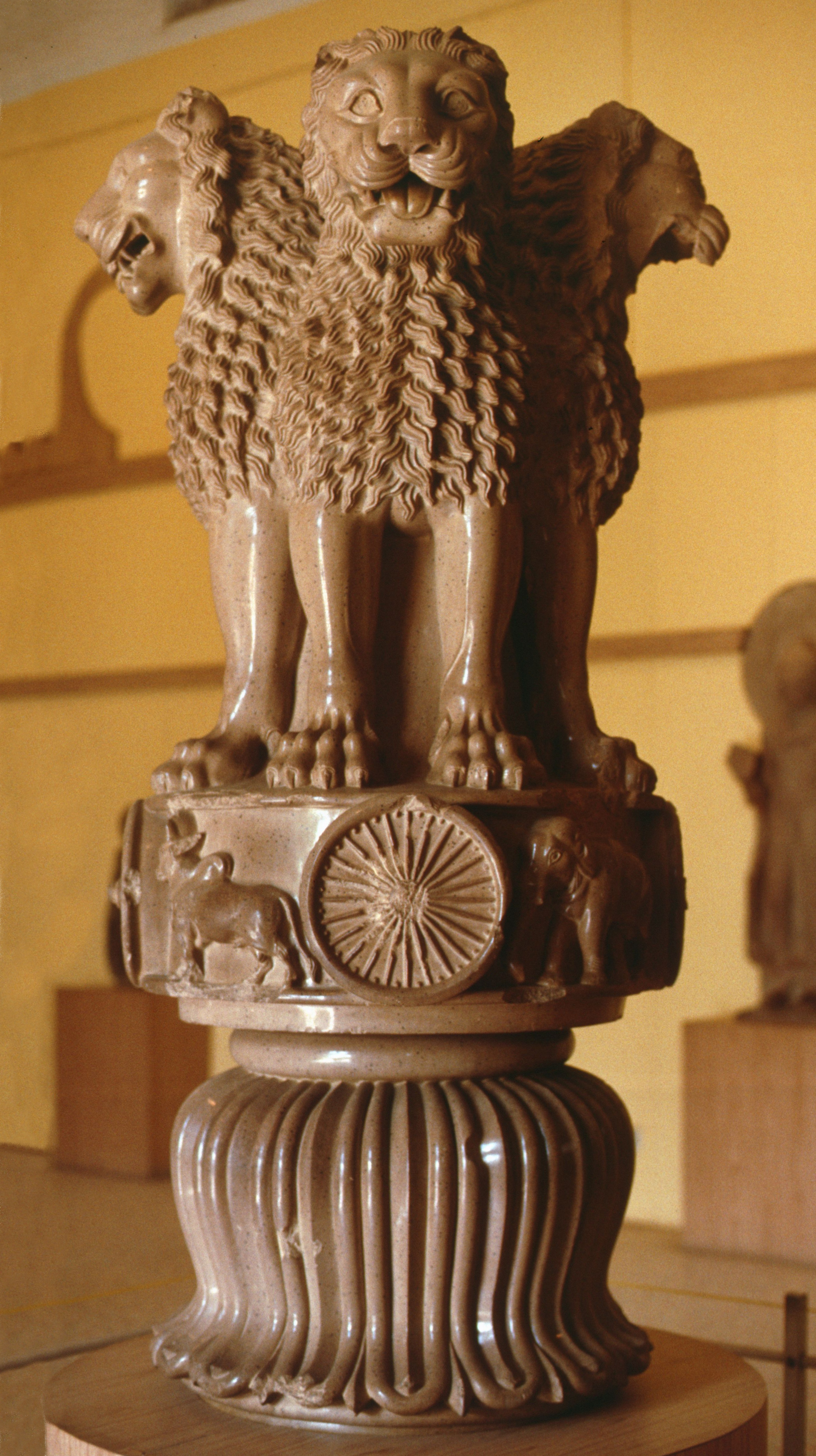
Lion Capital of Ashoka from Sarnath

Regarding the Pillars of Ashoka, there has been much discussion of the extent of influence from Achaemenid Persia, since the column capitals supporting the roofs at Persepolis have similarities, and the "rather cold, hieratic style" of the Sarnath Lion Capital of Ashoka especially shows "obvious Achaemenid and Sargonid influence".

=== Figurines of West Asian foreigners in Mathura, Sarnath and Patna (4th-2nd century BCE) ===
Figurines of foreigners in India

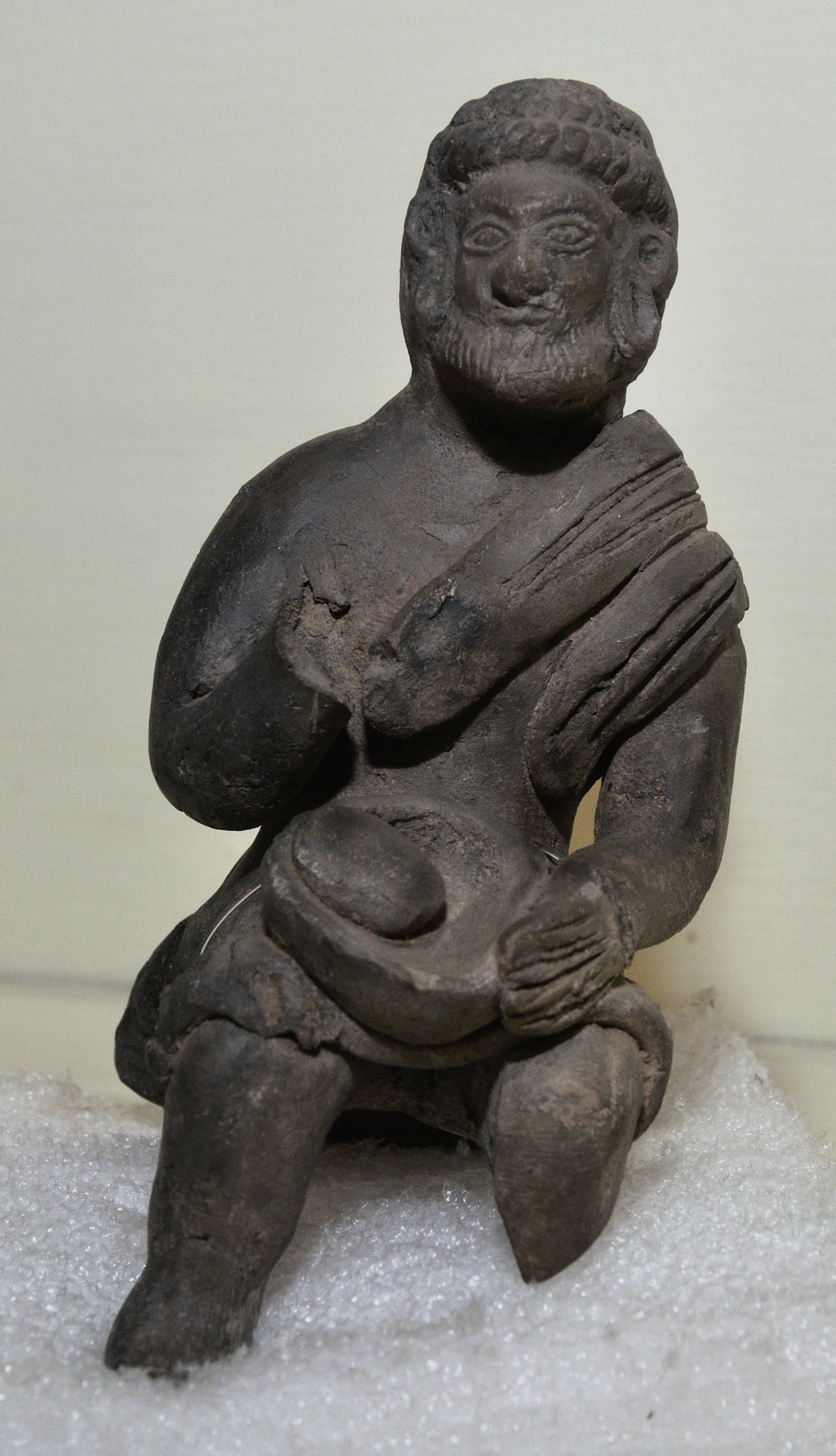
"Ethnic head", Mathura, c. 2nd century BCE. Mathura Museum.

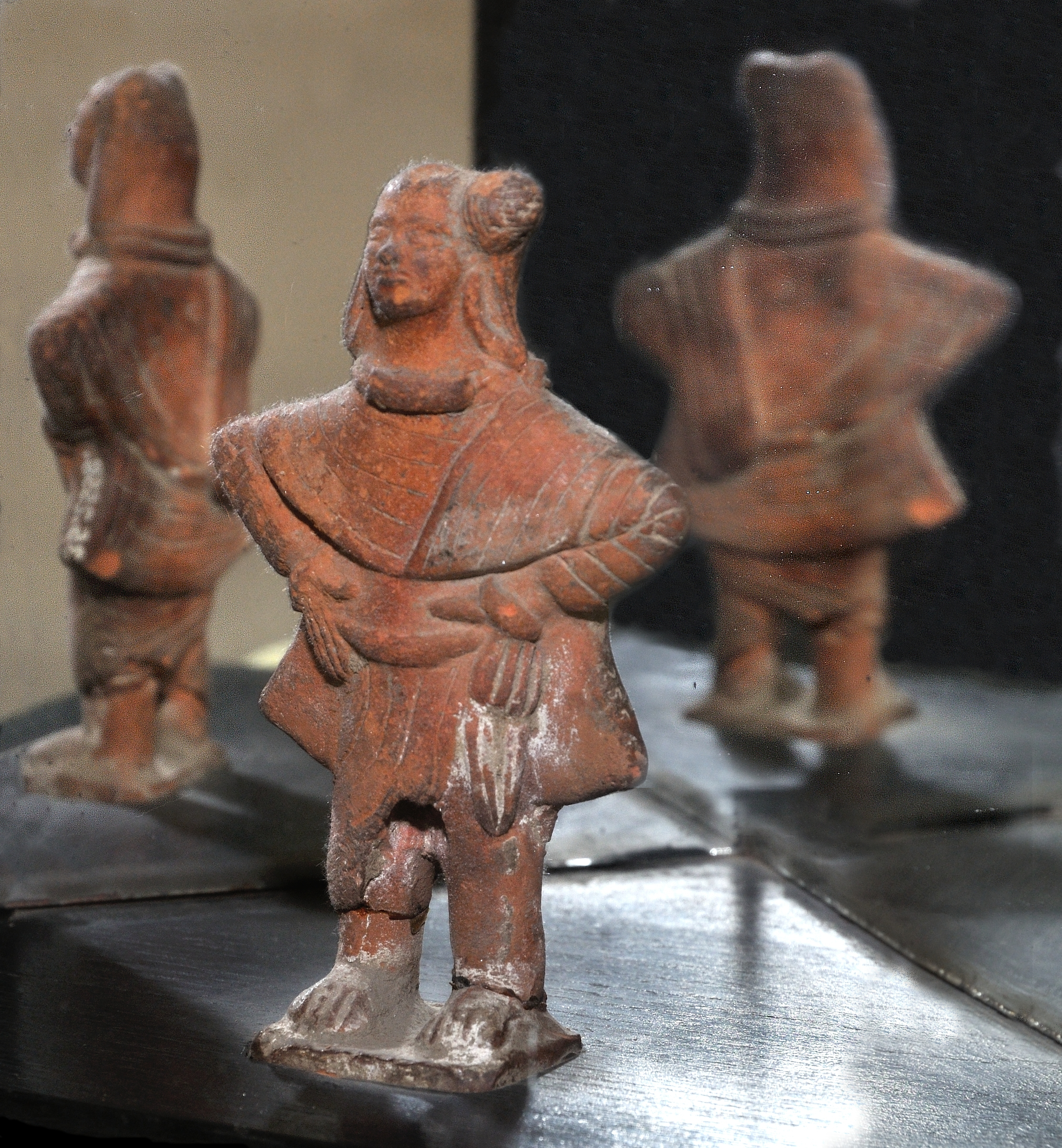
"Persian Nobleman clad in coat dupatta trouser and turban", Mathura, c. 2nd Century BCE. Mathura Museum.

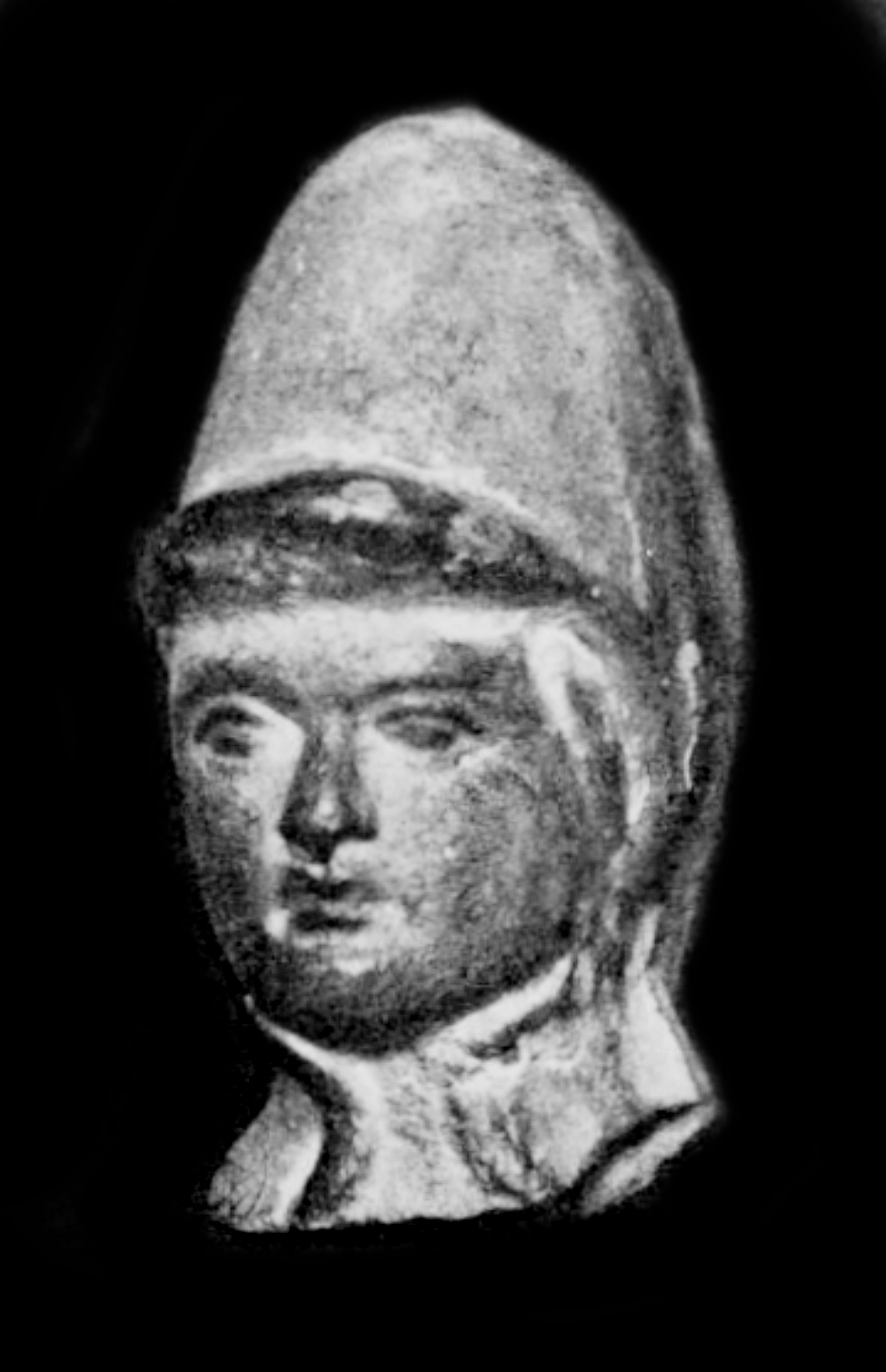
Figure of a foreigner, from Sarnath

Some relatively high quality terracotta statuettes have been recovered from the Mauryan Empire strata in the excavations of Mathura in northern India. Most of these terracottas show what appears to be female deities or mother goddesses. However, several figures of foreigners also appear in the terracottas from the 4th to the 2nd century BCE, which are either described simply as "foreigners" or Persian or Iranian because of their foreign features. These figurines might reflect the increased contacts of Indians with Iranian people during this period. Several of these seem to represent foreign soldiers who visited India during the Mauryan period and influenced modellers in Mathura with their peculiar ethnic features and uniforms. One of the terracotta statuettes, a man nicknamed the "Persian nobleman" and dated to the 2nd century BCE, can be seen wearing a coat, scarf, trousers and a turban.

=== Religion ===
According to Ammianus Marcellinus, a 4th-century CE Roman author, Hystaspes, the father of Darius I, studied under the Brahmanas in India, thus contributing to the development of the religion of the Magi (Zoroastrianism):

Hystaspes, a very wise monarch, the father of Darius. Who while boldly penetrating into the remoter districts of upper India, came to a certain woody retreat, of which with its tranquil silence the Brahmans, men of sublime genius, were the possessors. From their teaching he learnt the principles of the motion of the world and of the stars, and the pure rites of sacrifice, as far as he could; and of what he learnt he infused some portion into the minds of the Magi, which they have handed down by tradition to later ages, each instructing his own children, and adding to it their own system of divination.

— Ammianus Marcellinus, XXIII. 6.

In ancient sources, Hystapes is sometimes considered as identical with Vishtaspa (the Avestan and Old Persian name for Hystapes), an early patron of Zoroaster.

According to Christopher I. Beckwith, commenting on the content of the Edicts of Ashoka, the early Buddhist concepts of karma, rebirth, and affirming that good deeds will be rewarded in this life and the next, in Heaven, probably find their origin in Achaemenid Mazdaism, which had been introduced in India from the time of the Achaemenid conquest of Gandara.

Beckwith's methodologies and interpretations concerning early Buddhism, inscriptions, and archaeological sites have been criticized by other scholars, such as Johannes Bronkhorst, Osmund Bopearachchi, Stephen Batchelor and Charles Goodman. According to Patrick Olivelle, Beckwith's theory about Ashoka is "an outlier and no mainstream Ashokan scholar would subscribe to that view."

== List of satrapies ==
- Gandāra — Gandhara and Paropamisadae;
- Hindush — lower and middle Indus Valley;
- Sattagydia — Bannu Basin and possibly Punjab;
- Arachosia — parts lying upto Indus River;
- Gedrosia or Maka — Makran and/or Oman.

== See also ==
- India (Herodotus)
- Persian Immortals
- Iranic peoples
- Persian language in South Asia
- Parsis
- Iran-Pakistan relations

== Bibliography ==
- Archibald, Zosia; Davies, John K.; Gabrielsen, Vincent (2011), The Economies of Hellenistic Societies, Third to First Centuries BC, Oxford University Press, ISBN 9780199587926
- Alram, Michael (2016), "The Coinage of the Persian Empire", in William E. Metcalf (ed.), The Oxford Handbook of Greek and Roman Coinage, Oxford University Press, pp. 61–, ISBN 9780199372188
- Boardman, John (1998), "Reflections on the Origins of Indian Stone Architecture", Bulletin of the Asia Institute, pp. 15–19, 1998, New Series, Vol. 12, (Alexander's Legacy in the East: Studies in Honor of Paul Bernard), p. 13-22, JSTOR
- Bopearachchi, Osmund (2000), "Coin Production and Circulation in Central Asia and North-West India (Before and after Alexander's Conquest)", Indologica Taurinensia, 25, International Association of Sanskrit Studies
- Bopearachchi, Osmund (2017), "Achaemenids and Mauryans: Emergence of Coins and Plastic Arts in India", in Alka Patel; Touraj Daryaee (eds.), India and Iran in the Longue Durée, UCI Jordan Center for Persian Studies, pp. 15–48
- Bopearachchi, Osmund; Cribb, Joe (1992), "Coins illustrating the History of the Crossroads of Asia", in Errington, Elizabeth; Cribb, Joe; Claringbull, Maggie (eds.), The Crossroads of Asia: transformation in image and symbol in the art of ancient Afghanistan and Pakistan, Ancient India and Iran Trust, pp. 56–59, ISBN 978-0-9518399-1-1
- Cribb, Joe (1983), "Investigating the introduction of coinage in India - A review of recent research", Journal of the Numismatic Society of India: 80–101
- Dandamaev, M. A. (1989), A Political History of the Achaemenid Empire, BRILL, ISBN 978-90-04-09172-6
- Eggermont, Pierre Herman Leonard (1975), Alexander's Campaigns in Sind and Baluchistan and the Siege of the Brahmin Town of Harmatelia, Peeters Publishers, ISBN 978-90-6186-037-2
- Harle, J.C., The Art and Architecture of the Indian Subcontinent, 2nd edn. 1994, Yale University Press Pelican History of Art, ISBN 0300062176
- Magee, Peter; Petrie, Cameron; Knox, Richard; Khan, Farid; Thomas, Ken (2005), "The Achaemenid Empire in South Asia and Recent Excavations in Akra in Northwest Pakistan", American Journal of Archaeology, 109 (4): 711–741, doi:10.3764/aja.109.4.711, S2CID 54089753
- Mitchiner, Michael (1978), The Ancient & Classical World, 600 B.C.-A.D. 650, Hawkins Publications; distributed by B. A. Seaby, ISBN 9780904173161
- Neelis, Jason (2010), Early Buddhist Transmission and Trade Networks: Mobility and Exchange Within and Beyond the Northwestern Borderlands of South Asia, BRILL, ISBN 978-90-04-18159-5
- Olmstead, A. T. (1948), History of the Persian Empire, University of Chicago Press, ISBN 978-0-226-62777-9
- Sen, Sailendra Nath (1999). Ancient Indian History and Civilization. New Age International. ISBN 9788122411980.
