= Sittace =

Sittace or Sittake or Sittakê (Greek: Σιττάκη, Ptol. vi. 1. § 6; Akkadian Sattagū), was the capital of ancient Sittacene in Assyria.

== History ==
Sittace was located at the southern end of the province, on the road between Artemita and Susa. (Strabo xvi. p. 744.) It was called Sitta (Σίττα) by Diodorus (xvii. 110). William Smith believed that Diodorus's Sambana also referred to Sittace.

The origin of the city's name may be found in Babylonian tablets referring to the polity "URU.Sattagû" which may be a translation or approximation of "people of Sattagydia", a Persian satrapy.

The district of Sittacene appears to have been called in later times "Apolloniatis" (Strab. xi. p. 524).
