= Sambana =

Sambana (Greek: Σάμβανα), is an ancient town mentioned by Diodorus Siculus (xvii. 27). William Smith identifies it as the same as the Sabata mentioned by Pliny (vi. 27. § 31). It was situated about two days' journey north of Sittace and east of Artemita, in Assyria.
