= DNa inscription =

Ancient inscription on Darius I's tomb in Iran

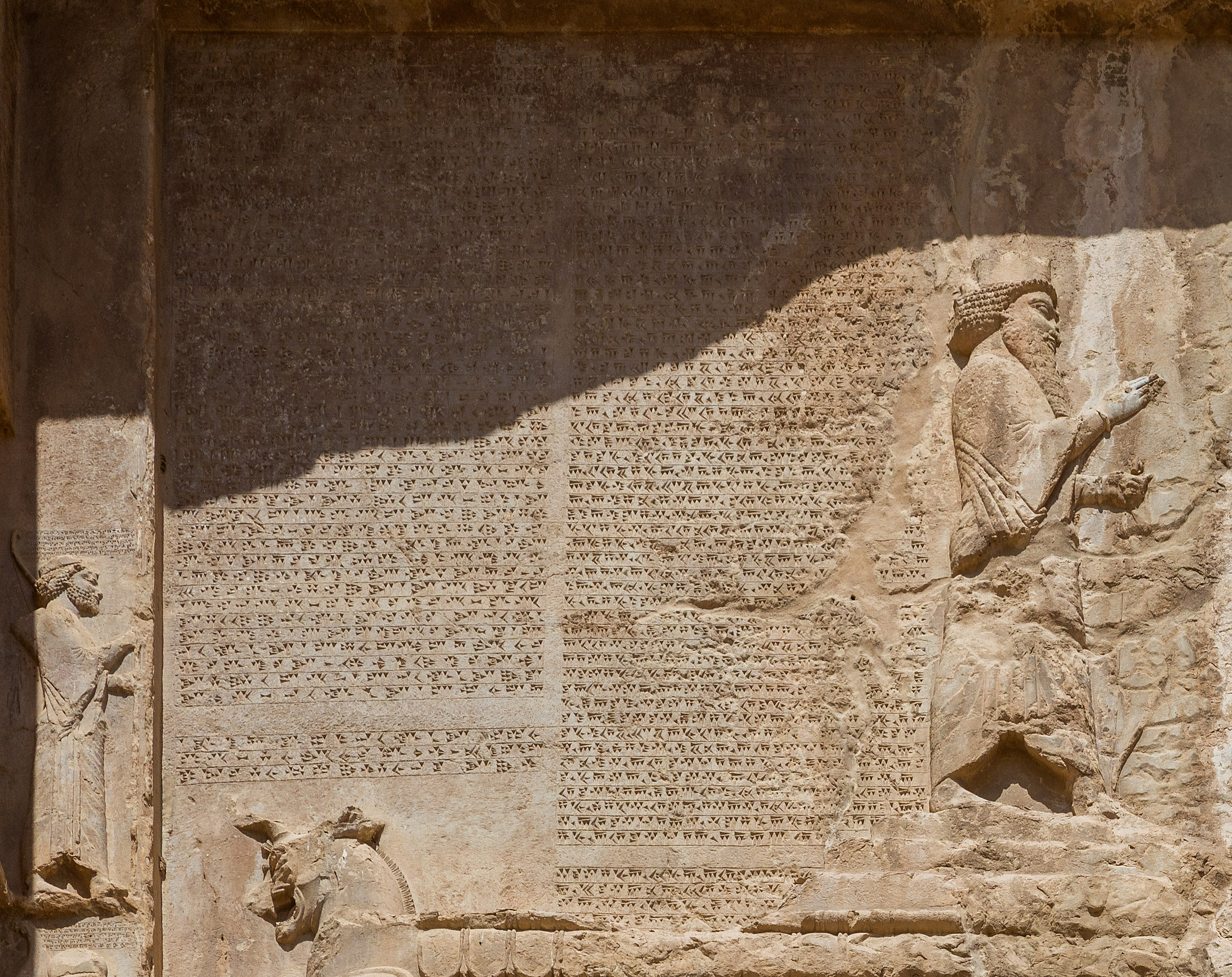
A photograph of the DNa inscription at Naqshe Rostam, 2018

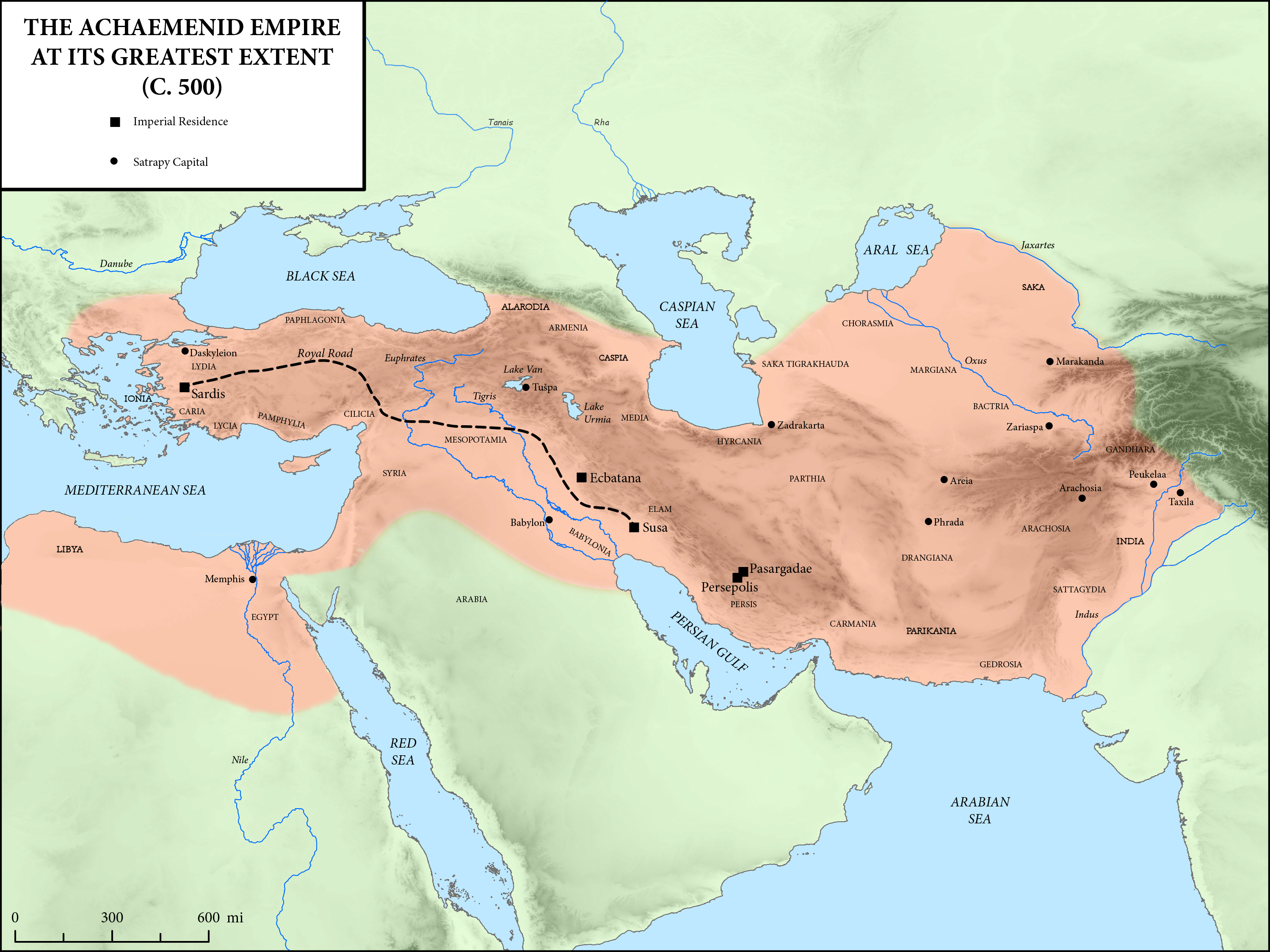
The Achaemenid Persian Empire at its greatest extent, c. 500 BCE

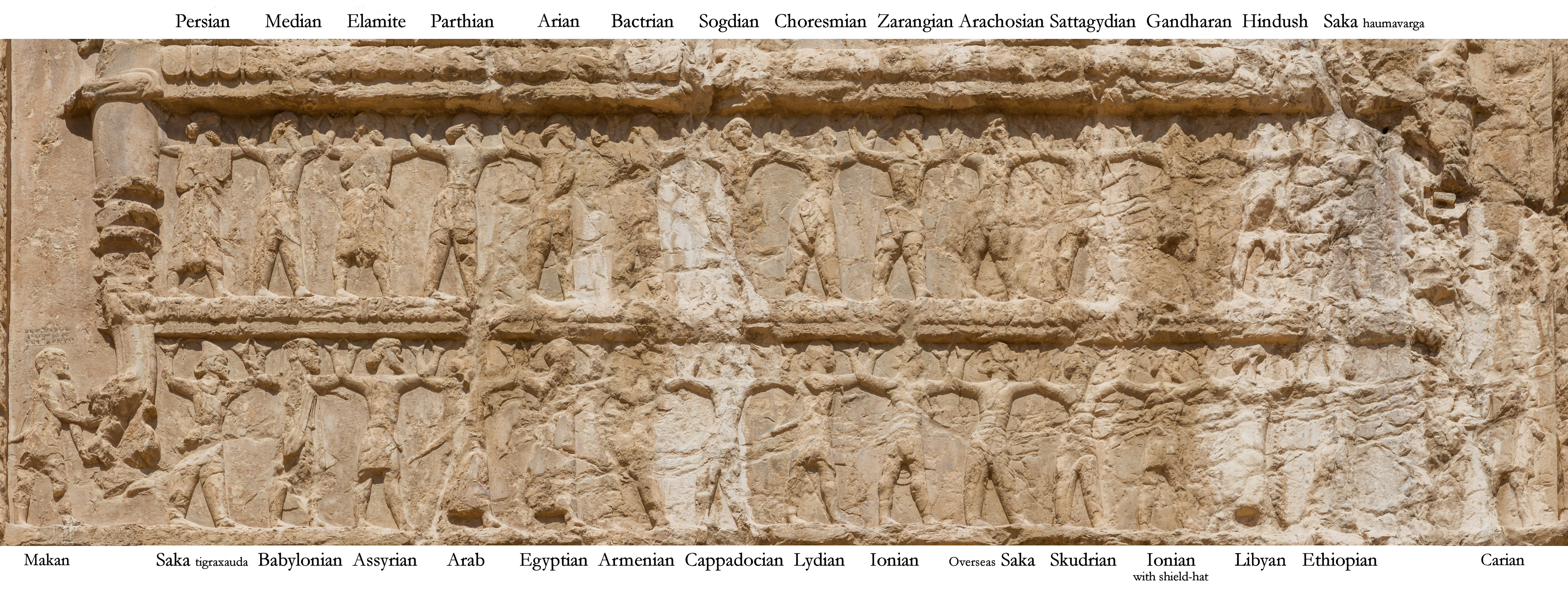
The nationalities mentioned in the DNa inscription are also depicted on the upper register of the tomb of Darius I, as on all the dynastic tombs at Naqsh-e Rustam and Persepolis.

The DNa inscription (abbreviation for Darius Naqsh-e Rostam inscription "a") is a famous Achaemenid royal inscription located in Naqsh-e Rostam, Iran. It dates to c. 490 BCE, the time of Darius the Great, and appears in the top-left corner of the façade of his tomb.

== Content ==
The inscription mentions the conquests of Darius the Great and his various achievements during his life. Its exact date is not known, but it can be assumed to be from the last decade of his reign.

Like several other inscriptions by Darius, the territories controlled by the Achaemenid Empire are clearly listed.

The nationalities mentioned in the DNa inscription are otherwise vividly illustrated through the large sculptural relief on the upper registers of all the tombs, including that of Darius I, at Naqsh-e Rostam. One of the best preserved is that of Xerxes I.

== Script ==
The inscription is written in the Old Persian cuneiform, a nearly alphabetical, simple form of the ancient cuneiform scripts (36 phonetic characters and 8 logograms), which was specially designed and used by the early Achaemenid rulers from the 6th century BCE.

		k-	x-	g-	c-	ç-	j-	t-	θ-	d-	p-	f-	b-	n-	m-	y-	v-	r-	l-	s-	z-	š-	h-
-(a)	𐎠	𐎣	𐎧	𐎥	𐎨	𐏂	𐎩	𐎫	𐎰	𐎭	𐎱	𐎳	𐎲	𐎴	𐎶	𐎹	𐎺	𐎼	𐎾	𐎿	𐏀	𐏁	𐏃
-i	𐎡	—	𐎧	—	𐎨	𐏂	𐎪	𐎫	𐎰	𐎮	𐎱	𐎳	𐎲	𐎴	𐎷	𐎹	𐎻	𐎼	𐎾	𐎿	𐏀	𐏁	𐏃
-u	𐎢	𐎤	𐎧	𐎦	𐎨	𐏂	—	𐎬	𐎰	𐎯	𐎱	𐎳	𐎲	𐎵	𐎸	𐎹	—	𐎽	𐎾	𐎿	𐏀	𐏁	𐏃

== Full inscription ==
The full inscriptions consists in two parts, the first one being related to a description of the lineage of Darius, as well as a list of the countries under his rule. The second part is more religious in nature and related to the cult of Ahuramazda.

Darius I Naqsh I Rustam inscription (DNa inscription)
English translation (Part I)	Transliteration	Original
(1) A great god is Ahuramazda, who created this earth, who created yonder sky, who created man, who created happiness for man, who made Darius king, one king of many, one lord of many. I am Darius the great king, king of kings, king of countries containing all kinds of men, king in this great earth far and wide, son of Hystaspes, an Achaemenid, a Persian, son of a Persian, an Aryan, having Aryan lineage. (15) King Darius says: By the favor of Ahuramazda these are the countries which I seized outside of Persia; I ruled over them; they bore tribute to me; they did what was said to them by me; they held my law firmly; Media, Elam, Parthia, Aria, (23) Bactria, Sogdia, Chorasmia, (24) Drangiana, Arachosia, Sattagydia, Gandāra [Gadāra], (25-26) India [Hiduš], the haoma-drinking Scythians, the Scythians with pointed caps, Babylonia, Assyria, (27) Arabia, Egypt, Armenia, (28) Cappadocia, Lydia, the Greeks (Yauna), the Scythians across the sea (Sakâ), (29) Thrace, the petasos-wearing Greeks [Yaunâ], the Libyans, (30) the Nubians, the men of Maka and the Carians. — DNa inscription of Darius I.	1. baga vazraka Auramazdā hya imām 2. būmim adā hya avam asmānam 3. adā hya martiyam adā hya 4. šiyātim adā martiyahyā 5. hya Dārayavaum xšāyaθiyam akunauš 6. aivam parūvnām xšāyaθiyam 7. aivam parūvnām framātāram 8. adam Dārayavauš xšāyaθiya vazraka 9. xšāyaθiya xšāyaθiyānām 10. xšāyaθiya dahyūnām vispazanānām 11. xšāyaθiya ahyāyā būmiyā 12. vazrakāyā dūraiy apiy Vištāspahyā; 13. puça Haxāmanišiya Pārsa Pārsahyā; 14. puça Ariya Ariya ciça 15. θātiy Dārayavauš xšāyaθiya 16. vašnā Auramazdāhā imā 17. dahyāva tyā adam agarbāyam 18. apataram hacā Pārsā adamšām : 19. patiyaxšayaiy manā bājim abaraha 20. tyašām hacāma aθahya ava akunava 21. dātam tya manā avadiš 22. adāraiya Māda Ūvja Parθava Haraiva; 23. Bāxtriš Suguda Uvārazmiš; 24. Zraka Harauvatiš Θataguš Gadāra; 25. Hiduš Sakā haumavargā Sakā; 26. tigraxaudā Bābirauš Aθurā; 27. Arabāya Mudrāya Armina; 28. Katpatuka Sparda Yauna Sakā tyaiy paradraya 29. Skudra Yaunā takabarā Putāyā; 30. Kūšiyā Maciyā Karkā.	DNa inscription part I: 1. 𐎲𐎥 𐏐 𐎺𐏀𐎼𐎣 𐏐 𐎠𐎢𐎼𐎶𐏀𐎭𐎠 𐏐 𐏃𐎹 𐏐 𐎡𐎶/𐎠𐎶; 2. 𐏐 𐎲𐎢𐎷𐎡𐎶 𐏐 𐎠𐎭𐎠 𐏐 𐏃𐎹 𐏐 𐎠𐎺𐎶 𐏐 𐎠𐎿𐎶/𐎠𐎴𐎶; 3. 𐏐 𐎠𐎭𐎠 𐏐 𐏃𐎹 𐏐 𐎶𐎼𐎫𐎡𐎹𐎶 𐏐 𐎠𐎭𐎠 𐏐 𐏃/𐎹; 4. 𐏐 𐏁𐎡𐎹𐎠𐎫𐎡𐎶 𐏐 𐎠𐎭𐎠 𐏐 𐎶𐎼𐎫𐎡𐎹𐏃𐎹𐎠; 5. 𐏐 𐏃𐎹 𐏐 𐎭𐎠𐎼𐎹𐎺𐎢𐎶 𐏐 𐎧𐏁𐎠𐎹𐎰𐎡𐎹𐎶 𐏐 𐎠𐎤/𐎢𐎴𐎢𐏁; 6. 𐏐 𐎠𐎡𐎺𐎶 𐏐 𐎱𐎽𐎢𐎺𐎴𐎠𐎶 𐏐 𐎧𐏁𐎠𐎹𐎰/𐎡𐎹𐎶; 7. 𐏐 𐎠𐎡𐎺𐎶 𐏐 𐎱𐎽𐎢𐎺𐎴𐎠𐎶 𐏐 𐎳𐎼𐎶𐎠𐎫𐎠/𐎼𐎶; 8. 𐏐 𐎠𐎭𐎶 𐏐 𐎭𐎠𐎼𐎹𐎺𐎢𐏁 𐏐 𐎧𐏁𐎠𐎹𐎰𐎡𐎹 𐏐 𐎺/𐏀𐎼𐎣; 9. 𐏐 𐎧𐏁𐎠𐎹𐎰𐎡𐎹 𐏐 𐎧𐏁𐎠𐎹𐎰𐎡𐎹𐎠𐎴𐎠𐎶; 10. 𐏐 𐎧𐏁𐎠𐎹𐎰𐎡𐎹 𐏐 𐎭𐏃𐎹𐎢𐎴𐎠𐎶 𐏐 𐎻𐎡𐎿𐎱𐏀𐎴𐎠/𐎴𐎠𐎶; 11. 𐏐 𐎧𐏁𐎠𐎹𐎰𐎡𐎹 𐏐 𐎠𐏃𐎹𐎠𐎹𐎠 𐏐 𐎲𐎢𐎷𐎡/𐎹𐎠; 12. 𐏐 𐎺𐏀𐎼𐎣𐎠𐎹𐎠 𐏐 𐎯𐎢𐎼𐎡<𐎹 𐏐> 𐎠𐎱𐎡𐎹 𐏐 𐎻𐎡𐏁𐎫𐎠𐎿/𐎱𐏃𐎹𐎠; 13. 𐏐 𐎱𐎢𐏂 𐏐 𐏃𐎧𐎠𐎶𐎴𐎡𐏁𐎡𐎹 𐏐 𐎱𐎠𐎼𐎿 𐏐 𐎱/𐎠𐎼𐎿𐏃𐎹𐎠; 14. 𐏐 𐎱𐎢𐏂 𐏐 𐎠𐎼𐎡𐎹 𐏐 𐎠𐎼𐎡𐎹 𐏐 𐎨𐎡/𐏂; 15. 𐏐 𐎰𐎠𐎫𐎡𐎹 𐏐 𐎭𐎠𐎼𐎹𐎺𐎢𐏁 𐏐 𐎧𐏁[𐎠]𐎹/𐎰𐎡𐎹; 16. 𐏐 𐎺𐏁𐎴𐎠 𐏐 𐎠𐎢𐎼𐎶𐏀𐎭𐎠𐏃𐎠 𐏐 𐎡𐎶[𐎠 𐏐]; 17. 𐎭𐏃𐎹𐎠𐎺 𐏐 𐎫𐎹𐎠 𐏐 𐎠𐎭𐎶 𐏐 𐎠𐎥𐎼𐎲𐎠𐎹[𐎶 𐏐]; 18. 𐎠𐎱𐎫𐎼𐎶 𐏐 𐏃𐎨𐎠 𐏐 𐎱𐎠𐎼𐎿𐎠 𐏐 𐎠𐎭𐎶𐏁𐎠[𐎶 𐏐]; 19. 𐎱𐎫𐎡𐎹𐎧𐏁𐎹𐎡𐎹 𐏐 𐎶𐎴𐎠 𐏐 𐎲𐎠𐎪𐎡𐎶 𐏐 𐎠𐎲[𐎼]/𐏃; 20. 𐏐 𐎫𐎹𐏁𐎠𐎶 𐏐 𐏃𐎨𐎠𐎶 𐏐 𐎠𐎰𐏃𐎹 𐏐 𐎠𐎺 𐏐 [𐎠]/𐎤𐎢𐎴𐎺; 21. 𐏐 𐎭𐎠𐎫𐎶 𐏐 𐎫𐎹 𐏐 𐎶𐎴𐎠 𐏐 𐎠𐎺𐎮𐎡[𐏁 𐏐]; 22. 𐎠𐎭𐎠𐎼𐎡𐎹 𐏐 𐎶𐎠𐎭 𐏐 𐎢𐎺𐎩 𐏐 𐎱𐎼𐎰𐎺 𐏐 𐏃𐎼[𐎡]/𐎺; 23. 𐏐 𐎲𐎠𐎧𐎫𐎼𐎡𐏁 𐏐 𐎿𐎢𐎦𐎢𐎭 𐏐 𐎢𐎺𐎠𐎼𐏀[𐎷]/𐎡𐏁; 24. 𐏐 𐏀𐎼𐎣 𐏐 𐏃𐎼𐎢𐎺𐎫𐎡𐏁 𐏐 𐎰𐎫𐎦𐎢𐏁 𐏐 𐎥/𐎭𐎠𐎼; 25. 𐏐 𐏃𐎡𐎯𐎢𐏁 𐏐 𐎿𐎣𐎠 𐏐 𐏃𐎢𐎶𐎺𐎼𐎥𐎠 𐏐 𐎿/𐎣𐎠; 26. 𐏐 𐎫𐎡𐎥𐎼𐎧𐎢𐎭𐎠 𐏐 𐎲𐎠𐎲𐎡𐎽𐎢[𐏁 𐏐] 𐎠/𐎰𐎢𐎼𐎠; 27. 𐏐 𐎠𐎼𐎲𐎠𐎹 𐏐 𐎸𐎢𐎭𐎼𐎠𐎹 𐏐 𐎠𐎼𐎷[𐎡𐎴]; 28. 𐏐 𐎣𐎫𐎱𐎬𐎢𐎣 𐏐 𐎿𐎱𐎼𐎭 𐏐 𐎹𐎢𐎴 𐏐 𐎿𐎣𐎠 𐏐 𐎫𐎹𐎡[𐎹 𐏐 𐎱]/𐎼𐎭𐎼𐎹; 29. 𐏐 𐎿𐎤𐎢𐎭𐎼 𐏐 𐎹𐎢𐎴𐎠 𐏐 𐎫𐎣𐎲𐎼𐎠 𐏐 𐎱𐎢𐎫[𐎠]𐎹/𐎠; 30. 𐏐 𐎤𐎢𐏁𐎡𐎹𐎠 𐏐 𐎶𐎨𐎡𐎹𐎠 𐏐 𐎣𐎼𐎣𐎠 𐏐
English translation (Part II)	Transliteration	Original
(1) King Darius says: Ahuramazda, when he saw this earth in commotion, thereafter bestowed it upon me, made me king; I am king. By the favor of Ahuramazda I put it down in its place; what I said to them, that they did, as was my desire. If now you shall think that "How many are the countries which King Darius held?" look at the sculptures [of those] who bear the throne, then shall you know, then shall it become known to you: the spear of a Persian man has gone forth far; then shall it become known to you: a Persian man has delivered battle far indeed from Persia. (18) Darius the King says: This which has been done, all that by the will of Ahuramazda I did. Ahuramazda bore me aid, until I did the work. May Ahuramazda protect me from harm, and my royal house, and this land: this I pray of Ahuramazda, this may Ahuramazda give to me! O man, that which is the command of Ahuramazda, let this not seem repugnant to you; do not leave the right path; do not rise in rebellion! — DNa inscription of Darius I.	1. θātiy Dārayavauš; 2. xšāyaθiya Auramazdā yaθā 3. avaina : imām : būmim : yaudatim : 4. pasāvadim : manā : frābara : mām : xšāyaθiyam 5. akunauš adam xšāyaθiya 6. amiy vašnā Auramazdāhā adamšim 7. gāθavā niyašādayam tyašām 8. adam aθaham ava akunava yaθā mām 9. kāma āha yadipatiy maniyāhaiy tya 10. ciyakaram āha avā dahyāva 11. tyā Dārayavauš xšāyaθiya 12. adāraya patikarā dīdiy tyaiy gāθum 13. baratiy avadā xšnāsāhy : 14. adataiy azdā bavātiy Pārsahyā; 15. martiyahyā dūraiy arštiš parāgmatā 16. adataiy azdā bavātiy 17. Pārsa martiya dūrayapiy hacā Pārsā; 18. partaram patiyajatā θātiy Dārayavauš; 19. xšāyaθiya aita tya kartam 20. ava visam vašnā Auramazdāhā akunavam 21. Auramazdāmaiy upastām abara 22. yātā kartam akunavam mām Auramazdā; 23. pātuv hacā gastā utāmaiy 24. viθam utā imām dahyāum aita adam 25. Auramazdām jadiyāmiy aitamaiya 26. Auramazdā dadātuv 27. martiyā hyā Auramazdāhā; 28. framānā hauvtaiy gastā 29. mā θadaya paθim 30. tyām rāstām mā 31. avarada mā stabava	DNa inscription part II: 1. (last part of line) 𐎰𐎠𐎫𐎡𐎹 𐏐 𐎭 2. 𐎠𐎼𐎹𐎺𐎢𐏁𐏐 𐎧𐏁𐎠𐎹𐎰𐎡𐎹 𐏐 𐎠𐎢𐎼𐎶𐏀𐎭𐎠 [𐏐 𐎹]𐎰/𐎠; 3. 𐏐 𐎠𐎺𐎡𐎴 𐏐 𐎡𐎶𐎠𐎶 𐏐 𐎲𐎢𐎷𐎡𐎶 𐏐 𐎹𐎢[𐎭𐎫𐎡𐎶 𐏐]; 4. 𐎱𐎿𐎠𐎺𐎮𐎡𐎶 𐏐 𐎶𐎴𐎠 𐏐 𐎳𐎼𐎠𐎲𐎼 𐏐 𐎶𐎠𐎶 [𐏐 𐎧𐏁𐎠/𐎹𐎰𐎡𐎹𐎶; 5. 𐏐 𐎠𐎤𐎢𐎴𐎢𐏁 𐏐 𐎠𐎭𐎶 𐏐 𐎧𐏁𐎠[𐎹𐎰]𐎡𐎹; 6. 𐏐 𐎠𐎷𐎡𐎹 𐏐 𐎺𐏁𐎴𐎠 𐏐 𐎠𐎢𐎼𐎶𐏀𐎭𐎠𐏃[𐎠] 𐏐 𐎠/𐎭𐎶𐏁𐎡𐎶; 7. 𐏐 𐎥𐎠𐎰𐎺𐎠 𐏐 𐎴𐎡𐎹𐏁𐎠𐎭𐎹𐎶 [𐏐 𐎫𐎹]𐏁𐎠/𐎶; 8. 𐏐 𐎠𐎭𐎶 𐏐 𐎠𐎰𐏃𐎶 𐏐 𐎠𐎺 𐏐 𐎠𐎤𐎢𐎴𐎺 𐏐 𐎹[𐎰𐎠 𐏐] 𐎶𐎠𐎶 𐏐; 9. 𐎣𐎠𐎶 𐏐 𐎠𐏃 𐏐 𐎹𐎮𐎡𐎱𐎫𐎡𐎹 𐏐 𐎶𐎴𐎡𐎹[𐎠𐏃𐎡𐎹 𐏐 𐎫]/𐎹; 10. 𐏐 𐎨𐎡𐎹𐎣𐎼𐎶 𐏐 [𐎠𐏃 𐏐 𐎠]𐎺𐎠 𐏐 𐎭𐏃𐎹𐎠𐎺; 11. 𐏐 𐎫𐎹𐎠 𐏐 𐎭𐎠𐎼𐎹[𐎺]𐎢𐏁 𐏐 𐎧𐏁𐎠𐎹[𐎰]𐎡𐎹; 12. 𐏐 𐎠𐎭𐎠𐎼𐎹 𐏐 𐎱𐎫𐎡𐎣𐎼𐎠 𐏐 𐎮𐎡𐎮𐎡𐎹 𐏐 𐎫𐎹𐎡[𐎹] 𐏐 𐎥/𐎠𐎰𐎢𐎶; 13. 𐏐 𐎲𐎼𐎫𐎡𐎹 𐏐 𐎠[𐎺]𐎭𐎠 𐏐 𐎧𐏁𐎴𐎠𐎿𐎠𐏃𐎹 𐏐; 14. 𐎠𐎭𐎫𐎡𐎹 𐏐 𐎠𐏀𐎭𐎠 𐏐 𐎲𐎺𐎠[𐎫]𐎡𐎹 𐏐 𐎱𐎠𐎼[𐎿]𐏃[𐎹𐎠 𐏐]; 15. 𐎶𐎼𐎫𐎡𐎹𐏃𐎹𐎠 𐏐 𐎯𐎢𐎼𐎡𐎹 𐏐 𐎠𐎼𐏁𐎫[𐎡]𐏁 𐏐 𐎱/𐎼𐎠𐎥𐎶𐎫𐎠; 16. 𐏐 𐎠𐎭𐎫𐎡𐎹 𐏐 𐎠𐏀𐎭𐎠 𐏐 𐎲𐎺𐎠𐎫𐎡/𐎹; 17. 𐏐 𐎱𐎠𐎼𐎿 𐏐 𐎶𐎼𐎫𐎡𐎹 𐏐 𐎯𐎢𐎼𐎹𐎱𐎡𐎹 [𐏐 𐏃𐎨]𐎠 𐏐 𐎱𐎠/𐎼𐎿𐎠; 18. 𐏐 𐎱𐎼𐎫𐎼𐎶 𐏐 𐎱𐎫𐎡𐎹𐎩𐎫𐎠 𐏐 𐎰𐎠𐎫𐎡𐎹 𐏐 𐎭𐎠/𐎼𐎹𐎺𐎢𐏁; 19. 𐏐 𐎧𐏁𐎠𐎹𐎰𐎡𐎹 𐏐 𐎠𐎡𐎫 𐏐 𐎫[𐎹 𐏐] 𐎣𐎼𐎫/𐎶; 20. 𐏐 𐎠𐎺 𐏐 𐎻𐎡𐎿𐎶 𐏐 𐎺𐏁𐎴𐎠 𐏐 𐎠𐎢𐎼𐎶𐏀𐎭𐎠𐏃𐎠 𐏐 𐎠𐎤/𐎢𐎴𐎺𐎶; 21. 𐏐 𐎠𐎢𐎼𐎶𐏀𐎭𐎠<𐎶>𐎡𐎹 𐏐 𐎢𐎱𐎿𐎫𐎠𐎶 𐏐 𐎠𐎲/𐎼; 22. 𐏐 𐎹𐎠𐎫𐎠 𐏐 𐎣𐎼𐎫𐎶 𐏐 𐎠𐎤𐎢𐎴[𐎺𐎶 𐏐 𐎶𐎠]𐎶 𐏐 𐎠/𐎢𐎼𐎶𐏀𐎭𐎠; 23. 𐏐 𐎱𐎠𐎬𐎢𐎺 𐏐 𐏃𐎨𐎠 𐏐 𐎥[𐎿𐎫𐎠] 𐏐 𐎢𐎫𐎠𐎶/𐎡𐎹; 24. 𐏐 𐎻𐎡𐎰𐎶 𐏐 𐎢𐎫𐎠 𐏐 𐎡𐎶𐎠𐎶 𐏐 𐎭𐏃𐎹𐎠𐎢𐎶 𐏐 𐎠𐎡𐎫 𐏐 𐎠𐎭/𐎶; 25. 𐏐 𐎠𐎢𐎼𐎶𐏀𐎭𐎠𐎶 𐏐 𐎩𐎮𐎡𐎹𐎠𐎷𐎡𐎹 𐏐 𐎠𐎡𐎫𐎶/𐎡𐎹; 26. 𐏐 𐎠𐎢𐎼𐎶𐏀𐎭𐎠 𐏐 𐎭𐎭𐎠𐎬𐎢𐎺 𐏐; 27. 𐎶𐎼𐎫𐎡𐎹𐎠 𐏐 𐏃𐎹𐎠 𐏐 𐎠𐎢𐎼𐎶𐏀𐎭𐎠𐏃/𐎠; 28. 𐏐 𐎳𐎼𐎶𐎠𐎴𐎠 𐏐 𐏃𐎢𐎺𐎫𐎡𐎹 𐏐 𐎥𐎿/𐎫𐎠; 29. 𐏐 𐎶𐎠 𐏐 𐎰𐎭𐎹 𐏐 𐎱𐎰𐎡𐎶 𐏐; 30. 𐎫𐎹𐎠𐎶 𐏐 𐎼𐎠𐎿𐎫𐎠𐎶 𐏐 𐎶𐎠; 31. 𐏐 𐎠𐎺𐎼𐎭 𐏐 𐎶𐎠 𐏐 𐎿𐎫𐎲𐎺

== Specific country names ==
The DNa inscription records the various territories under the rule of Darius I.

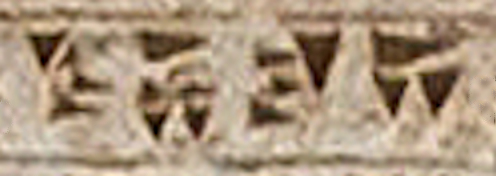
The name for Lydia: Sparda (𐎿𐎱𐎼𐎭).

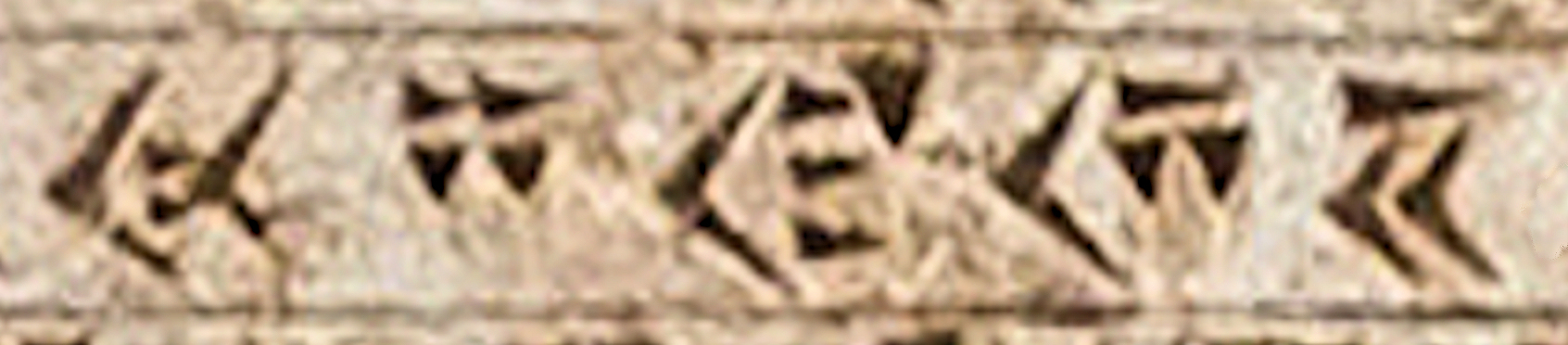
The name for India: Hidūš (𐏃𐎡𐎯𐎢𐏁 in Old Persian cuneiform) in the DNa inscription.

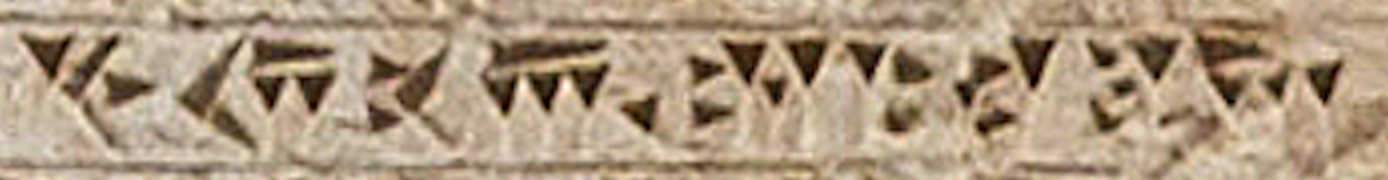
The presumed name for Ancient Macedonians: 𐎹𐎢𐎴𐎠𐏐𐎫𐎣𐎲𐎼𐎠, Yaunā takabarā, "Ionians with shield-hats", referring to the petasos or kausia.

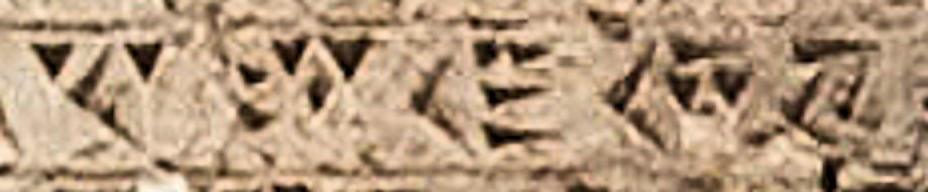
The name for Sattagydia (𐎰𐎫𐎦𐎢𐏁, Thataguš) in the DNa inscription.

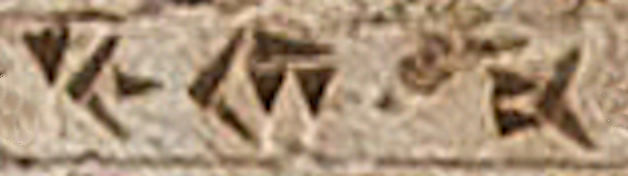
The name for Ionian Greeks: Yauna (𐎹𐎢𐎴)

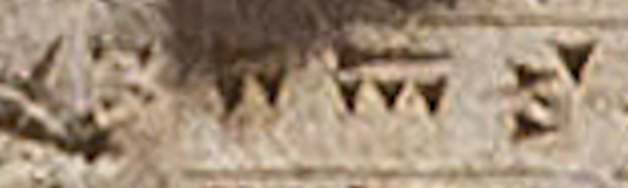
The name Gadāra (𐎥𐎭𐎠𐎼 in Old Persian cuneiform) in the DNa inscription.

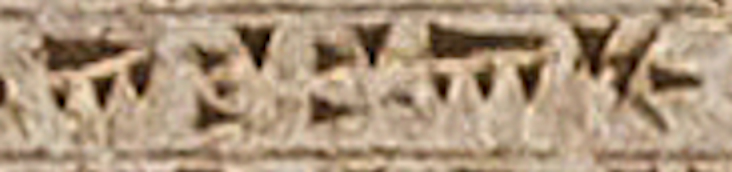
The name for Arabia: Arabāya (𐎠𐎼𐎲𐎠𐎹)

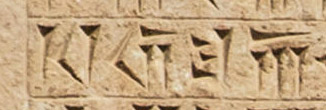
The name for Assyria: Ā/thūrā (𐎠/𐎰𐎢𐎼𐎠)
