= Tomb of Darius the Great =

Achaemenid tomb at Naqsh-e Rostam, Iran

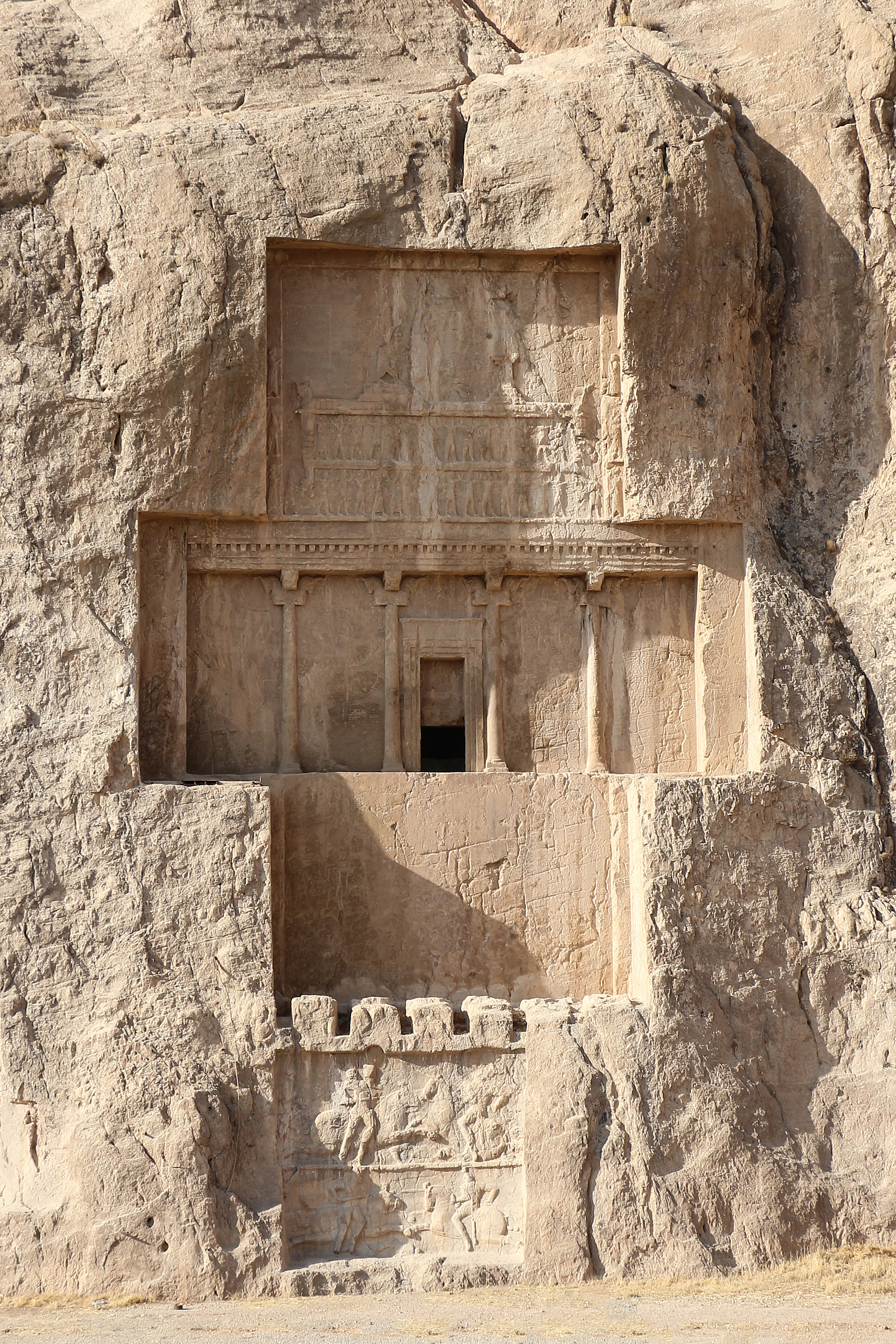
- Full-scope view of Darius I's tomb at Naqsh-e Rostam, 2016

- Location within Iran

Religion
- Affiliation: Zoroastrianism
- Region: Persis

Location
- Location: Marvdasht, Fars
- Country: Iran

Architecture
- Type: Achaemenid
- Inscriptions: DNa inscription
- Materials: Stone

The tomb of Darius the Great (or Darius I) is one of the four tombs for Achaemenid kings at the historical site of Naqsh-e Rostam, located about 12 kilometres (7.5 mi) northwest of Persepolis in Iran. They are all situated at a considerable height above ground-level.

== The tomb ==
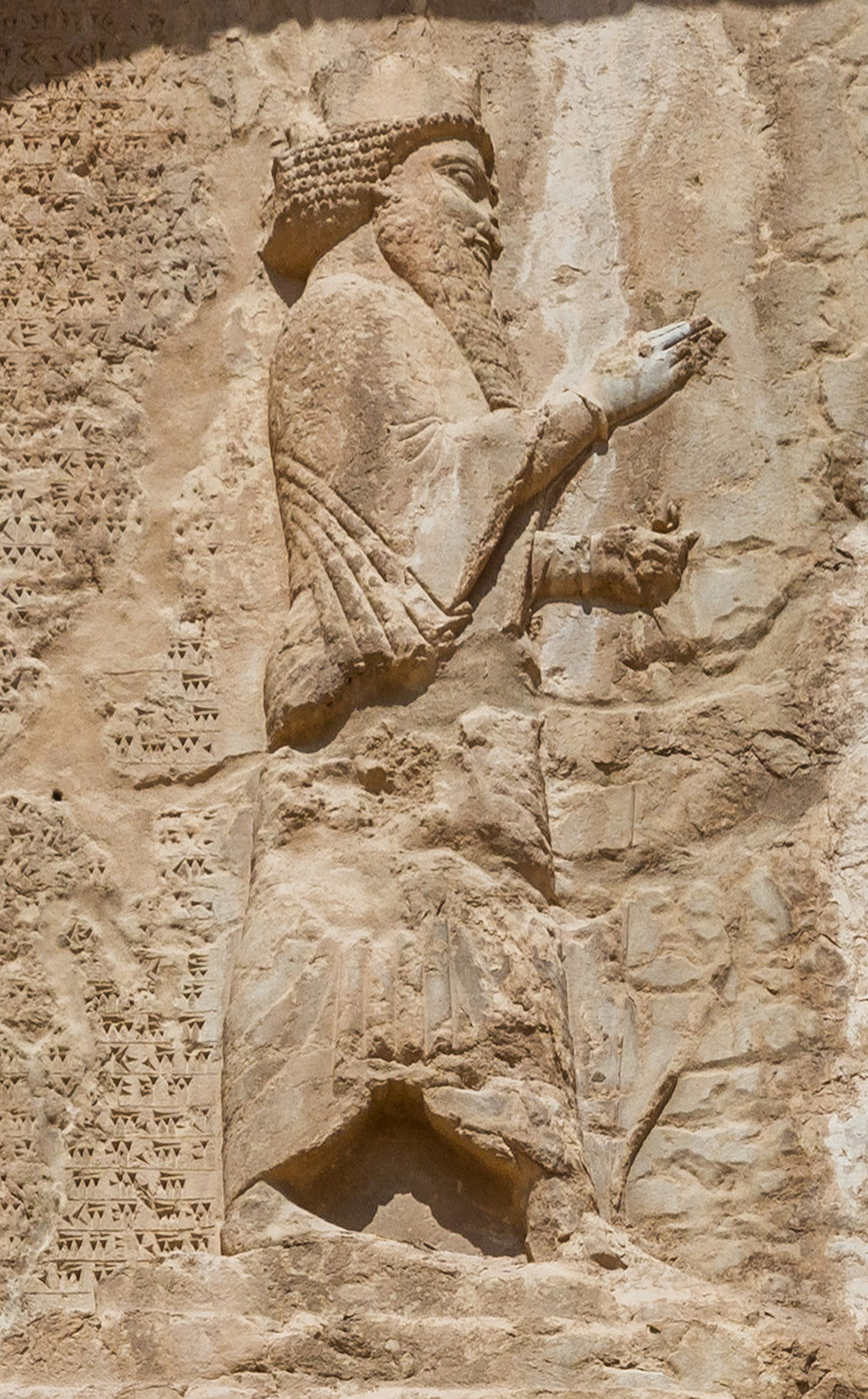
Carving of Darius I on the tomb

One of the tombs is explicitly identified by an accompanying inscription to be the tomb of Darius I (r. 522–486 BCE). The other three tombs are believed to be those of Xerxes I (r. 486–465 BCE), Artaxerxes I (r. 465–424 BCE), and Darius II (r. 423–404 BCE); the fifth tomb (incomplete) might be that of Artaxerxes III (r. 358–338 BCE) or the last Achaemenid king, Darius III (r. 336–330 BCE). The tombs were looted extensively following the conquest of Persia by Alexander the Great.

== The inscriptions ==
=== DNa inscription ===
An inscription by Darius I, dating from c. 490 BCE and generally referred to as the "DNa inscription" (Darius Naqsh-e Rostam inscription "a") in scholarly works, appears in the top-left corner of the façade of his tomb and mentions his conquests as well as his various achievements. Its exact date is not known, but it is assumed to be from the last decade of his reign. Like several other of Darius' inscriptions, the territories controlled by the Achaemenid Persian Empire (which reached its territorial zenith under Darius' rule) are clearly listed.

Inscription of Darius the Great (DNa inscription)
English translation	Original
A great god is Ahuramazda, who created this earth, who created yonder sky, who created man, who created happiness for man, who made Darius king, one king of many, one lord of many. I am Darius the great king, king of kings, king of countries containing all kinds of men, king in this great earth far and wide, son of Hystaspes, an Achaemenid, a Persian, son of a Persian, an Aryan, having Aryan lineage. King Darius says: By the favor of Ahuramazda these are the countries which I seized outside of Persia; I ruled over them; they bore tribute to me; they did what was said to them by me; they held my law firmly; Media, Elam, Parthia, Aria, Bactria, Sogdia, Chorasmia, Drangiana, Arachosia, Sattagydia, Gandhara [Gadâra], India [Hiduš], the haoma-drinking Scythians, the Scythians with pointed caps, Babylonia, Assyria, Arabia, Egypt, Armenia, Cappadocia, Lydia, the Greeks [Yaunâ], the Scythians across the sea [Sakâ], Thrace, the petasos-wearing Greeks [Yaunâ], the Libyans, the Nubians, the men of Maka and the Carians. King Darius says: Ahuramazda, when he saw this earth in commotion, thereafter bestowed it upon me, made me king; I am king. By the favor of Ahuramazda I put it down in its place; what I said to them, that they did, as was my desire. If now you shall think that "How many are the countries which King Darius held?" look at the sculptures [of those] who bear the throne, then shall you know, then shall it become known to you: the spear of a Persian man has gone forth far; then shall it become known to you: a Persian man has delivered battle far indeed from Persia. Darius the King says: This which has been done, all that by the will of Ahuramazda I did. Ahuramazda bore me aid, until I did the work. May Ahuramazda protect me from harm, and my royal house, and this land: this I pray of Ahuramazda, this may Ahuramazda give to me! O man, that which is the command of Ahuramazda, let this not seem repugnant to you; do not leave the right path; do not rise in rebellion! — DNa inscription of Darius I	The DNa inscription on the upper-left corner of the façade of Darius I's tomb at Naqsh-e Rostam

=== DNe inscription ===
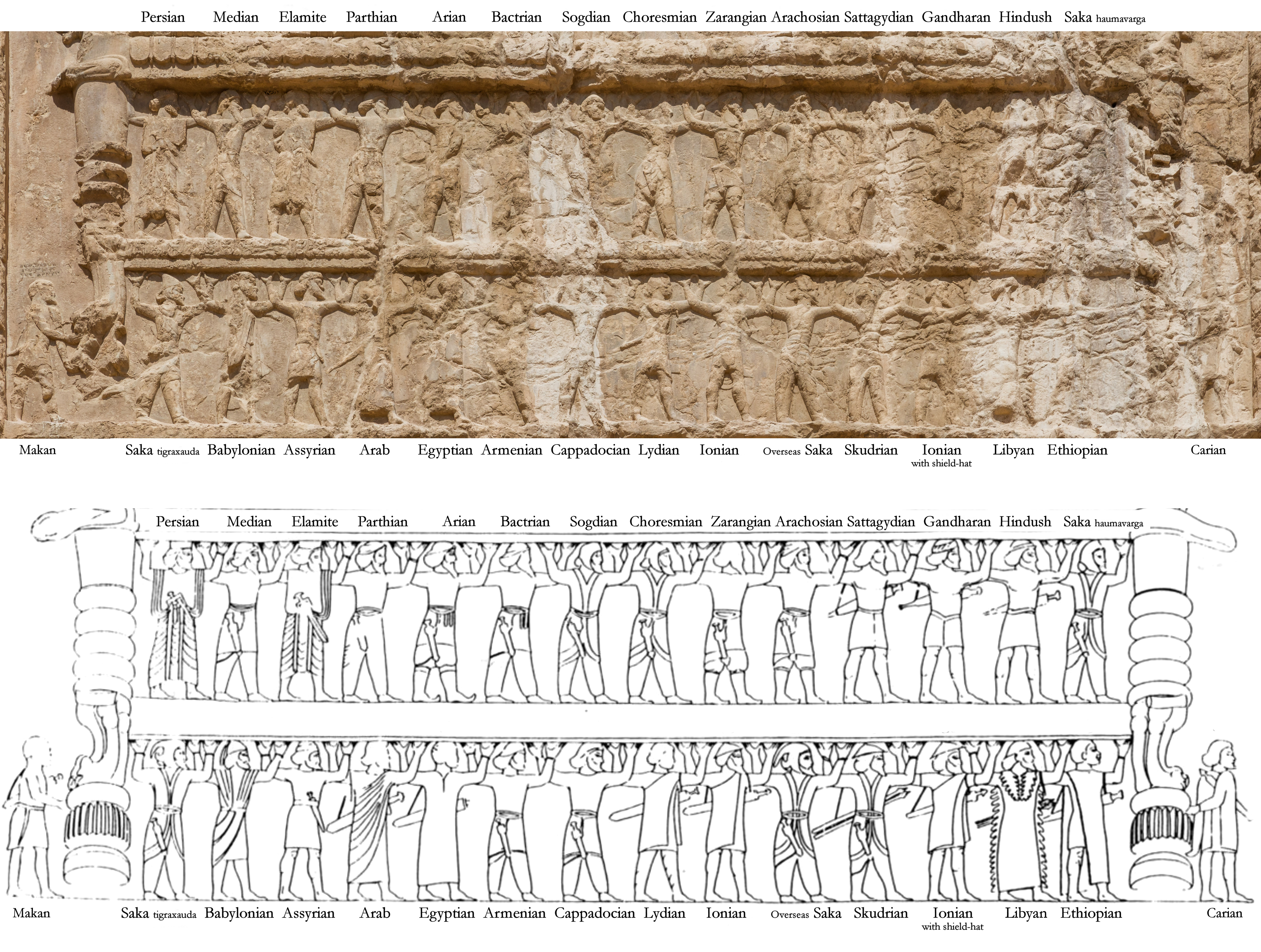
Ethnicities of the Achaemenid Persian Empire depicted on the tomb of Darius the Great. The nationalities mentioned in the DNa inscription are also depicted on the upper registers of all the tombs at Naqsh-e Rostam, starting with Darius' tomb. The ethnicities on Darius' tomb further have trilingual labels over them for identification, collectively known as the DNe inscription; one of the best preserved friezes is that of Xerxes I.

The nationalities mentioned in the DNa inscription are also depicted on the upper registers of all the tombs at Naqsh-e Rostam (starting with the tomb of Darius I) as a group of 30 Achaemenid soldiers who are in their native clothing and bearing weapons while supporting the platform on which the King of Kings stands for his devotion to Ahuramazda, the highest deity of Zoroastrianism. One of the best preserved friezes is that of Xerxes I.

All of the 30 soldiers on the tomb of Darius further have trilingual labels over them for their ethnic identification, known collectively as the DNe inscription (Darius Naqsh-i Rostam inscription "e") in scholarly works. One of the last rulers of the Achaemenid dynasty, Artaxerxes II (r. 404–358 BCE), also uses the same labels over the soldiers as depicted on his own tomb in Persepolis. These are known collectively as the "A2Pa Inscription".

The inscription identifies the ethnicity of all 30 soldiers:

#𐎡𐎹𐎶𐏐𐎱𐎠𐎼𐎿 (iyam\Pārsa) This is a Persian

1. 𐎡𐎹𐎶𐏐𐎶𐎠𐎭 (iyam\Mâda) This is a Mede
2. 𐎡𐎹𐎶𐏐𐎢𐎺𐎹 (iyam\Uvja) This is an Elamite
3. 𐎡𐎹𐎶𐏐𐎠𐎰𐎢𐎾𐎡𐎹 (iyam\Āthūriyā) This is an Assyrian

— DNe inscription of Darius I (excerpt)

The nationalities of the soldiers depicted on the reliefs and mentioned in the individual labels of the DNe inscription are, from left to right: Makan, Persian, Median, Elamite, Parthian, Arian Bactrian, Sogdian, Choresmian, Zarangian, Arachosian, Sattagydian, Gandharan, Hindush, Saka (Haumavarga), Saka (Tigraxauda), Babylonian, Assyrian, Arab, Egyptian, Armenian, Cappadocian, Lydian, Ionian, Saka "beyond the sea", Skudrian (Thracian), Macedonian, Libyan, Nubian, and Carian.

== Gallery ==
Naqsh-e Rostam نقش رستم
- Location within Iran
- Coordinates: 29°59′20″N 52°52′29″E

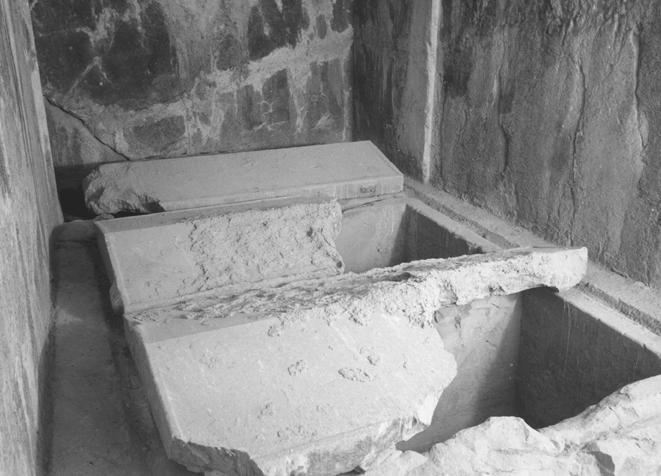
Two graves in the tomb of Darius I, 2012. The graves, which once housed the remains of Darius and his wife Atossa, were looted after Alexander the Great's conquest of Persia.

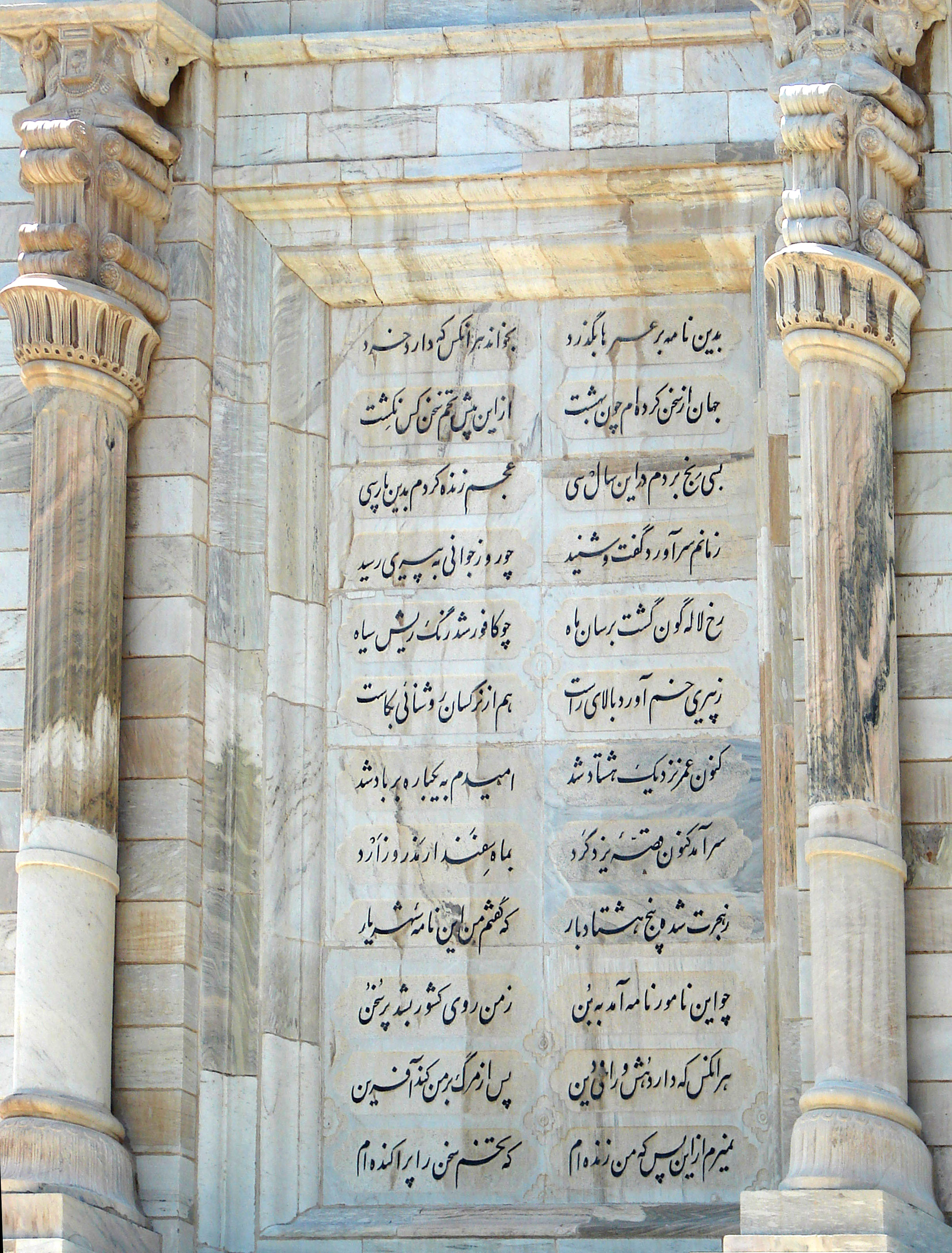
Ferdowsi's self-narration's inscription in his tomb, based on the architecture of Achaemenid tombs. Toos, Mashhad

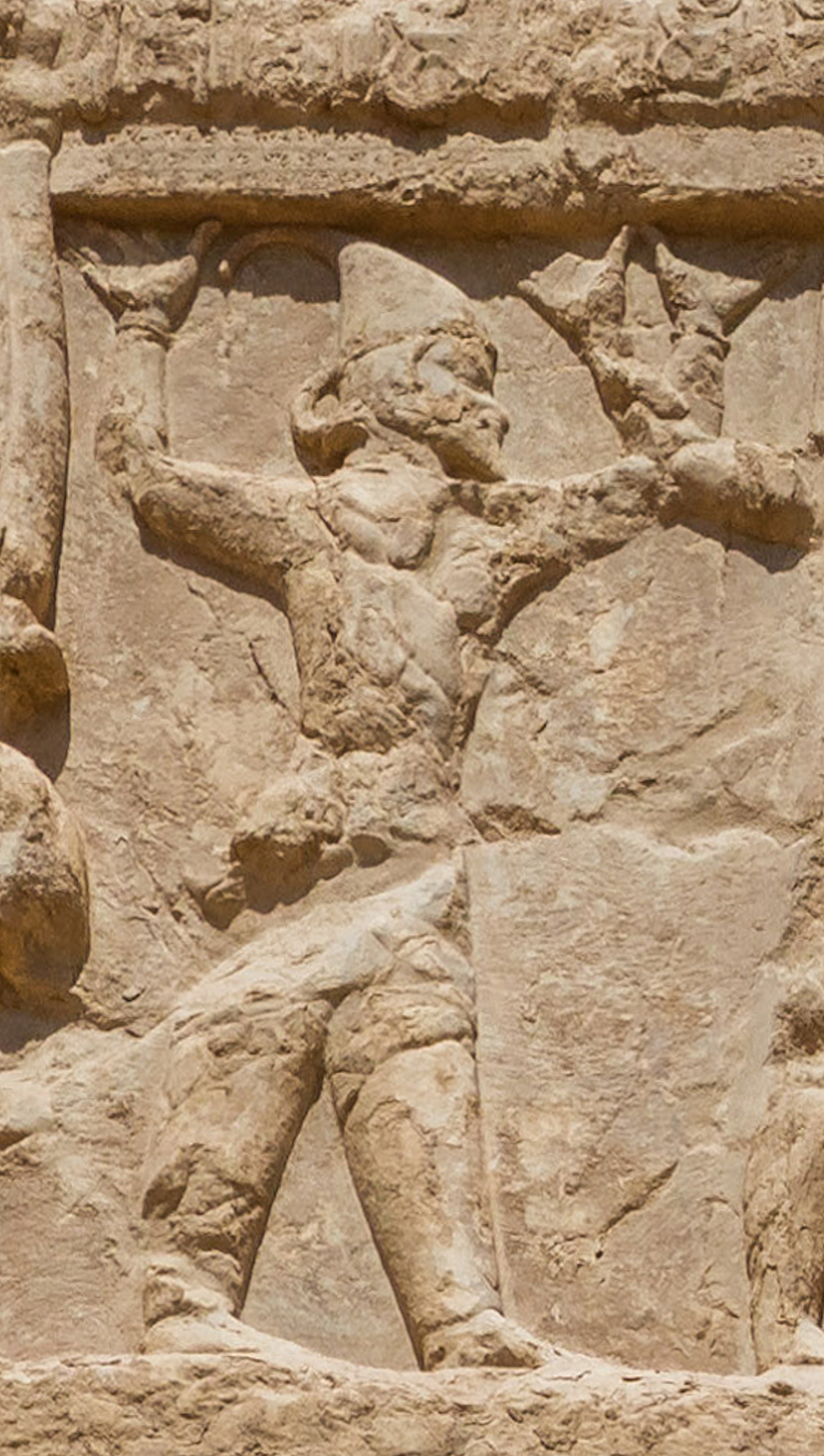
Scythian soldier with trilingual identification label on lintel, 2018

== See also ==
- Achaemenid architecture
- Cities of the ancient Near East
- List of colossal sculpture in situ
- Naqsh-e Rajab

== Bibliography ==
- Herrmann, G. & Curtis, V. S. (2003). "Sasanian Rock Reliefs". Encyclopedia Iranica. Costa Mesa: Mazda. Archived from the original on 2007-12-15.
- Hubertus von Gall "NAQŠ-E ROSTAM" in Encyclopædia Iranica
- Lendering, Jona (2009). "Naqsh-i Rustam". Amsterdam: Livius. Archived from the original on 2016-03-03.
- Unknown (2005). "Naghsh-e-Rostam".
