= Old Persian (Unicode block) =

- Range: U+103A0..U+103DF (64 code points)
- Plane: SMP
- Scripts: Old Persian
- Major alphabets: Old Persian
- Assigned: 50 code points
- Unused: 14 reserved code points

Unicode version history
- 4.1 (2005): 50 (+50)

Unicode documentation
- Code chart ∣ Web page

Old Persian is a Unicode block containing cuneiform characters for writing the Old Persian language of the Achaemenid Empire.

Old Persian^{[1]}^{[2]} Official Unicode Consortium code chart (PDF)
	0	1	2	3	4	5	6	7	8	9	A	B	C	D	E	F
U+103Ax	𐎠	𐎡	𐎢	𐎣	𐎤	𐎥	𐎦	𐎧	𐎨	𐎩	𐎪	𐎫	𐎬	𐎭	𐎮	𐎯
U+103Bx	𐎰	𐎱	𐎲	𐎳	𐎴	𐎵	𐎶	𐎷	𐎸	𐎹	𐎺	𐎻	𐎼	𐎽	𐎾	𐎿
U+103Cx	𐏀	𐏁	𐏂	𐏃					𐏈	𐏉	𐏊	𐏋	𐏌	𐏍	𐏎	𐏏
U+103Dx	𐏐	𐏑	𐏒	𐏓	𐏔	𐏕										
Notes: 1. As of Unicode version 16.0; 2. Grey areas indicate non-assigned code points

== History ==
The following Unicode-related documents record the purpose and process of defining specific characters in the Old Persian block:

Version	Final code points (Note: Proposed code points and characters names may differ from final code points and names)	Count	L2 ID	WG2 ID	Document
4.1	U+103A0..103C3, 103C8..103D5	50	L2/97-269	N1639	Everson, Michael (1997-09-18), Proposal to encode Old Persian Cuneiform, Plane 1
4.1	U+103A0..103C3, 103C8..103D5	50	L2/98-070		Aliprand, Joan; Winkler, Arnold, "3.A.4. item c. Old Persian Cuneiform", Minutes of the joint UTC and L2 meeting from the meeting in Cupertino, February 25-27, 1998
4.1	U+103A0..103C3, 103C8..103D5	50	L2/98-286	N1703	Umamaheswaran, V. S.; Ksar, Mike (1998-07-02), "8.19", Unconfirmed Meeting Minutes, WG 2 Meeting #34, Redmond, WA, USA; 1998-03-16--20
4.1	U+103A0..103C3, 103C8..103D5	50	L2/99-224	N2097, N2025-2	Röllig, W. (1999-07-23), Comments on proposals for the Universal Multiple-Octed Coded Character Set
4.1	U+103A0..103C3, 103C8..103D5	50		N2133	Response to comments on the question of encoding Old Semitic scripts in the UCS (N2097), 1999-10-04
4.1	U+103A0..103C3, 103C8..103D5	50	L2/00-010	N2103	Umamaheswaran, V. S. (2000-01-05), "10.4", Minutes of WG 2 meeting 37, Copenhagen, Denmark: 1999-09-13—16
4.1	U+103A0..103C3, 103C8..103D5	50	L2/00-128		Bunz, Carl-Martin (2000-03-01), Scripts from the Past in Future Versions of Unicode
4.1	U+103A0..103C3, 103C8..103D5	50	L2/01-007		Bunz, Carl-Martin (2000-12-21), "Old Persian cuneiform", Iranianist Meeting Report: Symposium on Encoding Iranian Scripts in Unicode
4.1	U+103A0..103C3, 103C8..103D5	50	L2/02-009		Bunz, Carl-Martin (2001-11-23), "Old Persian cuneiform script", 2nd Iranian Meeting Report
4.1	U+103A0..103C3, 103C8..103D5	50	L2/03-097	N2545	Everson, Michael (2002-12-03), Revised proposal to encode the Old Persian script in the UCS
4.1	U+103A0..103C3, 103C8..103D5	50	L2/03-149R	N2583R	Everson, Michael (2003-09-18), Final proposal to encode the Old Persian script in the UCS
4.1	U+103A0..103C3, 103C8..103D5	50	L2/05-289		Whistler, Ken (2005-10-06), Cuneiform property inconsistencies
4.1	U+103A0..103C3, 103C8..103D5	50	L2/05-279		Moore, Lisa (2005-11-10), "B.14.1", UTC #105 Minutes
