= Apollodorus of Artemita =

Ancient Greek historian

Apollodorus of Artemita (Ancient Greek: Ἀπολλόδωρος Ἀρτεμιτηνός) was a Greek historian who flourished between 130 and 87 BC. He hailed from the Greco-Parthian city of Artemita in Apolloniatis and was a citizen of the Parthian Empire.

== Biography ==
Appollodorus's dates of birth and death are unknown. He is generally assumed to have flourished in 130–87 BC, but 99–66 BC and 66–44 BC have also been proposed as options. Apollodorus wrote a history of the Parthian Empire, the Parthika (Ancient Greek: τὰ Παρθικὰ), in at least four books. He is quoted by Strabo and Athenaeus. Strabo stated that he was very reliable. Apollodorus seems to have used the archives of Artemita and Seleucia on the Tigris for his work. Some information on the Greco-Bactrians are preserved in Strabo's work:

"The Greeks who caused Bactria to revolt grew so powerful on account of the fertility of the country that they became masters, not only of Ariana, but also of India, as Apollodorus of Artemita says: and more tribes were subdued by them than by Alexander—by Menander in particular (at least if he actually crossed the Hypanis towards the east and advanced as far as the Imaus), for some were subdued by him personally and others by Demetrius, the son of Euthydemus the king of the Bactrians; and they took possession, not only of Patalena, but also, on the rest of the coast, of what is called the kingdom of Saraostus and Sigerdis. In short, Apollodorus says that Bactriana is the ornament of Ariana as a whole; and, more than that, they extended their empire even as far as the Seres and the Phryni." (Strabo, Geographia, 11.11.1)

He is also quoted for his general geographical knowledge of Central Asia:

"Accordingly, if the distance from Hyrcania to Artemita in Babylonia is eight thousand stadia, as is stated by Apollodorus of Artemita, and the distance from there to the mouth of the Persian Sea another eight thousand, and again eight thousand, or a little less, to the places that lie on the same parallel as the extremities of Ethiopia, there would remain of the above-mentioned breadth of the inhabited world the distance which I have already given,[14] from the recess of the Hyrcanian Sea to the mouth of that sea" (Strabo, Geographia, 11.11.1)

== Sources ==
- Chaumont, M. L. (1986). "APOLLODORUS OF ARTIMITA". Encyclopaedia Iranica, Vol. II, Fasc. 2. pp. 160–161.
