= Sabata (city) =

Sabata or Sabdata (Plin. vi. 27. s. 31), was an ancient town of Sittacene, Assyria, probably the same place as the Σαβαθά (Sabatha)of Zosimus (iii. 23), which that writer describes as 30 stadia from the ancient Seleuceia. It is also mentioned by Abulfeda (p. 253) under the name of Sabach.
