= Seleucia (Sittacene) =

Seleucia (Greek: Σελεύκεια, also transliterated as Seleuceia, Seleukeia, Seleukheia; formerly Coche or Mahoza, also Veh Ardashir) was an ancient city near the Euphrates river and across the Tigris from the better-known Seleucia on the Tigris, in Sittacene, Mesopotamia. The editors of the Barrington Atlas of the Greek and Roman World place the city at Sliq Kharawta in central Iraq.
