= Antiochia in Sittacene =

Ancient city in present-day Iraq

Antiochia in Sittacene (Greek: Αντιόχεια ή Σιτακηνή) was an ancient city founded in the Hellenistic period, possibly by Antiochus I. Pliny in his Natural History, Book 6, § 206, describes it as an important town in the western part of the ancient region of Sittacene, between the Tigris and Tornadotus rivers. Its present site is in Iraq.
