= Maka (satrapy) =

Achaemenid province

Maka (Old Persian: 𐎶𐎣 Maka-) was a satrapy (province) of the Achaemenid Empire, corresponding to Greek Gedrosia, in the barren coastal region of Makran in present-day Iran and Pakistan. Alternatively, it may have corresponded to modern-day Bahrain, Qatar, and United Arab Emirates, as well as the northern half of Oman (see Magan).

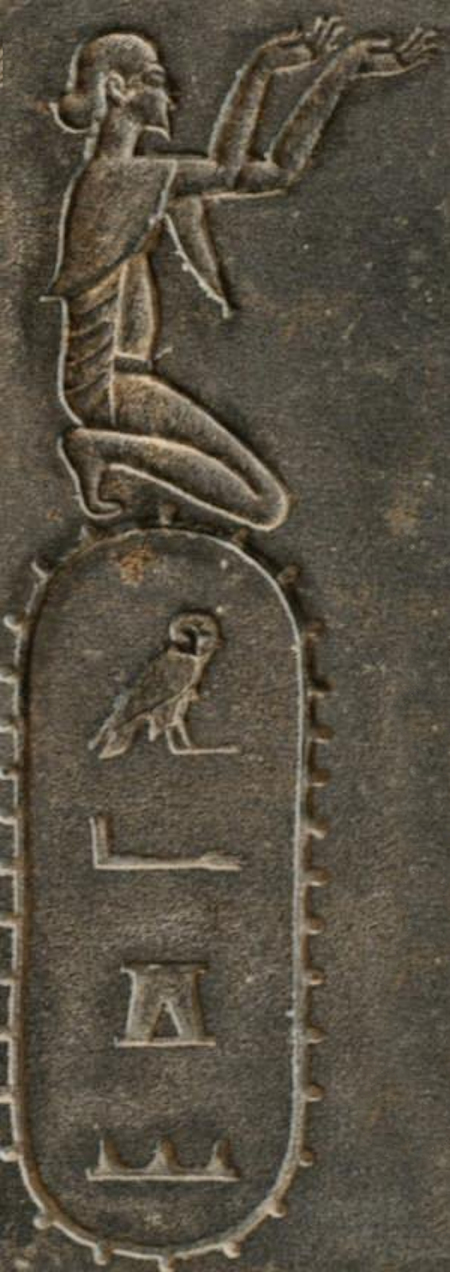
The territory of Maka (𓅓𓂝𓎼, M-ā-g) on the Statue of Darius I.

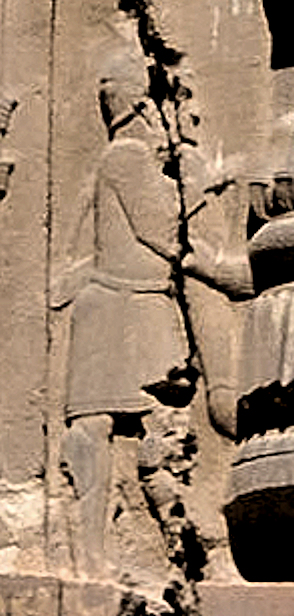
Makan on the tomb of Artaxerxes I, c. 430 BC.

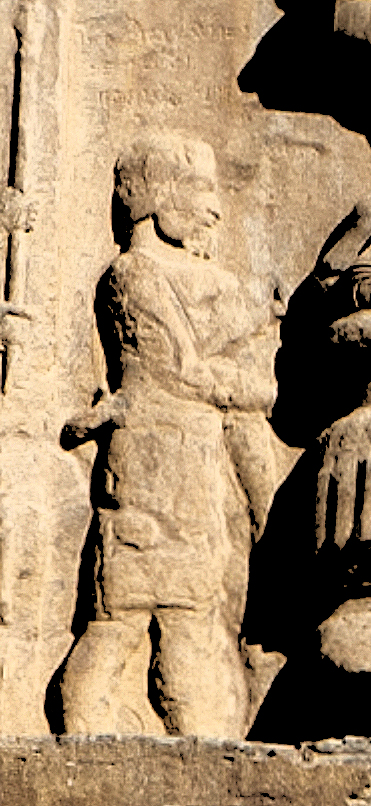
Makan with cuneiform identification label on the tomb of Artaxerxes II, c. 360 BC.

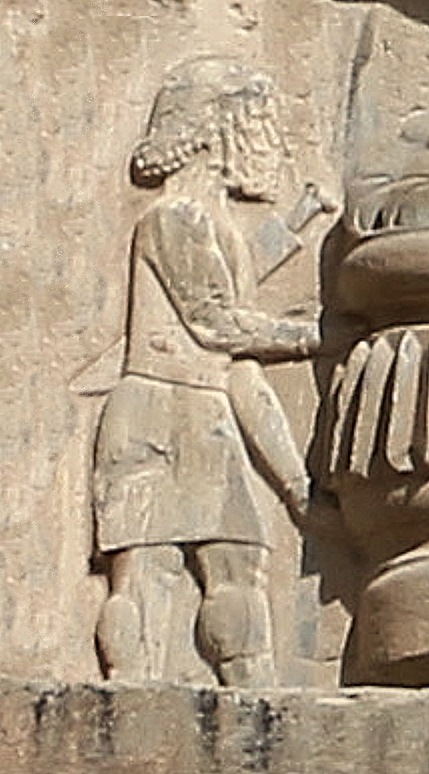
Maka soldier of the Achaemenid army, c. 338 BC. Tomb of Artaxerxes III.

Maka was already a part of the Achaemenid Empire before Darius the Great came to power in 522 BC, as mentioned in the Behistun inscription. As Cambyses and Smerdis are not known to have been there, it is possible that it was conquered by Cyrus the Great in 542 BC. He is known to have campaigned on the other side of the Persian Gulf where he apparently lost most of his army in the Gedrosian Desert. It continued to be a satrapy until Alexander's conquest of Persia, at which point it became independent. According to Herodotus, the Mykians belonged to the same tax district as the Drangians, Thamanaeans, Utians, Sagartians and "those deported to the Persian Gulf".

According to Fleming, Maka, in the area of Gedrosia, can be considered one of the Indian satrapies of the Achaemenid Empire. It later survived as a satrapy of the Parthian and Sasanian empires (Makuran or Mazun, based on identification).

== History ==
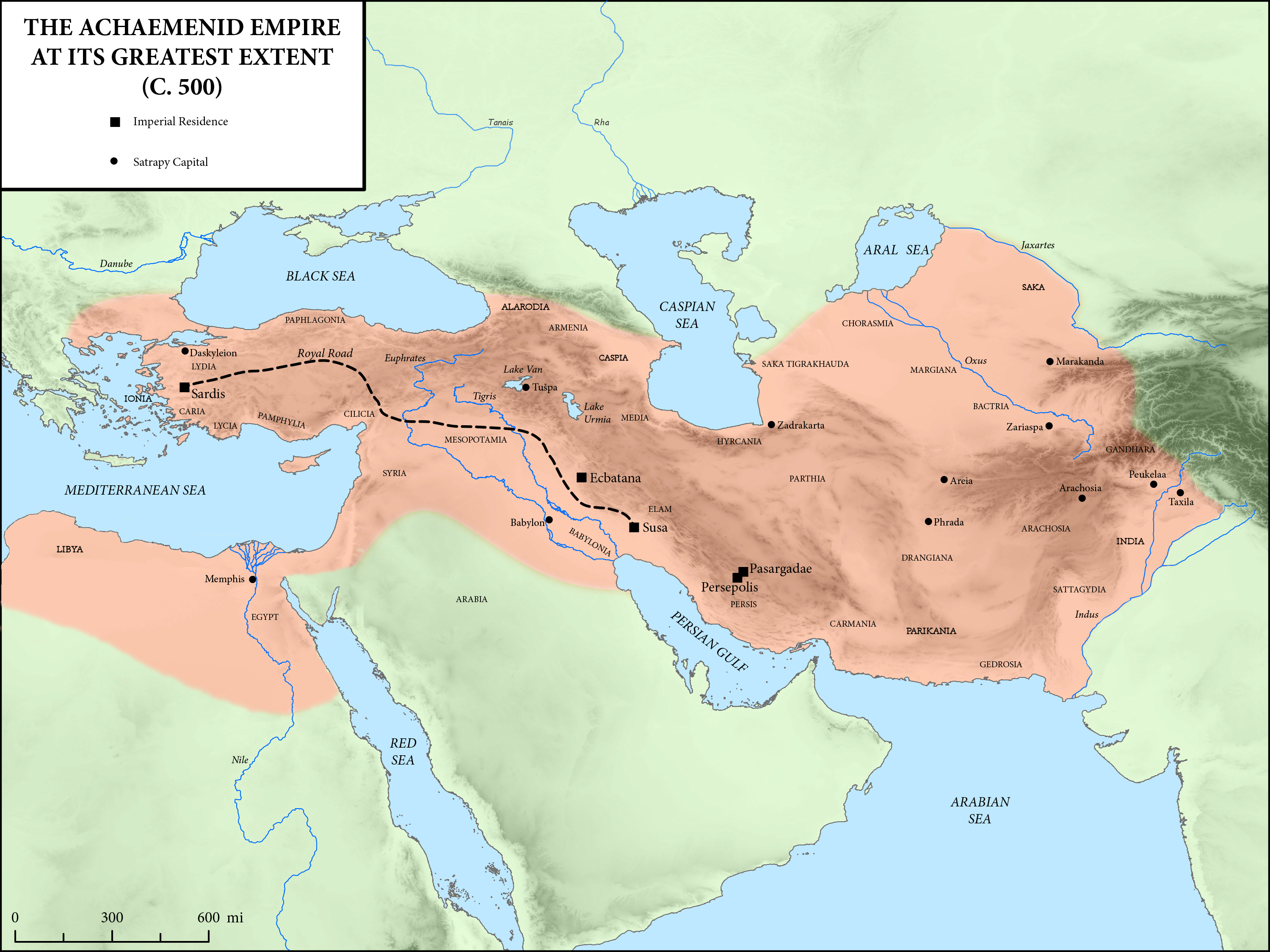
The Achaemenid Empire at its greatest extent, including the region of Maka (Gedrosia in Greek)

Maka was an important eastern satrapy of Cyrus the Great, founder of the Achaemenid Empire. The Babylonians used to make voyages via Maka to communicate with India. After Cyrus' death, Darius I of Persia succeeded his throne, and, according to Greek historian Herodotus, wanted to know more about Asia. He wished to know where the "Indus (which is the only river save one that had crocodiles) emptied itself into the sea". After personally leading his elite forces, whose ranks were restricted to those with Persian, Mede, or Elamite ancestry, to fight the invading Scythians, he led a campaign of conquest towards South Asia, conquering Sindh in 519 BC and constituting it as his 20th satrapy. After the fall of the Achaemenid Empire, Alexander the Great also crossed Maka in his campaign of conquest. His army marched through a harsh desert path in Makran, where he lost a significant number of soldiers due to the harsh desert conditions.

Herodotus on several occasions mentions the contributions of the "Mykians", who inhabited the eastern portion of the Achaemenid Empire. They are mentioned as "the men from Maka" in daiva inscriptions. The "Daiva inscription" is one of the most important of all Achaemenid inscriptions. The Mykians served in the army of Xerxes the Great at the battle of Thermopylae. They are also thought to be responsible for inventions such as qanats and underground drainage galleries that bring water from an aquifer on the piedmont to gardens or palm groves on the plains. These inventions were very important reasons behind the success of the empire. The Mykians of the other side of ancient Maka, the present day region of Balochistan and Sindh, are thought to have later become independent, as they are not mentioned in Arrian of Nicomedia's account of the campaigns of Alexander the Great; he mentions only the Omani side of Maka, which he calls "Maketa". The reasons for this may have been the arguably unjust rule of Xerxes.
