= Artemita =

Artemita (Ancient Greek: Ἀρτεμίτα) or Artemita in Apolloniatis was a Greek city in Sittacene, a region in what is now eastern Iraq. Artemita was already settled during the Assyrian Empire and later flourished under the Parthian Empire.

Though its location is probably near to the confluence of the river Radānu to the Tigris, on a route along the Tigris northwest of Seleucia. According to Isidore of Charax, it was crossed by the river Sillas (Diyala) and is located about ca. 90 km from Seleucia, and was already known since Tiglathpileser III in Assyrian cuneiform sources (second half of 8th century BCE) as Kār Aššur and later as Chalasar (Tabula Peutingeriana, Manî). Later it was settled again under the Greeks (Macedonian), but might have been considered Parthian. In AD 31, It welcomed the Arsacid pretender Tiridates II. Artemita was the birthplace of the historian Apollodorus of Artemita.

== See also ==
- List of ancient Greek cities
