= Sittacene =

Sittacene was an ancient region of Babylonia and Assyria situated about the main city of Sittace. Pliny in his Natural History, Book 6, §§ 205-206, places Sittacene between Chalonitis, Persis and Mesene and also between Arbelitis and Palestine (or that it also bore those names, id., vi. 27. s. 31). Besides Sittace, Sabata, and Antiochia are identified as important cities. The district of Sittacene appears to have been called in later times Apolloniatis (Strabo xi. p. 524), and which adjoined the province of Susis (xv. p. 732). It is probably the same country which Curtius calls Satrapene (v. 2).

Alexander the Great's forces marched through Sittacene on their way from Babylon to Susa. Curtius and Diodorus place Alexander's major reorganization of his forces between their reinforcement at Babylon and the campaign against Susa in Sittacene. (Curt. v. 1. 40-42, v. 2. 1–7; Diod. xvii. 65) A depiction of the games which were held to boost morale became the subject of a famous painting in the collection of the Getty Museum.

When Alexander the Great visited the region, he found a settlement of Greek Boeotians established there since the time of Xerxes' campaign against Greece. (Diod. 17, 110, 4-5).
