= Sattagydia =

Achaemenid province

Sattagydia 𐎰𐎫𐎦𐎢𐏁 Thataguš (Old Persian)
- Satrapy of the Achaemenid Empire
- 513 BCE–c. 4th century BCE
- Standard of Cyrus the Great

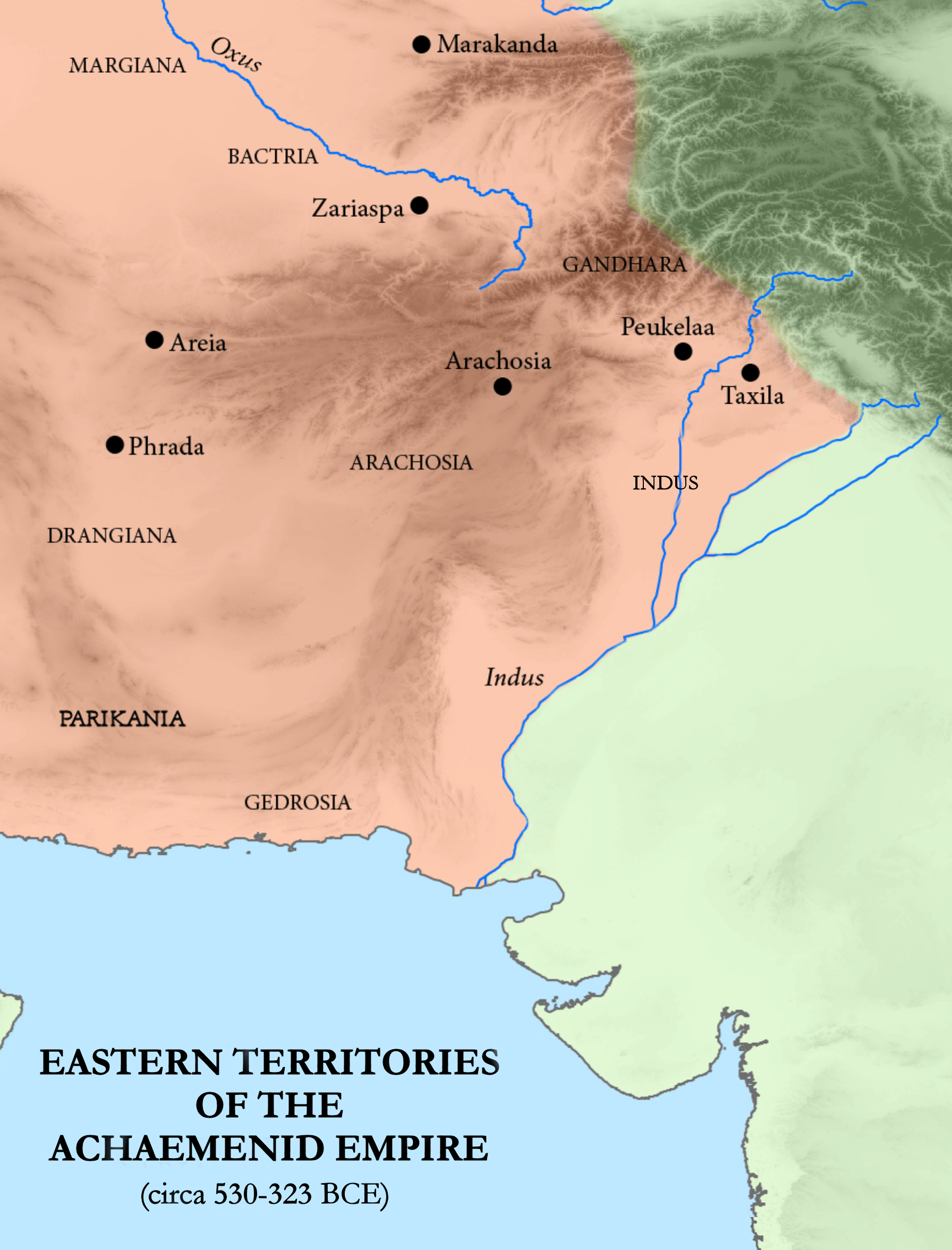
- Sāttagydiⁿa was part of the eastern territories of the Achaemenid Empire
- Government
  - Type: Monarchy
- King or King of Kings
  - 513–499 BCE: Darius I (first)
  - 358–338 BC: Artaxerxes III
- Historical era: Achaemenid era
  - Achaemenid conquest of the Indus Valley: 513 BCE
  - Disestablished: c. 4th century BCE
Preceded by	Succeeded by
Achaemenid Empire	Macedonian Empire

Sattagydia or Thatagush (Old Persian: 𐎰𐎫𐎦𐎢𐏁 Thataguš, country of the "hundred cows") was one of the easternmost regions of the Achaemenid Empire, part of its seventh tax district according to Herodotus, along with Gandārae, Dadicae and Aparytae. It was probably situated east of the Sulaiman Mountains up to the Indus around present-day Bannu Basin in Pakistan, although it probably encompassed Punjab as well. Sattagydia was no longer mentioned by the third century BC, probably having been absorbed into one of the adjoining provinces.

== Geography ==
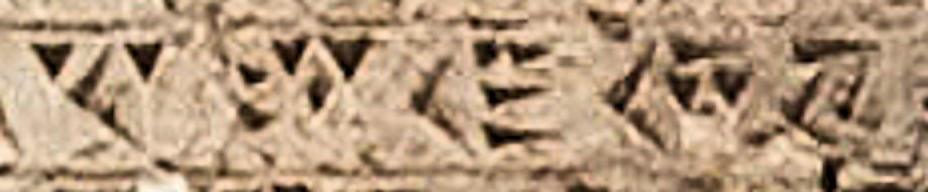
The name for Sattagydia (𐎰𐎫𐎦𐎢𐏁, Thataguš) in the DNa inscription of Darius I.

The location of Sattagydia has been subject to debate. Its association with Gandara in the 7th tax district of the Herodotus list implies that it was close to Gandara. Olmstead believed that it stretched from "the lower slopes of the Hindu Kush". Based on these considerations, two locations have been proposed: the first being "the area of the confluence of the Ghorband and Panjshir rivers in Afghanistan", and the second, "the area of the middle Indus, around the modern city of Bannu".

Following recent archaeological findings, the Bannu Basin has become the favoured choice. David Fleming points out that it is close to Kurram and Tochi rivers and it has four routes to the west, via the Khyber Pass, the Kurram river valley, the Gomal Pass and the Bolan Pass in Balochistan. Magee et al. have reported findings of recent archaeological excavations at Akra, noting that it was a large urban site that existed throughout the Iron Age and had trade relations with Central Asia. On the other hand, Bruno Jacobs maintains that Sattagydia largely coincided with Punjab, represented by the three kingdoms of Porus, Taxiles and Abisares at the time of invasion of Alexander the Great.

== People ==
Sattagydian Achaemenid soldier

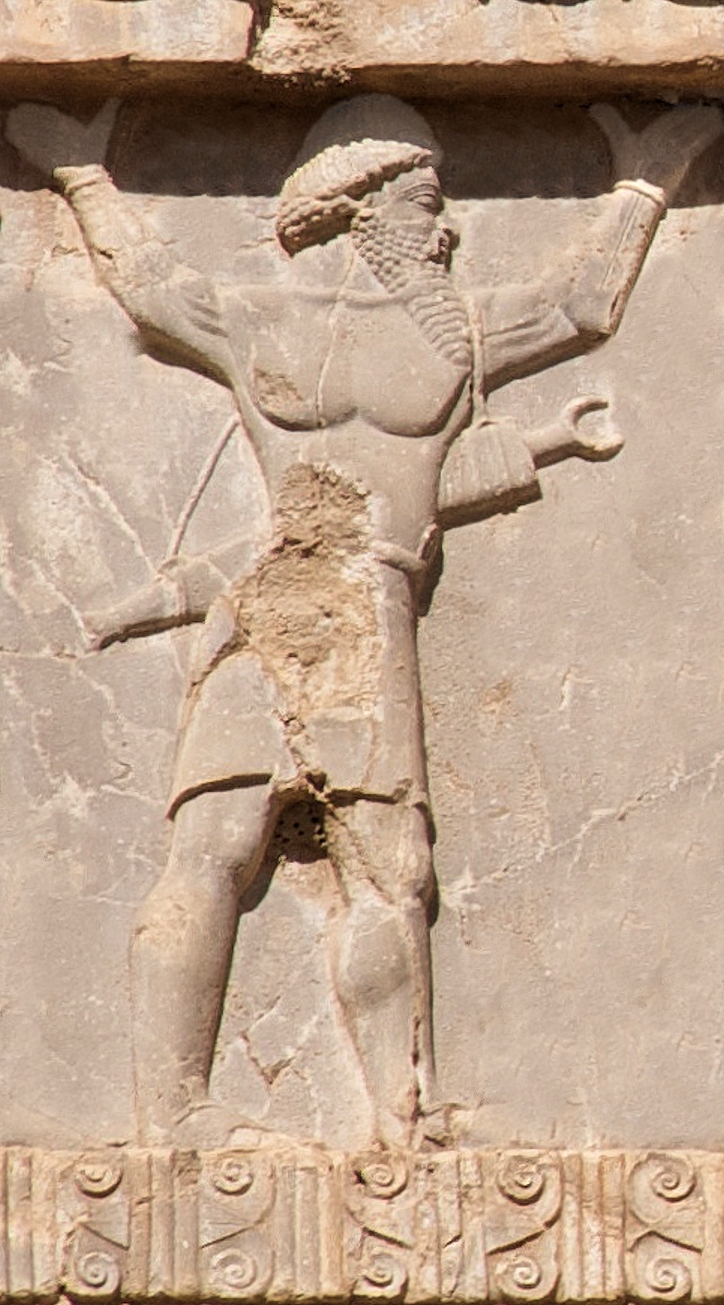
Xerxes I tomb, Sattagydian soldier of the Achaemenid army, circa 480 BCE.

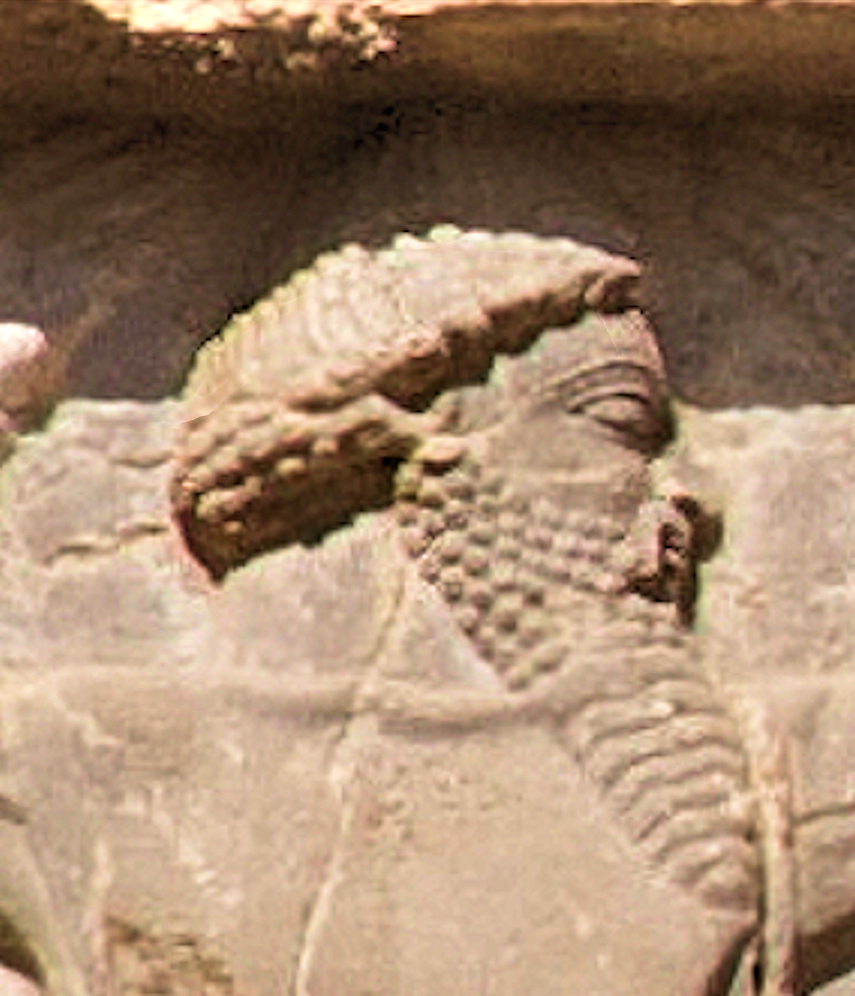
Xerxes I tomb, Sattagydian soldier circa 480 BCE (detail).

Representatives of Sattagydia are depicted as delegates bringing gifts to the king on the Apadana staircases, and as throne/ dais bearers on the Tripylon and Hall of One Hundred Columns reliefs at Persepolis. The representatives of Sattagydia are characterized by their loincloths, sandals, and exposed upper body, which distinguish them from the representatives of other eastern provinces such as Bactria and Arachosia. One Sattagydian (sa-da-ku-iš) is known to have been in charge of distribution of agricultural product in Shiraz, the region and its people are otherwise sparsely mentioned.

== History ==
Sattagydia

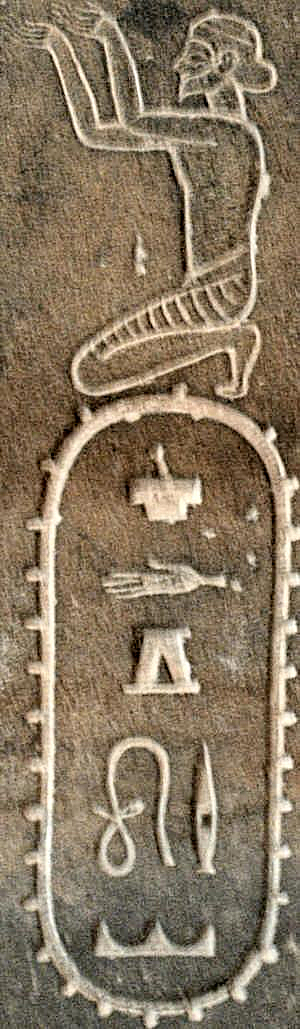
Sattagydia (𓐠𓂧𓎼𓍯𓍒𓈉, S-d-g-wꜣ-ḏꜣ), on the Egyptian Statue of Darius I.

Sattagydia is mentioned for the first time in the Behistun inscription of Darius the Great as one of the provinces in revolt while the king was in Babylon. The revolt was presumably suppressed in 515 BCE. The satrapy disappears from sources after 480 BCE, possible being mentioned by another name or included with other regions. After being conquered by Alexander the Great, Sattagydia became part of the Seleucid Empire.

== Bibliography ==
- Eggermont, Pierre Herman Leonard (1975). Alexander's Campaigns in Sind and Baluchistan and the Siege of the Brahmin Town of Harmatelia. Peeters Publishers. ISBN 978-90-6186-037-2.
- Fleming, David (1982). "Achaemenid Sattagydia and the geography of Vivana's campaigns (DB III, 54–75)". Journal of the Royal Asiatic Society of Great Britain & Ireland. 114 (2): 102–112. doi:10.1017/S0035869X00159155. ISSN 0035-869X.
- Magee, Peter; Petrie, Cameron; Knox, Richard; Khan, Farid; Thomas, Ken (2005). "The Achaemenid Empire in South Asia and Recent Excavations in Akra in Northwest Pakistan". American Journal of Archaeology. 109 (4): 711–741. doi:10.3764/aja.109.4.711. S2CID 54089753.
- Olmstead, A. T. (1948). History of the Persian Empire. University of Chicago Press. ISBN 978-0-226-62777-9.
