= Jar of Xerxes I =

1857 archaeological discovery

Jar of Xerxes I

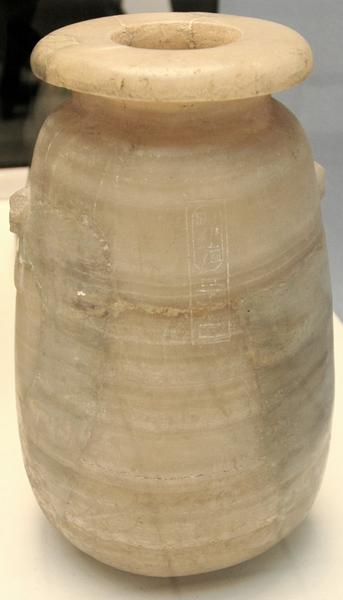
Jar of Xerxes I from the Mausoleum at Halicarnassus.

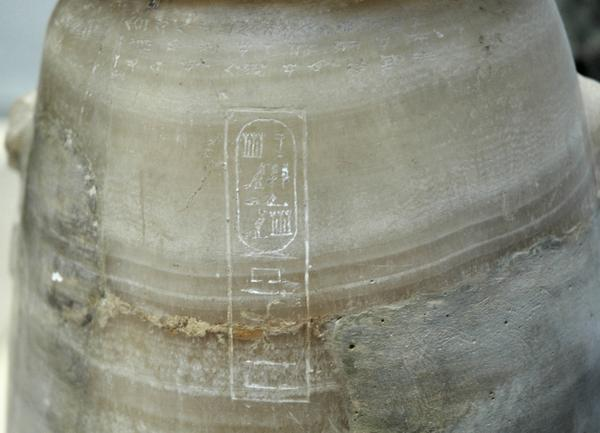
Detail of the inscription in Egyptian: "The great king Xerxes".

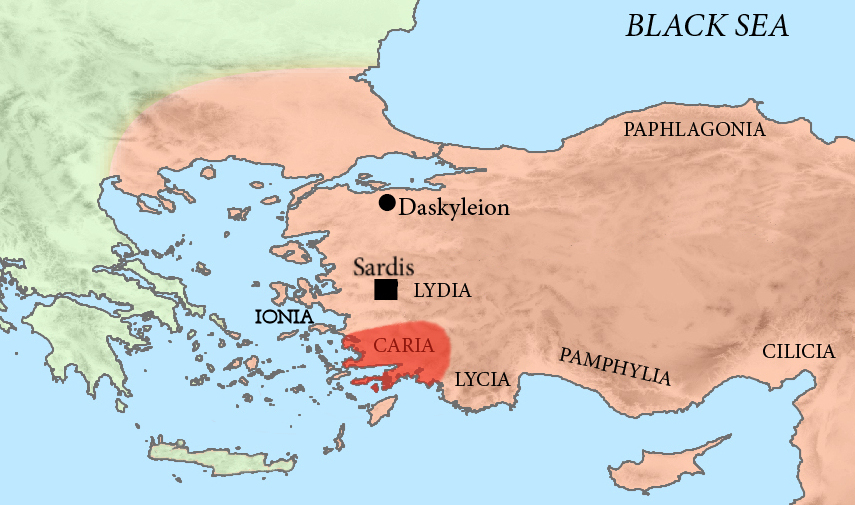
The jar was found in the ruins of the Mausoleum at Halicarnassus, in Caria, modern Turkey.

The Jar of Xerxes I is a jar in calcite or alabaster, an alabastron, with the quadrilingual signature of Achaemenid ruler Xerxes I (ruled 486–465 BC), which was discovered in the ruins of the Mausoleum at Halicarnassus, in Caria, modern Turkey, at the foot of the western staircase. It is now in the British Museum, though not currently on display.

== Description ==
The jar contains the same short inscription in Old Persian, Egyptian, Babylonian, and Elamite:

𐎧𐏁𐎹𐎠𐎼𐏁𐎠 𐏐 𐏋 𐏐 𐎺𐏀𐎼𐎣
(Xšayāršā : XŠ : vazraka)
"Xerxes : The Great King."

— Old Persian inscription on the Jar of Xerxes, Mausoleum at Halicarnassus.

The function of this jar is not well known. It may have contained some of the water from the Nile, received as a symbol of submission. A few other examples of broadly similar jars are known throughout the Achaemenid Empire, including jar from Darius I. The jar may have been part of the collection of the Carian Satrap, and testifies to the close contacts between Carian rulers and the Achaemenid Empire.

The vases, of Egyptian origin, were very precious to the Achaemenids, and may therefore have been offered by Xerxes to Carian rulers, and then kept as a precious object. In particular, the precious jar may have been offered by Xerxes to the Carian dynast Artemisia I, who had acted with merit as his only female Admiral during the Second Persian invasion of Greece, and particularly at the Battle of Salamis.

The Jar is located in the British Museum. Its height is 28.8 centimetres, its diameter 12.8 centimetres at the rim. It was excavated by Charles Thomas Newton in 1857.

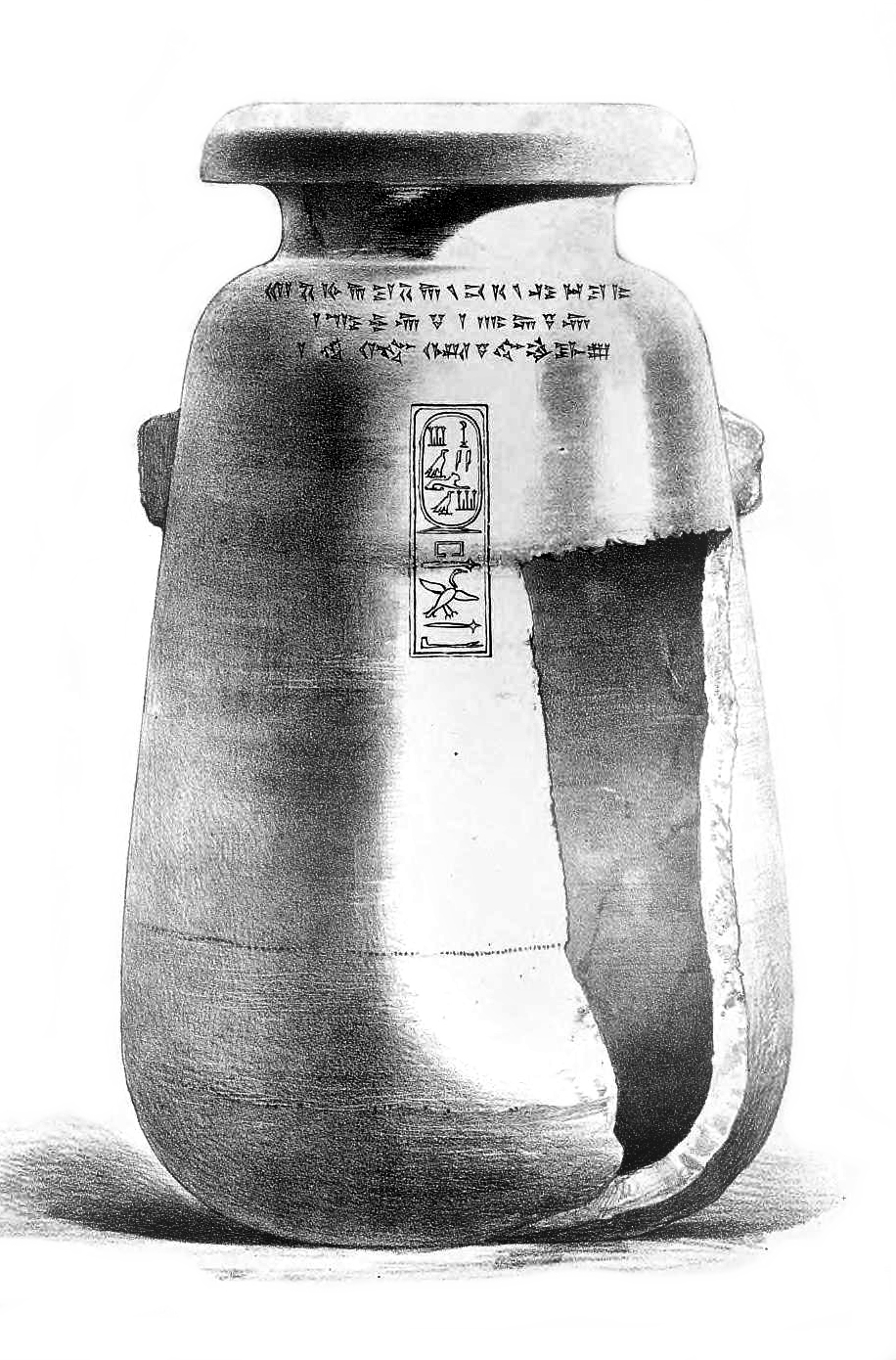
The Jar of Xerxes I, at time of discovery.

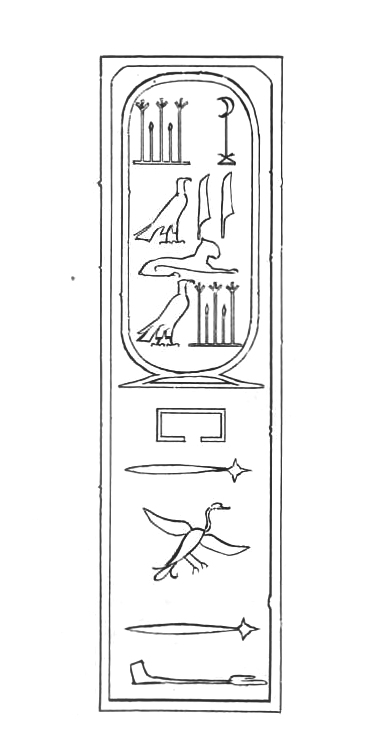
Hieroglyphic inscription on the jar: "The great king Xerxes".

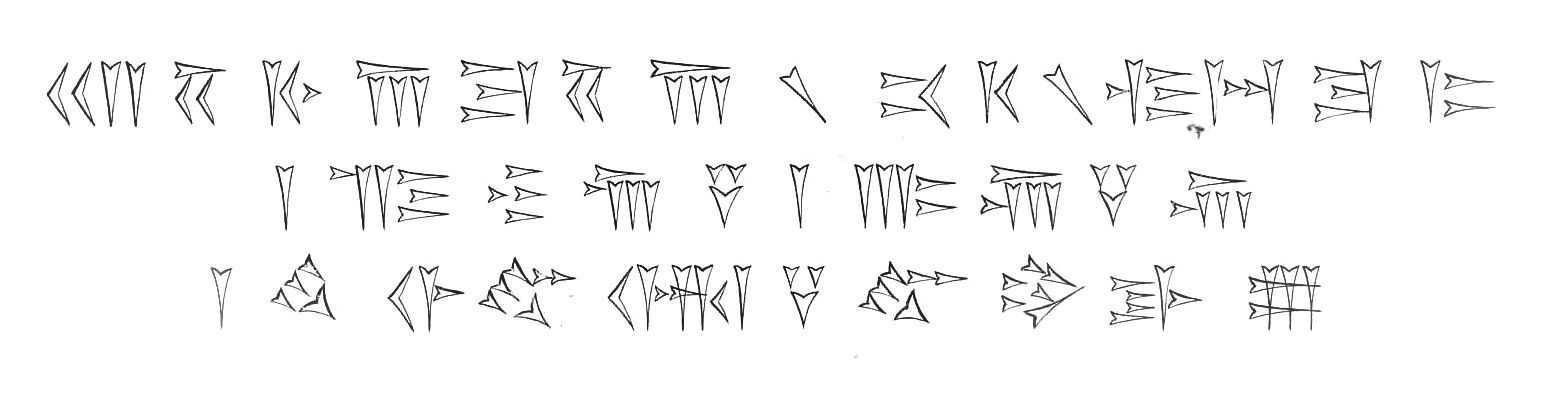
Cuneiform inscriptions on the jar ("The great king Xerxes" in three languages, Old Persian first).

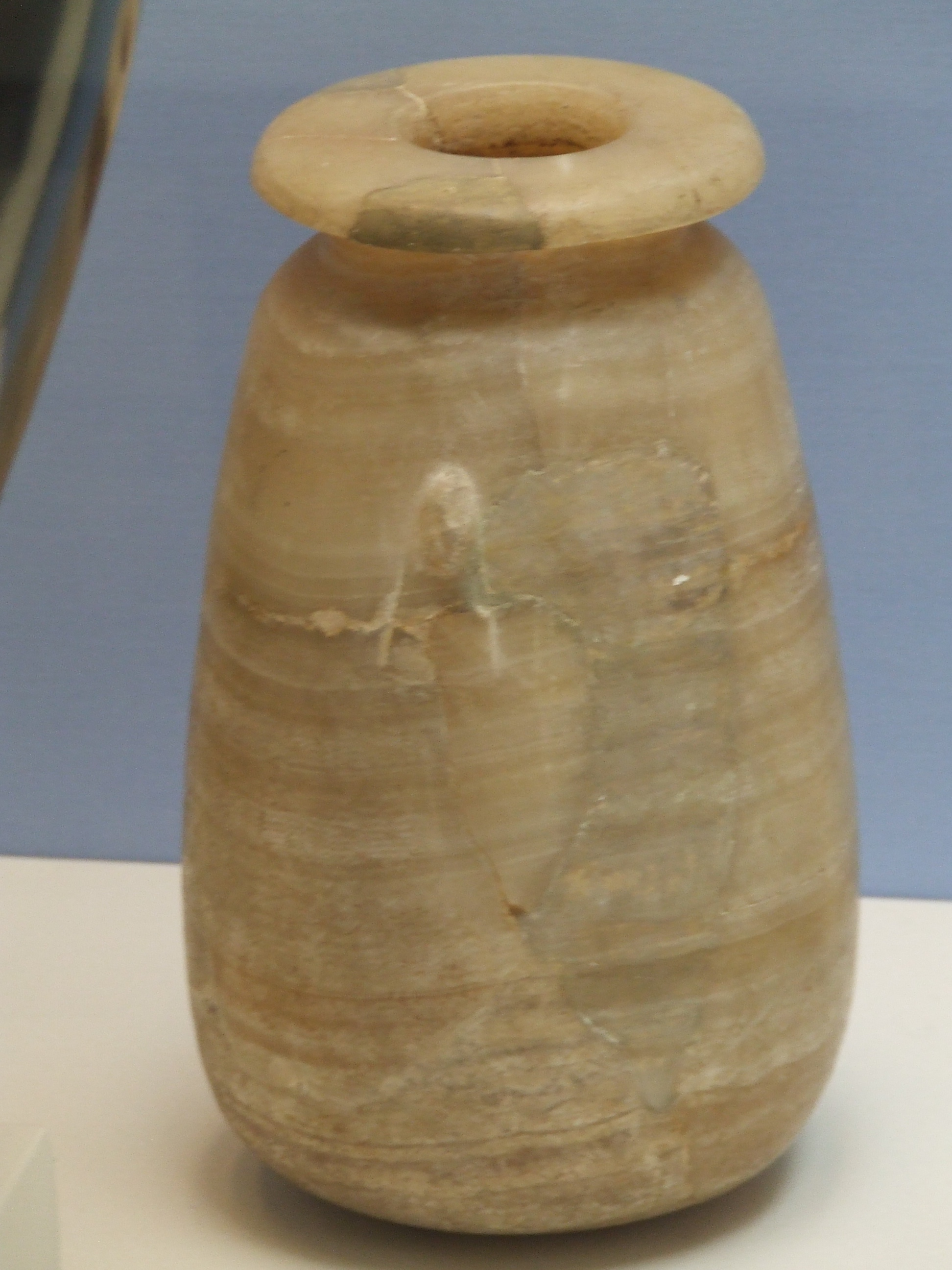
The jar in the British Museum (side)

== Similar jars ==
A few similar alabaster jar exist, from the time of Darius I to Xerxes, and to some later Achaemenid rulers, especially Artaxerxes I.

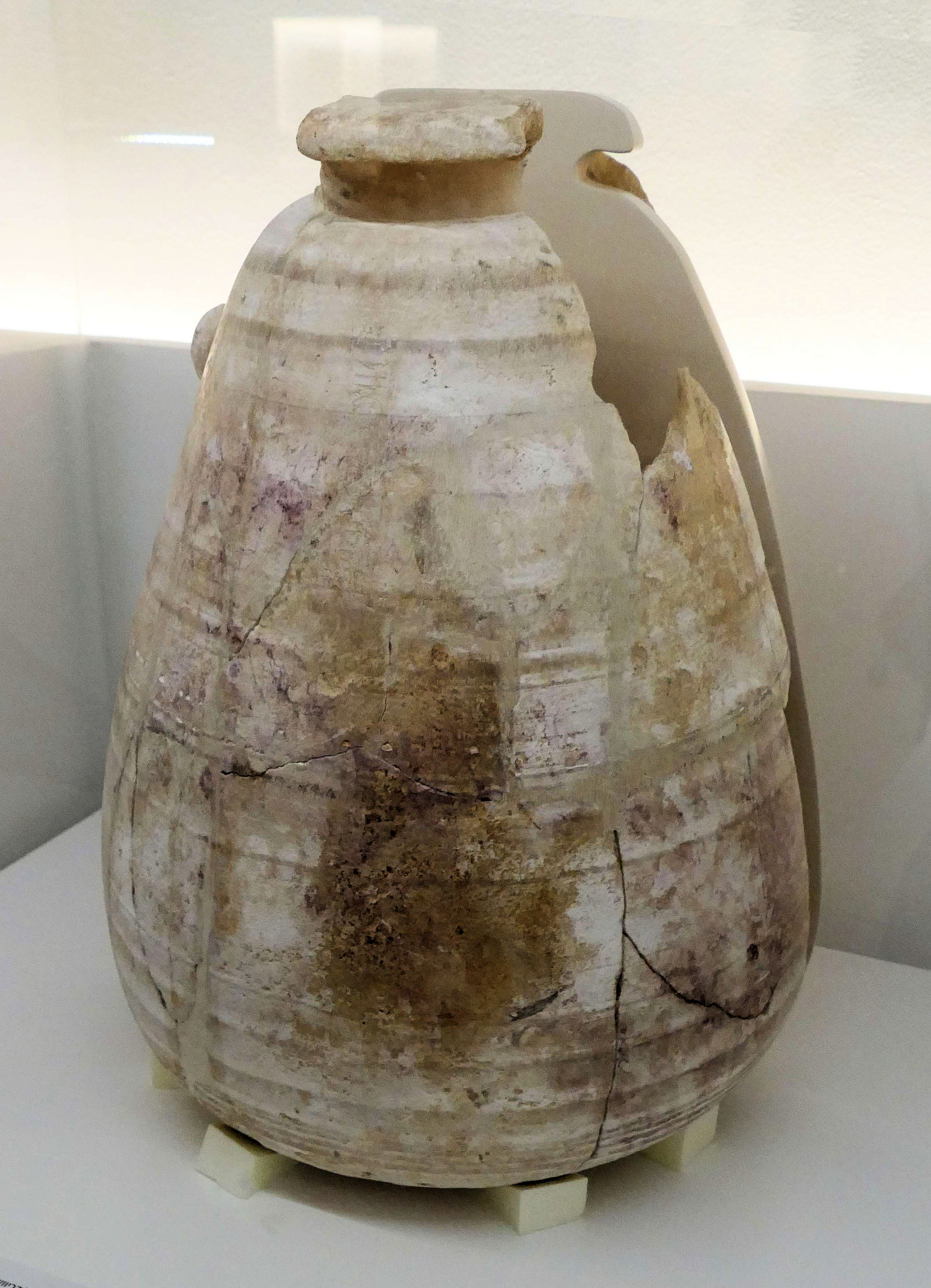
Egyptian alabaster vase of Darius I with quadrilingual hieroglyphic and cuneiform inscriptions

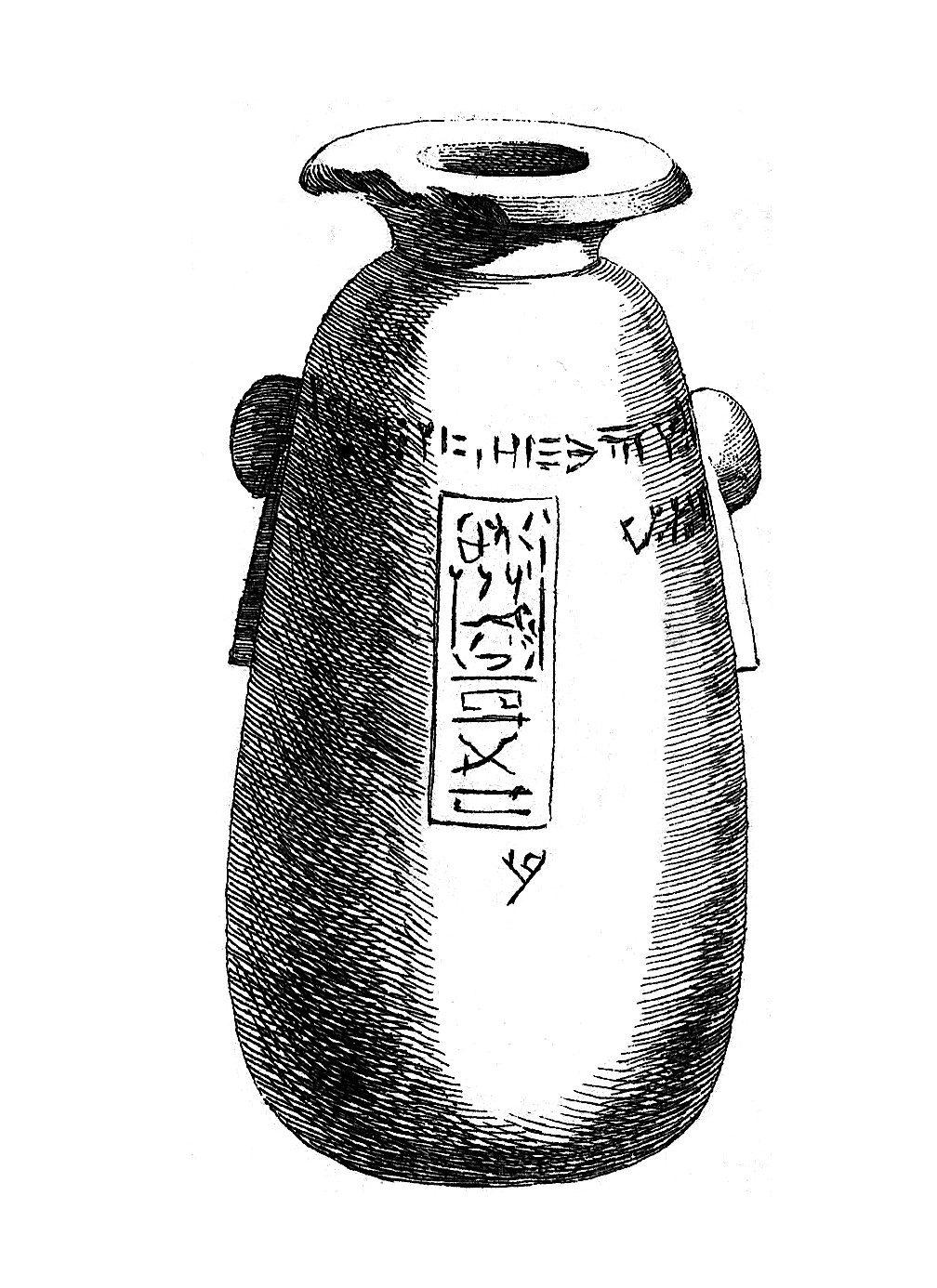
The Caylus vase, acquired circa 1760, was key in the decipherment of cuneiform.

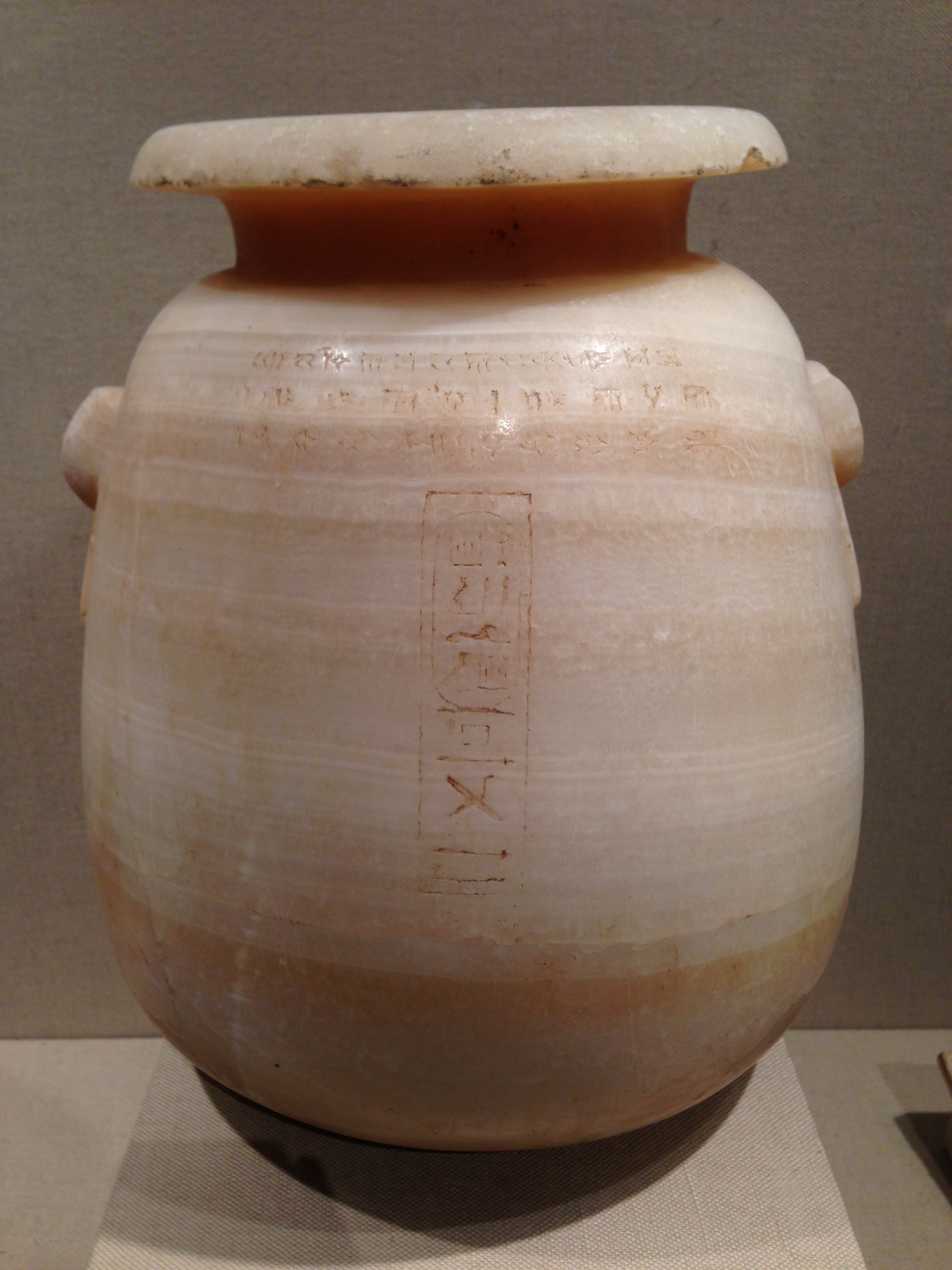
Another jar of Xerxes I, at the Metropolitan Museum of Art.

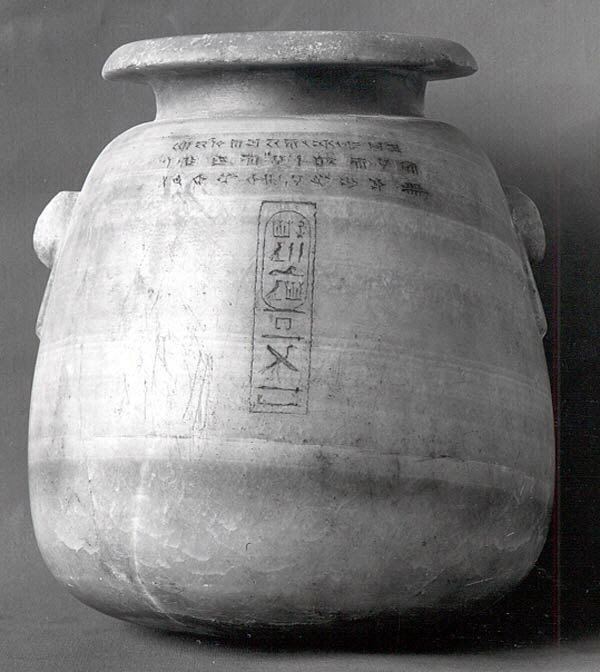
The same jar in black and white photography.

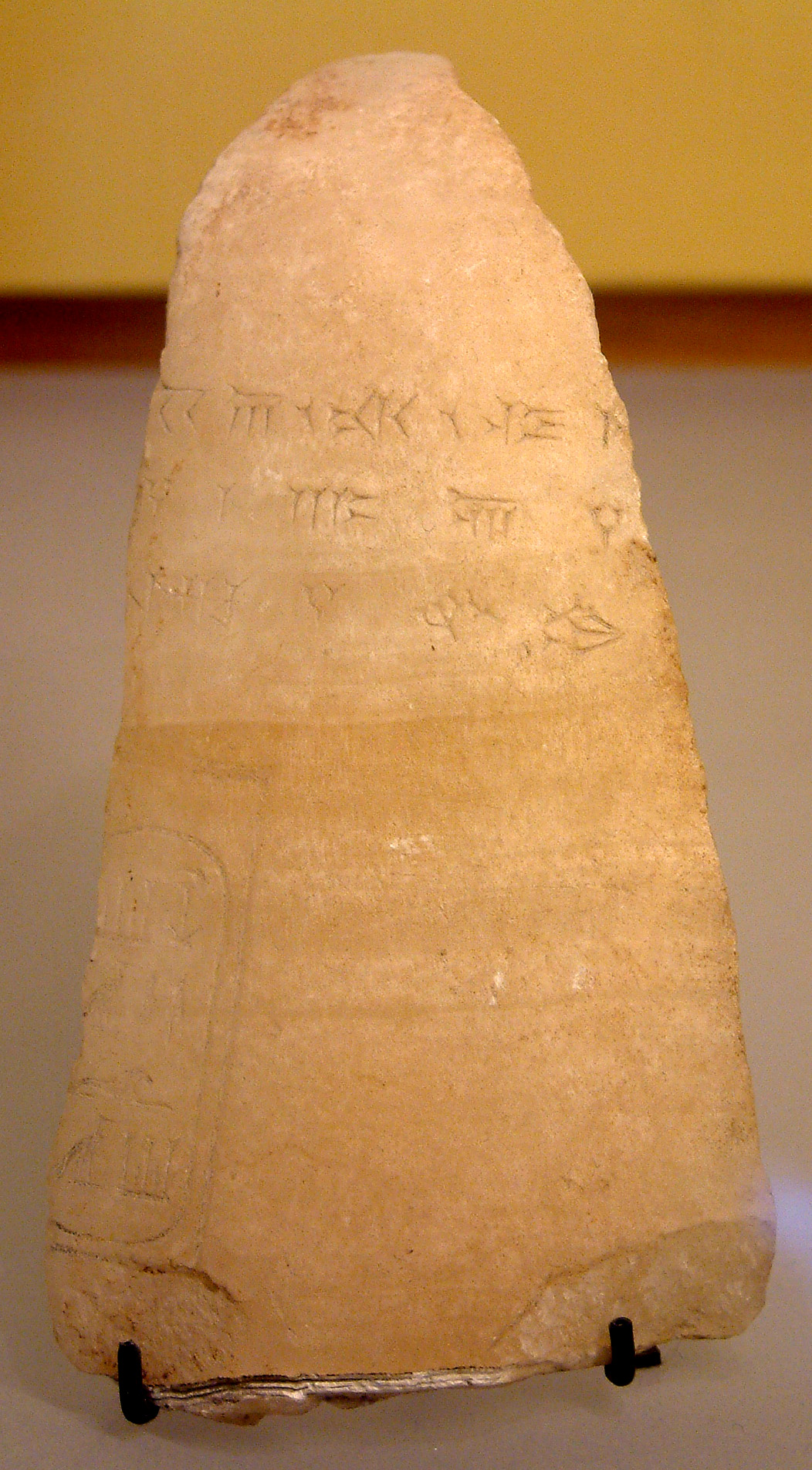
Fragment of a jar of Xerxes I. Louvre Museum

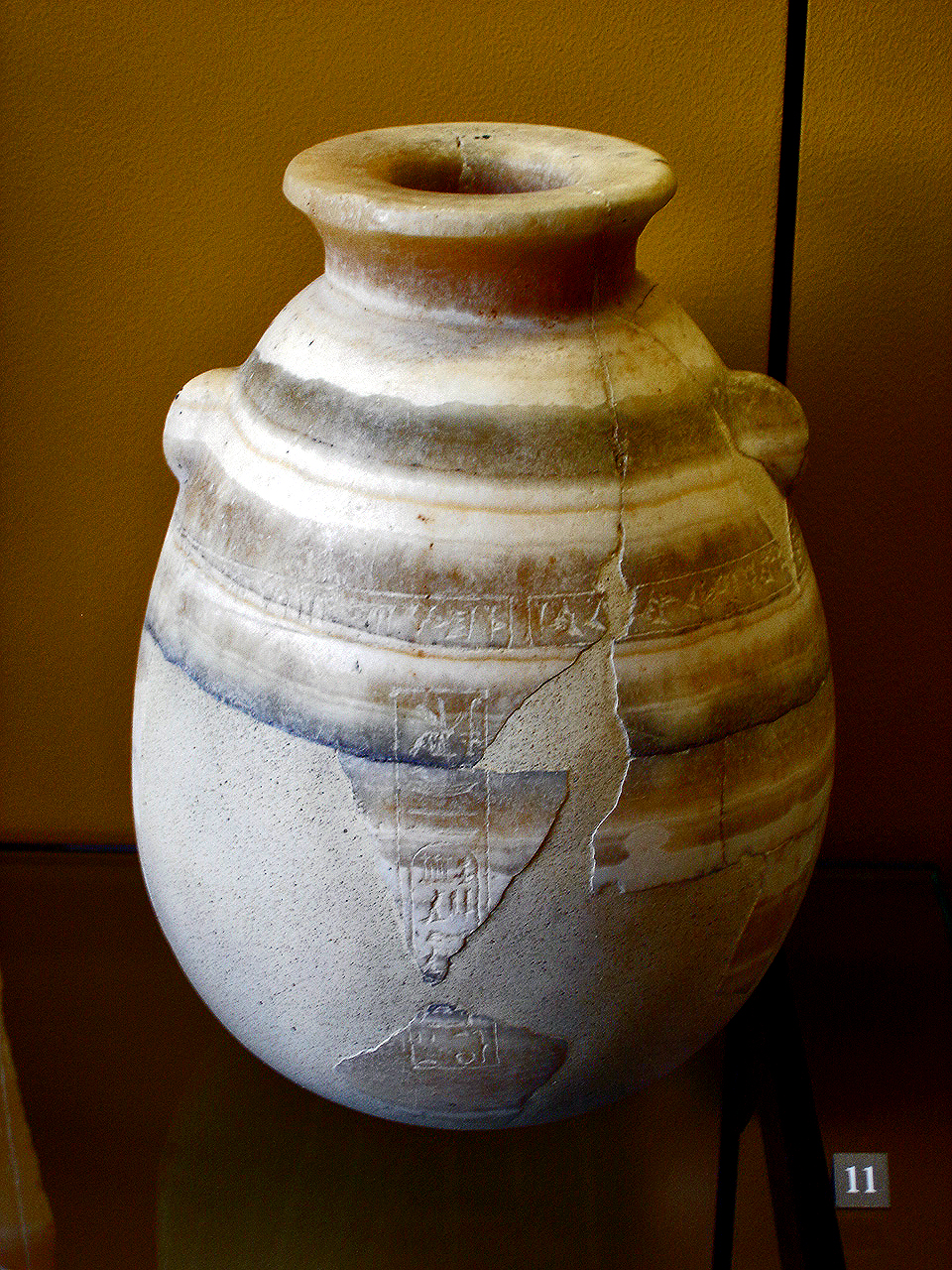
Jar of Xerxes I, year 2. Louvre Museum

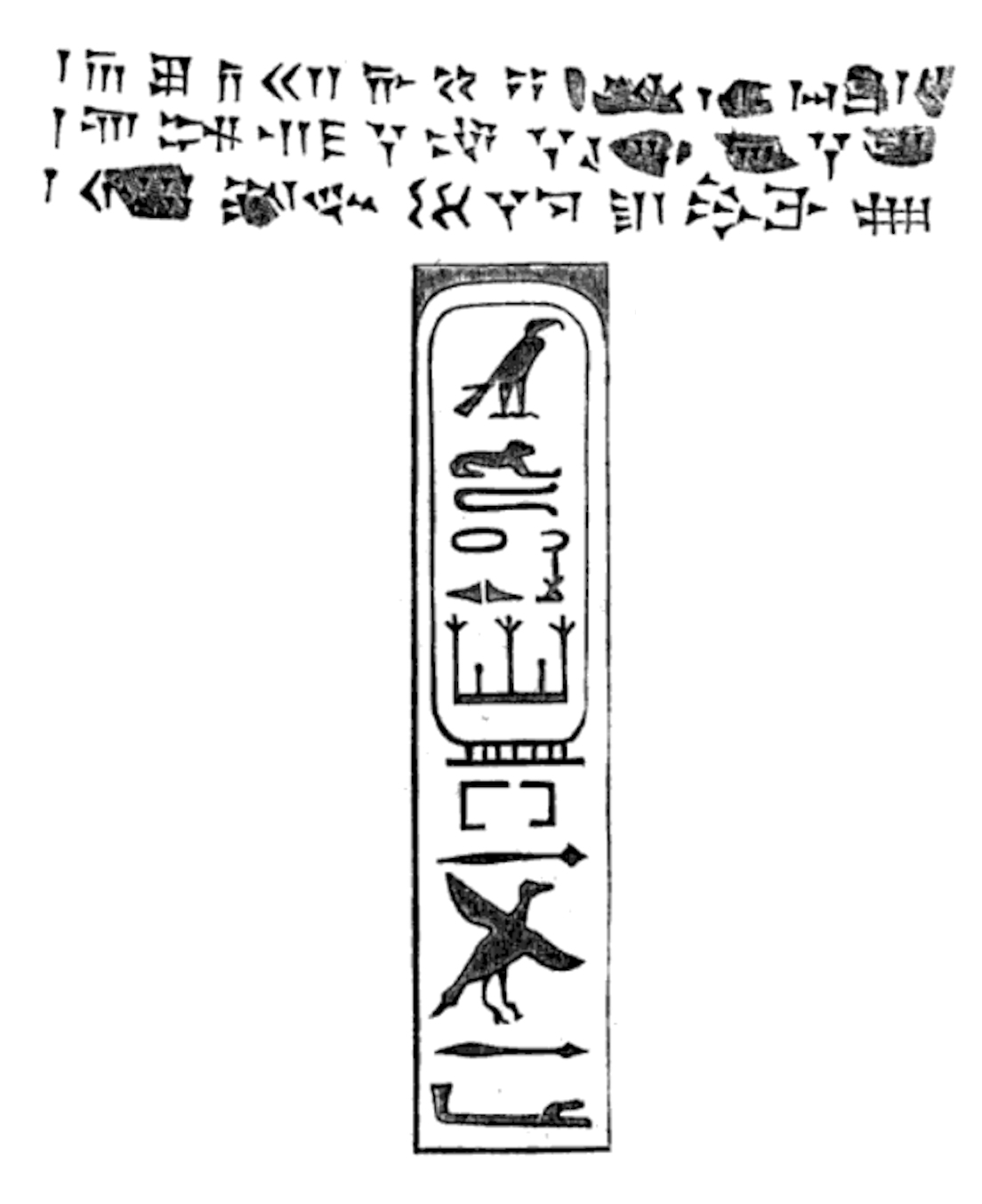
Quadrilingual inscription of Artaxerxes I on an Egyptian alabaster vase.

== See also ==
- History of Achaemenid Egypt
- List of Iranian artifacts abroad
- Yale Babylonian Collection Alabastron Vessel - contemporary vessel of the same era in the Yale Babylonian Collection
