= Mary Hussey =

Mary Hussey may refer to:

- Mary Dudley Hussey (1853–1927), American lawyer, physician, and suffragist
- Mary Inda Hussey (1876–1952), American Assyriologist and professor
