= Yale culinary tablets =

Ancient Babylonian culinary records

The Yale culinary tablets are a collection of four clay tablets containing various ancient Babylonian recipes. Three of the tablets are dated to around 1730 BCE, making them the oldest recipes in the world, while the fourth is dated to the much later Neo-Babylonian period. Presumably, the tablets first found their way in to the Yale collection c. 1911 before starting to be deciphered in 1942.

== History ==
The origin of the tablets and when they were first excavated is unknown, although it is believed that the tablets originally came from southern Mesopotamia. The tablets most likely made their way into the Yale collection in 1911 and they were first labelled in 1933 as "medical" texts. It wasn't until 1943 that the tablets were thoroughly examined by Assyriologist Mary Inda Hussey, with further help from Assyriologist Ferris Stephens and Hittitologist Albrecht Goetze. The tablets first appeared publicly in a 1985 Yale publication by the name of Early Mesopotamian Incantations and Rituals. The tablets were finally translated by French Assyriologist Jean Bottéro for the German encyclopedia of Assyriology Reallexikon der Assyriologie.

== Contents ==
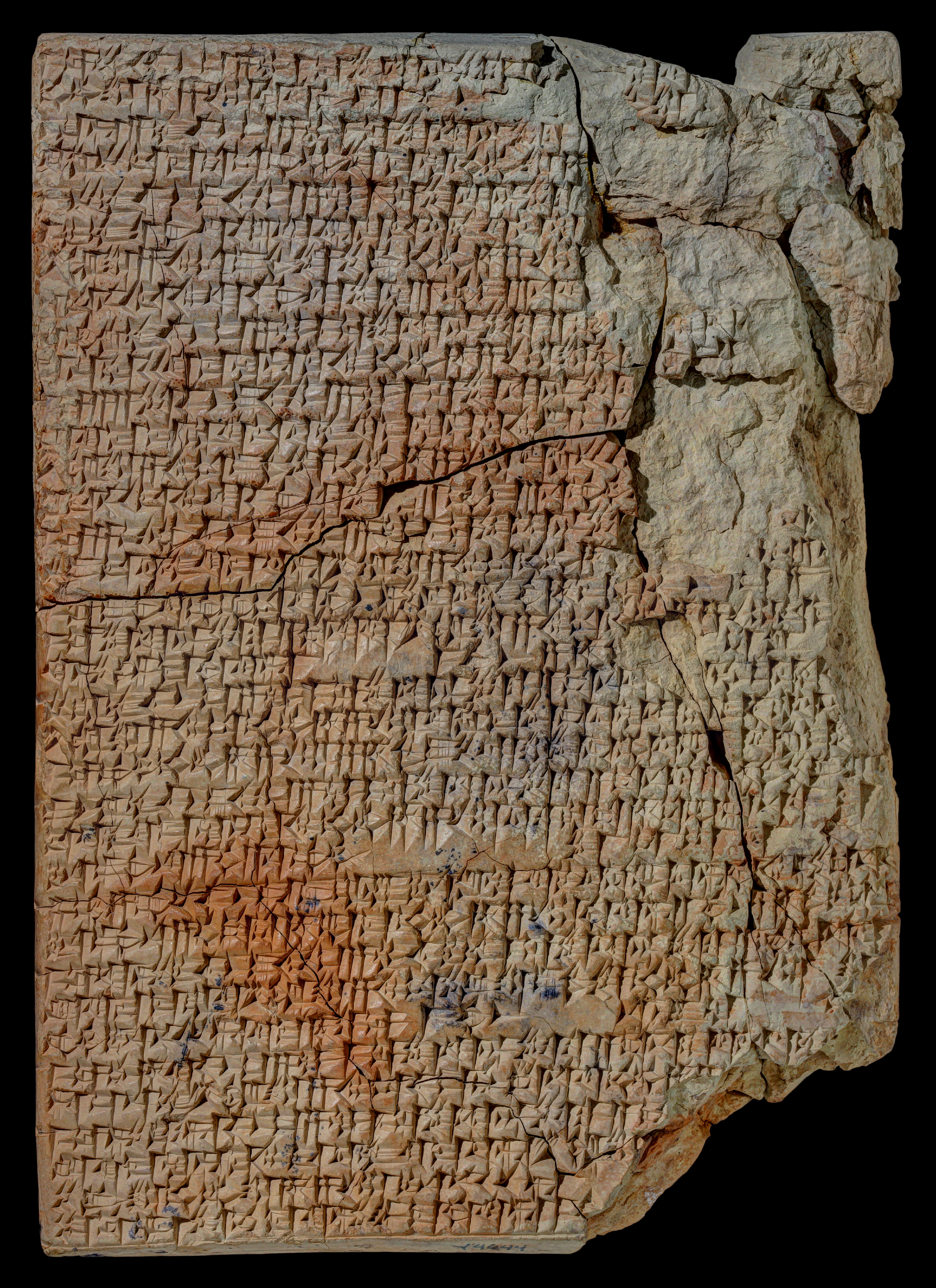
Tablet YBC 4644

The tablets contain dozens of different ingredients dispersed across the tablets, although it has to be noted that no tablet survives in its entirety. The best preserved tablet is YBC 4644 dating from the Old Babylonian Period, which contains the recipes for 25 stews; 21 meat and 4 vegetable stews.

A few example recipes (written in Akkadian) deciphered from tablet YBC 4644 are the following:

Recipe for pašrūtum “Unwinding”:

"Unwinding, Meat is not used, You prepare water, You add fat. (You add) kurrat, cilantro, salt as desired, leek, garlic. You pound up dried sourdough, you sift (it) and you scatter (it) over the pot before removing it".

Recipe for m. puhādi “Stew of Lamb”:

"Stew of lamb. Meat is used. You prepare water. You add fat. You add fine-grained salt, dried barley cakes, onion, Persian shallot, and milk. [You crush] (and add) leek and garlic".

Recipe for m. elamūtum “Elamite Broth”:

"Elamite broth. Meat is not used. You prepare water. You add fat. Dill, kurrat, cilantro, leek, and garlic bound with blood, a corresponding amount of sour milk, and (more) garlic. The (original) name (of the dish) is Zukanda".

Recipe for “Tuh’u”:

"Tuh'u. Leg meat is used. You prepare water. You add fat. You sear. You fold in salt, beer, onion, arugula, cilantro, Persian shallot, cumin, and red(?) beet, and [you crush] leek and garlic. You sprinkle coriander on top. [You add] kurrat and fresh cilantro".
