= Antoine-Jean Saint-Martin =

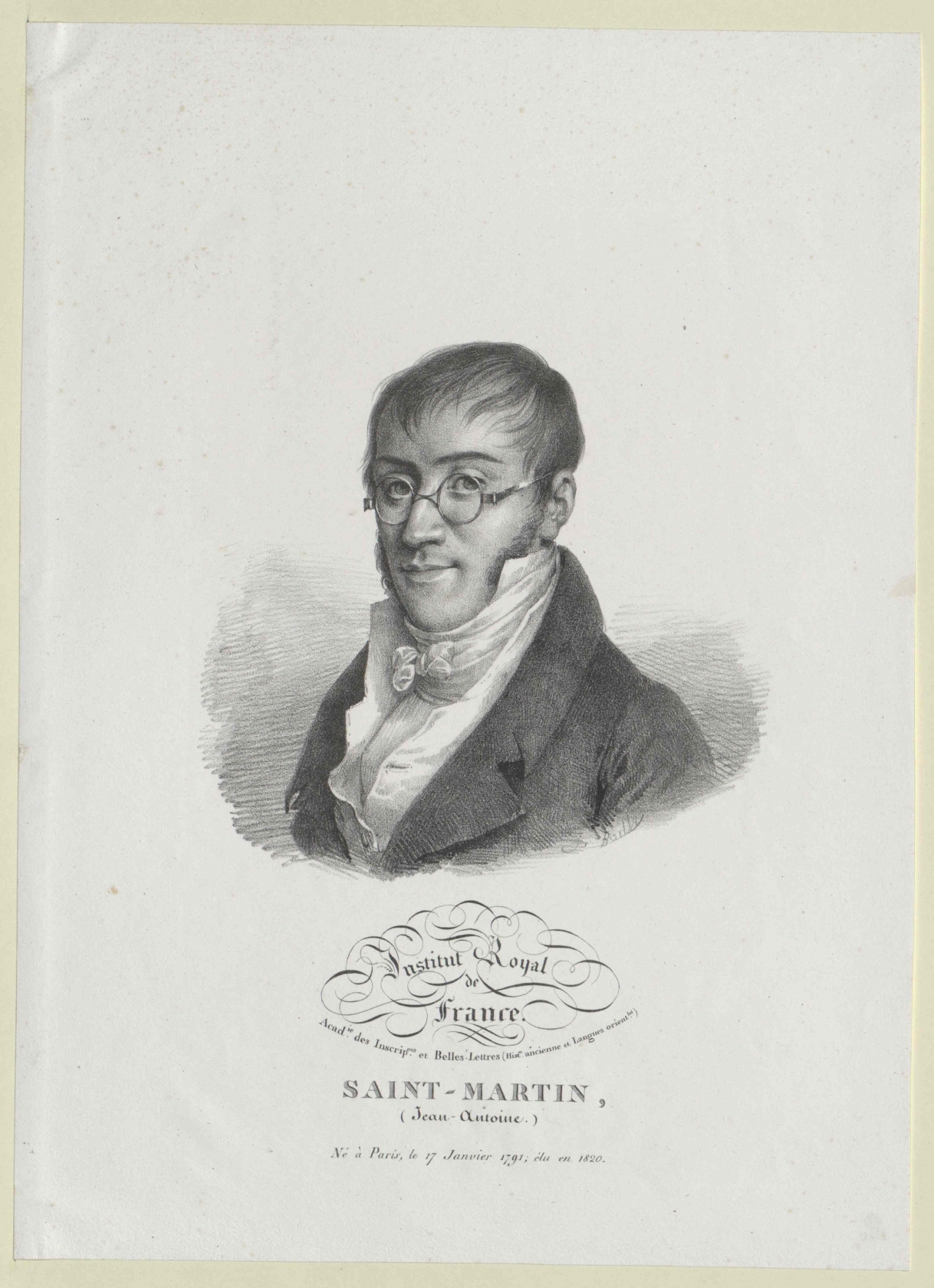
Antoine-Jean Saint-Martin (portrait, 19th century)

Antoine-Jean Saint-Martin (French pronunciation: [ɑ̃twan ʒɑ̃ sɛ̃ maʁtɛ̃]; 17 January 1791 – 17 July 1832) was a French academic, orientalist, and pioneer in the field of what would be known as Armenian Studies.

== Biography ==
Antoine-Jean Saint-Martin was born in Paris on 17 January 1791, the son of a tradesman. Intending to enter commerce, he attended the Collège des Quatre-Nations. There he learned Arabic, Armenian, Persian, Syriac and Turkish, plus the basics of several other languages such as Zend and Georgian. By the age of 20 he had already acquired a solid theory and spoken fluency in Armenian and Arabic.

On 2 September 1820 he was elected a member of the Académie des Inscriptions et Belles-lettres, part of the Institut de France.

In April 1821 he probably was the "Saint Martin" who published the first decipherment of an inscription in the Lycian language.

He later entered the Ministry of Foreign Affairs. In 1822 he was one of the founders of the Société Asiatique, and directed the publication of its journal, the Journal Asiatique. In 1824 he was appointed director of the Bibliothèque de l'Arsenal.

He was responsible for inducing the French government to send the researcher Friedrich Eduard Schulz to the Lake Van region of Armenia in 1827, and in 1828 published Schulz's first report on the remains of the hitherto unknown Urartian civilization.

Saint-Martin died of cholera in Paris on 17 July 1832 during the second pandemic.

=== Contribution to the decipherment of cuneiform ===
The early attempts at deciphering Old Persian cuneiform were made by Münter and Grotefend by guesswork only, using Achaemenid cuneiform inscriptions found in Persepolis. In 1802, Friedrich Münter realized that recurring groups of characters must be the word for "king" (𐎧𐏁𐎠𐎹𐎰𐎡𐎹, now known to be pronounced xšāyaθiya). Georg Friedrich Grotefend extended this work by realizing a king's name is often followed by "great king, king of kings" and the name of the king's father. This, related to the known chronology of the Achaemenid and the relative sizes of each royal names, allowed Grotefend to figure out the cuneiform characters that are part of Darius, Darius's father Hystaspes, and Darius's son Xerxes. Grotefend's contribution to Old Persian is unique in that he did not have comparisons between Old Persian and known languages, as opposed to the decipherment of the Egyptian hieroglyphics and the Rosetta Stone. All his decipherments were done by comparing the texts with known history.

< xA SA i i A rw SA A >
Xerxes (Xašayaruša/Ḫašayaruša)
in hieroglyphs
Era: Late Period
(664–332 BC)

Grotefend published his deductions in 1802, but they were dismissed by the Academic community. It was only in 1823 that Grotefend's discovery was confirmed, when the French archaeologist Champollion, who had just deciphered Egyptian hieroglyphs, had the idea of deciphering the quadrilingual hieroglyph-cuneiform inscription on the famous alabaster vase in the Cabinet des Médailles, the Caylus vase. The Egyptian inscription on the vase turned out to be in the name of King Xerxes I, and Saint-Martin, who accompanied Champollion, was able to confirm that the corresponding words in the cuneiform script (𐎧𐏁𐎹𐎠𐎼𐏁𐎠 𐏐 𐏋 𐏐 𐎺𐏀𐎼𐎣, Xšayāršā : XŠ : vazraka, "Xerxes : The Great King") were indeed using the words which Grotefend had identified as meaning "king" and "Xerxes" through guesswork. The findings were published by A.J. Saint-Martin in Extrait d'un mémoire relatif aux antiques inscriptions de Persépolis lu à l'Académie des Inscriptions et Belles Lettres. Saint-Martin attempted to define an Old Persian cuneiform alphabet, of which 10 letters were correct, on a total of 39 signs he had identified.

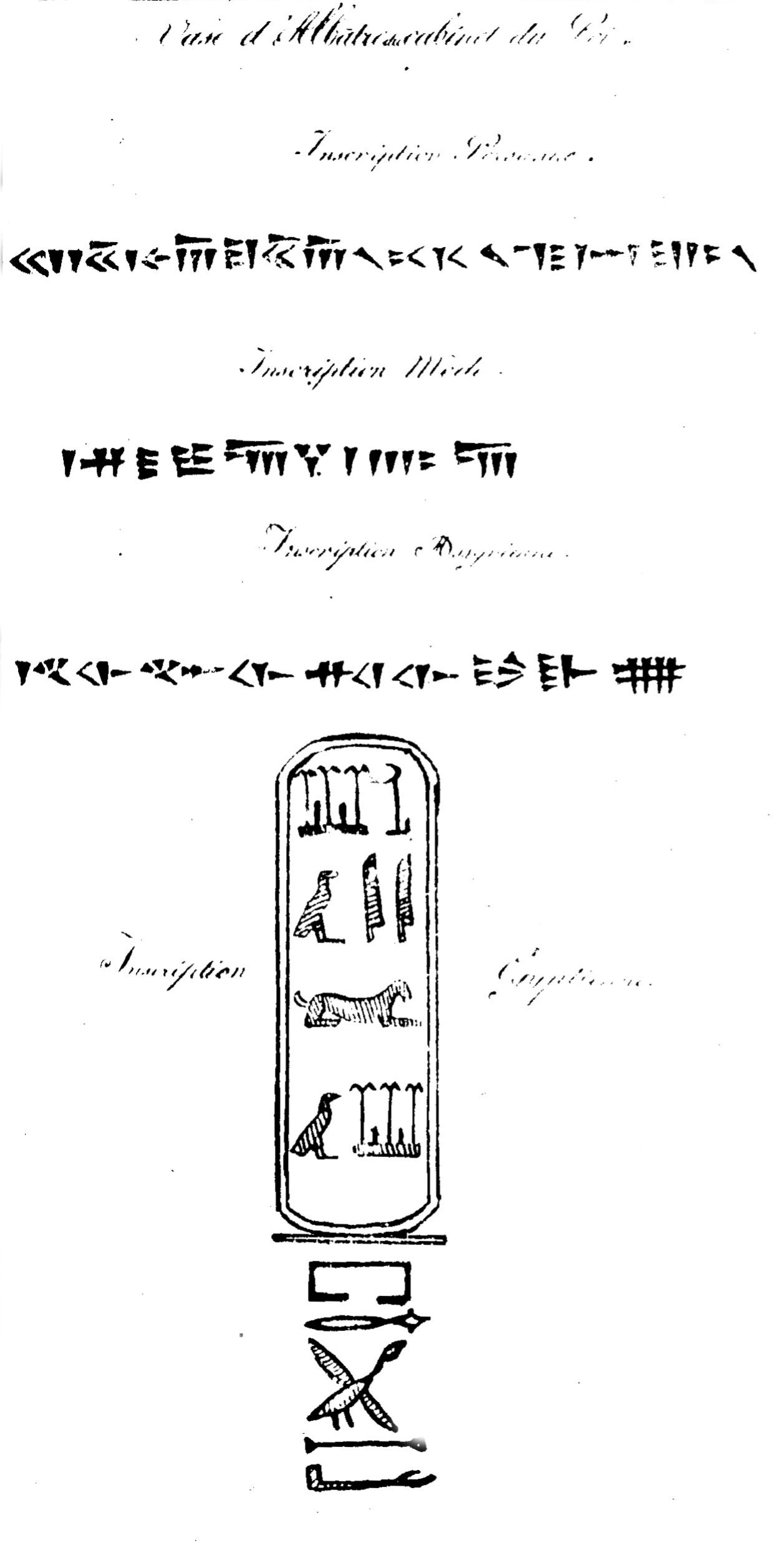
Caylus vase, transcription by Saint-Martin in 1823.

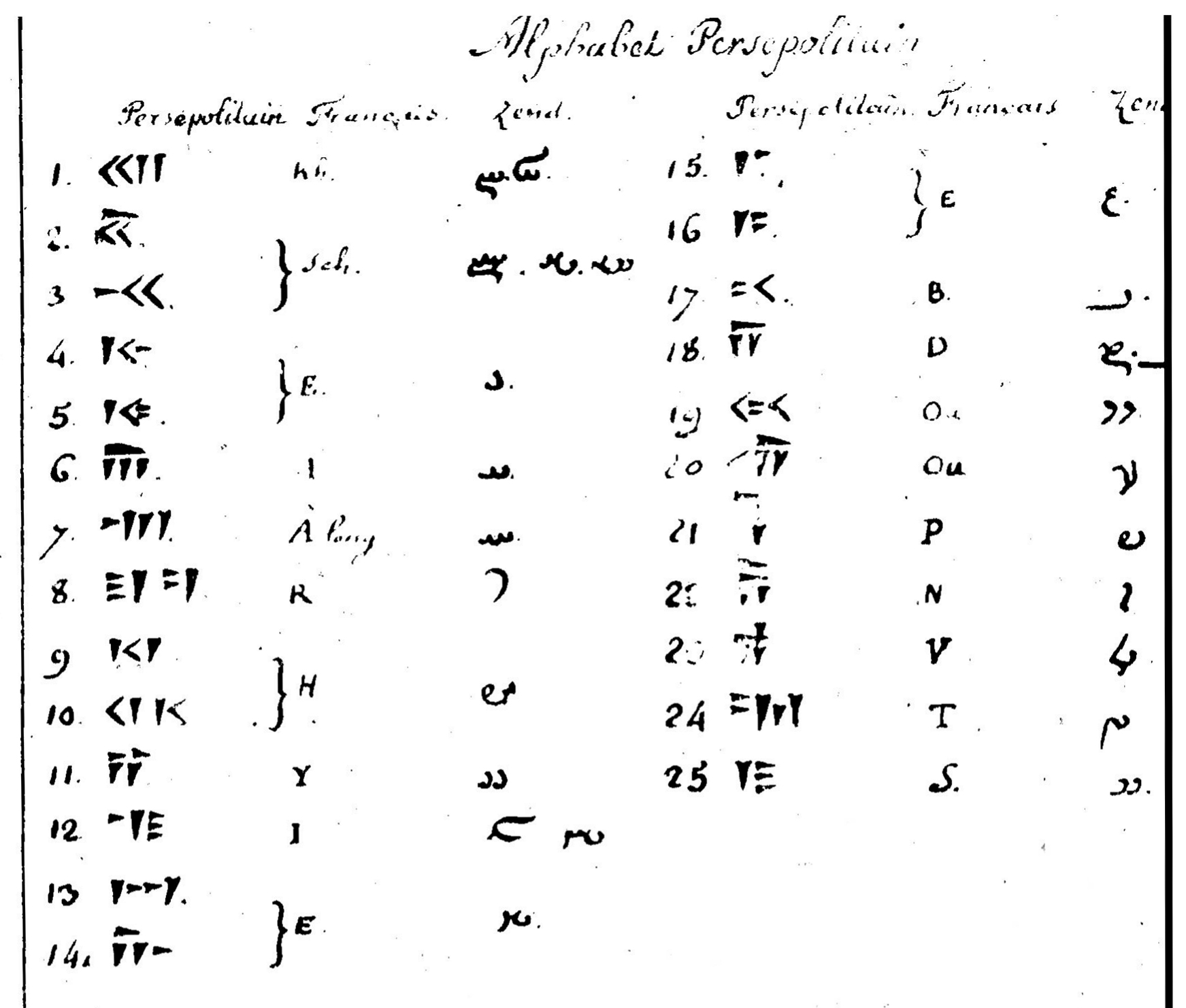
Persepolitan alphabet by Saint-Martin, 1823.

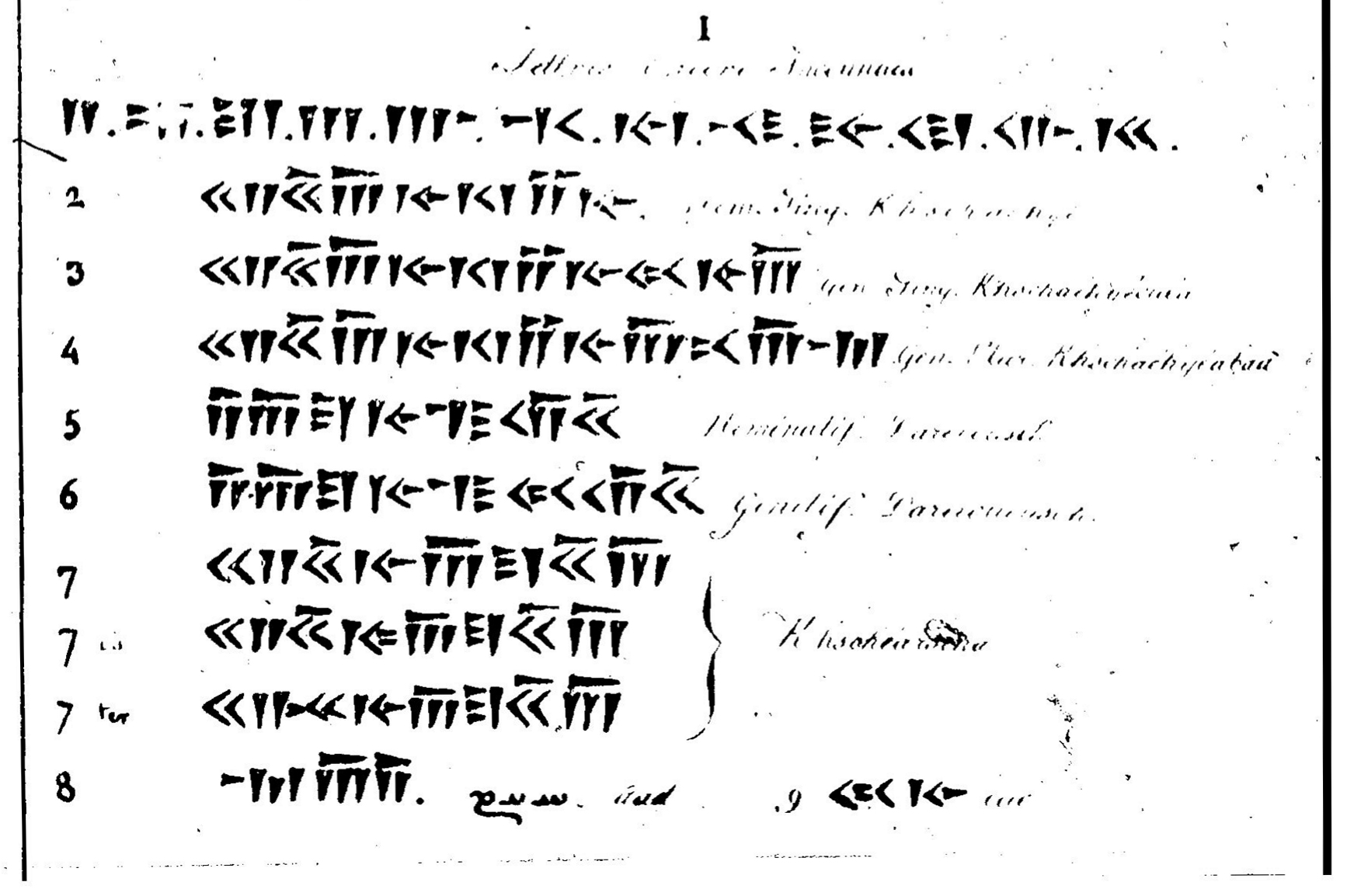
Old Persian cuneiform translation by Saint-Martin, 1823.

== Works ==
- (1818) Mémoires historiques et géographiques sur l'Arménie, 2 vols., Imprimerie royale, Paris.
  - Online: Tome 1, p. PR3, at Google Books, Tome 2, p. PP7, at Google Books
  - Reprint: Nabu Press, 2011.
- (1822) Notice sur le zodiaque de Denderah, p. PA3, at Google Books, Delaunay, 51 p.
- (1822) « Notice sur la vie et les ouvrages de M. Tôchon, p. PR1, at Google Books ». In: Joseph-François Tôchon, Recherches historiques et géographiques sur les médailles des nomes ou préfectures de l'Égypte, Imprimerie royale, 256 p.
- (1823) "Extrait d'un mémoire relatif aux antiques inscriptions de Persépolis lu à l'Académie des Inscriptions et Belles Lettres". Journal asiatique (in French). Société asiatique (France): 65–90. January 1823.
- (1825) Choix de fables de Vartan at Google Books, Paris, Librairie orientale de Dondey-Dupré père et fils; Armenian text, French translation by Antoine-Jean Saint-Martin (in Armenian and French)
- (1827) Relation d'un voyage fait en Europe et dans l'Océan Atlantique, à la fin du XV siècle sous le règne de Charles VIII, par Martyr, évêque d'Arzendjan, translation and introduction by J. Saint-Martin
- (1833) (With Marie-Félicité Brosset) Mémoire sur l'Arménie, 495 p.
- (1838) Recherches sur l'histoire et la géographie de la Mésène et de la Characène at Google Books, Paris, Imprimerie royale
- (1841) Histoire d'Arménie, par le patriarche Jean VI, dit Jean Catholicos (trad.), Paris, Imprimerie royale
- (1850) Fragments d'une histoire des Arsacides, Paris, Imprimerie nationale—Published posthumously by Félix Lajard
  - Tome 1; Tome 2 at Gallica
