= Yale Babylonian Collection Alabastron Vessel =

Egyptian/Persian Vessel with Opiates in held by Yale Babylonian Collection

Yale Babylonian Collection Alabaster Vase
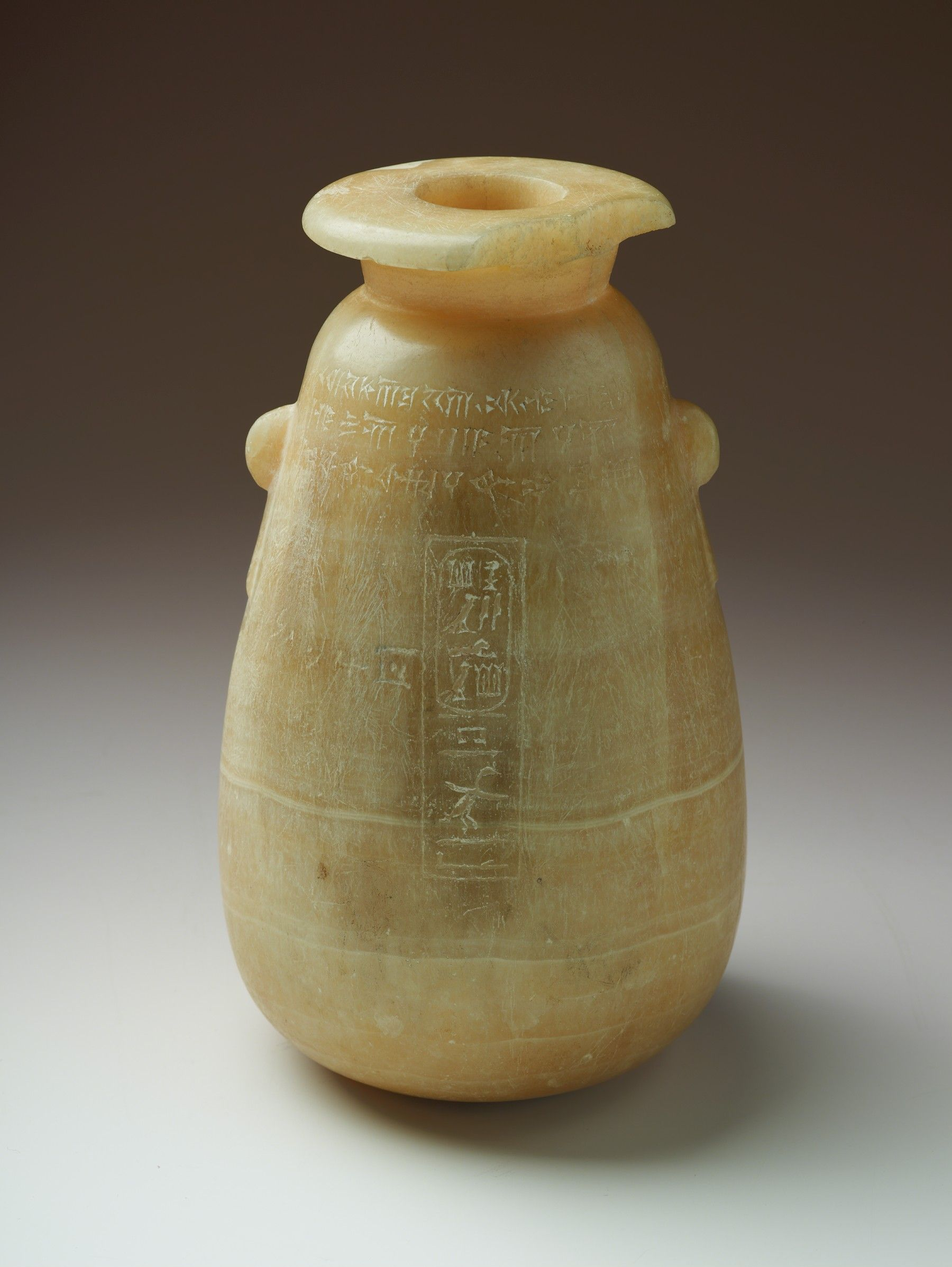
- Height: 22 cm (8.7 in)
- Created: 27th Dynasty
- Period/culture: 486-465 BC
- Place: Yale University
- Present location: Yale Babylonian Collection, Sterling Memorial Library, New Haven, Connecticut
- Culture: Ancient Egyptian, Achaemenid Persia

The YBC Alabastron (Yale Babylonian Collection Alabastron), also known as YBC 02123 (YPM BC 016756) is a quadrilingual Ancient Egyptian alabastron vessel dating to Persian Egypt during the reign of Xerxes I (484-464 BC). Acquired by Yale University's Babylonian Collection in 1912, recent analysis of the vessel's organic residue in 2022-2025 is indicative of opiate residuals, revealing the systemic usage of opium in Egyptian and Achaemenid Persian pharmacology.

== Description ==
Measuring 22 cm in height with a diameter of 8.9 cm, carved in alabaster, scripts in four languages are etched into the vessel, consisting of Old Persian, Elamite, Akkadian, and Egyptian, each inscribed with the title "Xerxes, the Great King". An additional inscription in Demotic script reads "12 kepedj-units", or 1200 mL capacity. It is believed that kepedj is an Egyptian word derived from Persian language. The shape is consistent with Egyptian style and is presumably manufactured in Egypt, but where the subsequent inscriptions were carved remains unknown. Yale acquired the vessel in 1912 in Paris with traceable provenance to Ibrahim Elias Gejou (1868–1942), an Iraqi-French antiquities dealer, with funding financed by J. P. Morgan. Aside from a chip in the lip of the vessel, it is mostly intact.

10 multilingual specimens of this era are known to have survived ranging from finds at the Mausoleum at Halicarnassus to a burial mound in Russia.

== Pharmacology ==
Developments in the study of pharmacology in antiquity often stemmed from texts such as that of the De materia medica by Dioscorides, to the Ebers Papyrus, which has five different recipes involving the usage of opiates. Since 2023, the Yale Ancient Pharmacology Program (YAPP) has conducted research on organic residuals on ancient vessels to study ancient cuisine, medicine, and cosmetics.

In 1933, vessels with aromatic, dark-brown residue were identified in Tutankhamun's tomb at KV62, by Howard Carter's analytical chemist Alfred Lucas. Carter noted that tomb robbers attempted to scrape out the contents of the vessels, and at the time, Lucas was not able to ascertain the specific compounds, though he concluded that they did not contain perfume. Those vessels are currently held by the Grand Egyptian Museum.

In April 2022, ethyl acetate and ethanol were applied to the YBC vessel to extract the organic material. Subjected to gas chromatography–mass spectrometry; noscapine, hydrocotarnine, morphine, thebaine, and papaverine, biomarkers of opium, were identified in the vessel.

The finds are also consistent with vessels excavated in the necropolis at Sedment, now held by the Penn Museum, indicating that opiates are also valued cargo for the afterlife.

== See also ==
- List of Iranian artifacts abroad
