= Mary Inda Hussey =

American Assyriologist and professor

- Born: June 17, 1876; New Vienna, Ohio, United States
- Died: June 20, 1952 (aged 76); Andover, Massachusetts, United States
- Known for: Translation and interpretation of Sumerian and Akkadian texts

Academic background
- Education: Earlham College (B.A.); Bryn Mawr College (Ph.D.)
- Thesis: 'Some Sumerian-Babylonian Hymns of the Berlin Collection' (1906)
- Doctoral advisor: George A. Barton

Academic work
- Institutions: Wellesley College; Mount Holyoke College

Mary Inda Hussey (June 17, 1876 – June 20, 1952) was an American Assyriologist and professor. She taught Biblical studies, Assyriology, and cuneiform at Wellesley College and Mount Holyoke College.

== Early life and education ==
Mary Inda Hussey was born June 17, 1876, in New Vienna, Ohio, to John M and Ann Hussey. Raised in a Quaker family, her father was the co-editor of the Quaker Magazine, The Christian Worker. Throughout her life, Hussey identified as a pacifist and was active in the Society of Friends.

Hussey moved with her family to Richmond, Indiana in 1890, where she obtained a Bachelor of Arts degree at Earlham College. She continued her studies at Bryn Mawr College focusing on Assyriology and cuneiform. She became interested in Biblical studies when, according to an article in the Boston Transcript in 1924, she "desired to solve for herself the problems that confronted her when she tried to reconcile the lessons she was learning in college, as to evolution and science, and those the Church had taught."

Before obtaining her PhD in 1906 from Bryn Mawr under the supervision of George A. Barton, she undertook graduate work alongside the leading researchers in her field. She studied at the University of Pennsylvania where Morris Jastrow Jr., Hermann Volrath Hilprecht and Albert Tobias Clay were faculty members, before attending the University of Berlin, where Friedrich Delitzsch was a lecturer, and continuing on to the University of Leipzig where she studied with Heinrich Zimmern.

Her doctoral thesis was titled Some Sumerian-Babylonian Hymns of the Berlin Collection and appeared in a 1907 edition of the American Journal of Semitic Languages and Literatures. At the time, she was one of only small group (five, by some estimates) of women to have degrees in Assyriology.

== Teaching career ==
In 1907, Hussey accepted a position at Wellesley College where she taught biblical history until 1909. In 1910 she received a Baltimore Fellowship which allowed her to begin work deciphering Sumerian tablets at the Harvard Semitic Museum in Cambridge, Massachusetts. The work was extended for another year when she was named an Alice Freeman Palmer fellow by Wellesley College. During the same period she worked as an assistant at the Museum. Her time at the Museum coincided with the tenure of founding curator David Gordon Lyon.

Hussey began working at the Mount Holyoke College in 1913 when she was appointed to the Department of Biblical History and Literature. From 1914 to 1917, Hussey was associate professor at Mount Holyoke, and the following academic year she was granted tenure. That Hussey's teaching abilities matched her research skills is attested in a letter home dated to 1929, by one of her students, in which she comments that Hussey "is an excellent teacher." In a document by the Mount Holyoke Press Bureau in 1942, the Academic Dean of Mount Holyoke College said of Hussey, "One of her greatest satisfactions she finds in her students, whose work has been a rich reward." During a leave of absence in 1931, Hussey served as annual professor at the American Center of Oriental Research in Jerusalem. She had served as field secretary for the organization for fourteen years and was the first woman invited to act as annual professor. Hussey retired from the College in 1941 and went on to teach classes at Wellesley College.

Over the course of her career, Hussey lectured on a number of subjects, but continued to actively pursue her work regarding the translation and interpretation of Sumerian texts and tablets. Of the 96 texts that appeared the Early Mesopotamian Incantations and Rituals, 29 were copied by Hussey during the 1920s. She continued her research well past retirement, having nearly completed a volume of Akkadian tablets held in Yale Babylonian Collection at the time of her death.

In 1924, in response to the Boston Transcript reporter's question of whether her research had helped her to reconcile science and technology on one hand with Christian teachings on the other, Hussey answered: “The line along which we have to develop is the line of good will. Mechanical contrivances have been brought to such a pass that if this is not balanced by development along higher lines, there is nothing left to us but the things we saw in the "Great War," applying our wits to the blowing out of men's brains. One sees, the more one studies deeply, that all nations of old following this process, succeeded only in defeating their own ends.” She uses as examples the ancient Sumerian city of Telloh and the Assyrian Empire, concluding that "it will be the story of every age . . . until we realize the need of developing good will."

== Death and legacy ==
Hussey died June 20, 1952, in Andover, Massachusetts, due to complications from a heart condition while attending the annual meeting of the New England Society of Friends. She was remembered in an obituary by The New York Times as "a linguist of note" who was known for "digging up, translating and analyzing the most ancient written records."

While not much is known about Hussey's personal life, Harriet M. Allyn, Academic Dean of Mount Holyoke College in 1942, described Hussey as: “Any alumna returning to South Hadley may have the good luck to find [Hussey], the gracious hostess and good story teller, surrounded by her colonial furniture and oriental treasures in the charming old house which she has remodeled, up at the turn of Morgan Road. There she will greet you and tell you of her adventures, and there she will give you her philosophy of the ever ancient and ever modern "the line along which we have to develop is the line of good will.""

== Bibliography ==
- Hussey, Mary Inda (1 January 1901). "A Supplement to Brünnow's Classified List of Cuneiform Ideographs". Journal of the American Oriental Society. 22: 201–220. doi:10.2307/592429. JSTOR 592429.
- Hussey, Mary Inda (1 January 1907). "Some Sumerian-Babylonian Hymns of the Berlin Collection". The American Journal of Semitic Languages and Literatures. 23 (2): 142–176. doi:10.1086/369586. hdl:2027/mdp.39015030576816. S2CID 170893577.
- Hussey, Mary Inda (1 January 1913). "Tablets from Dréhem in the Public Library of Cleveland, Ohio". Journal of the American Oriental Society. 33: 167–179. doi:10.2307/592823. JSTOR 592823.
- Hussey, Mary Inda (1 January 1916). "A Conveyance of Land Dated in the Reign of Ellil-bâni". Journal of the American Oriental Society. 36: 34–36. doi:10.2307/592667. JSTOR 592667.
