= Yale Babylonian Collection =

Collection of ancient Near-Eastern works

Coordinates: 41.3112°N 72.9281°W

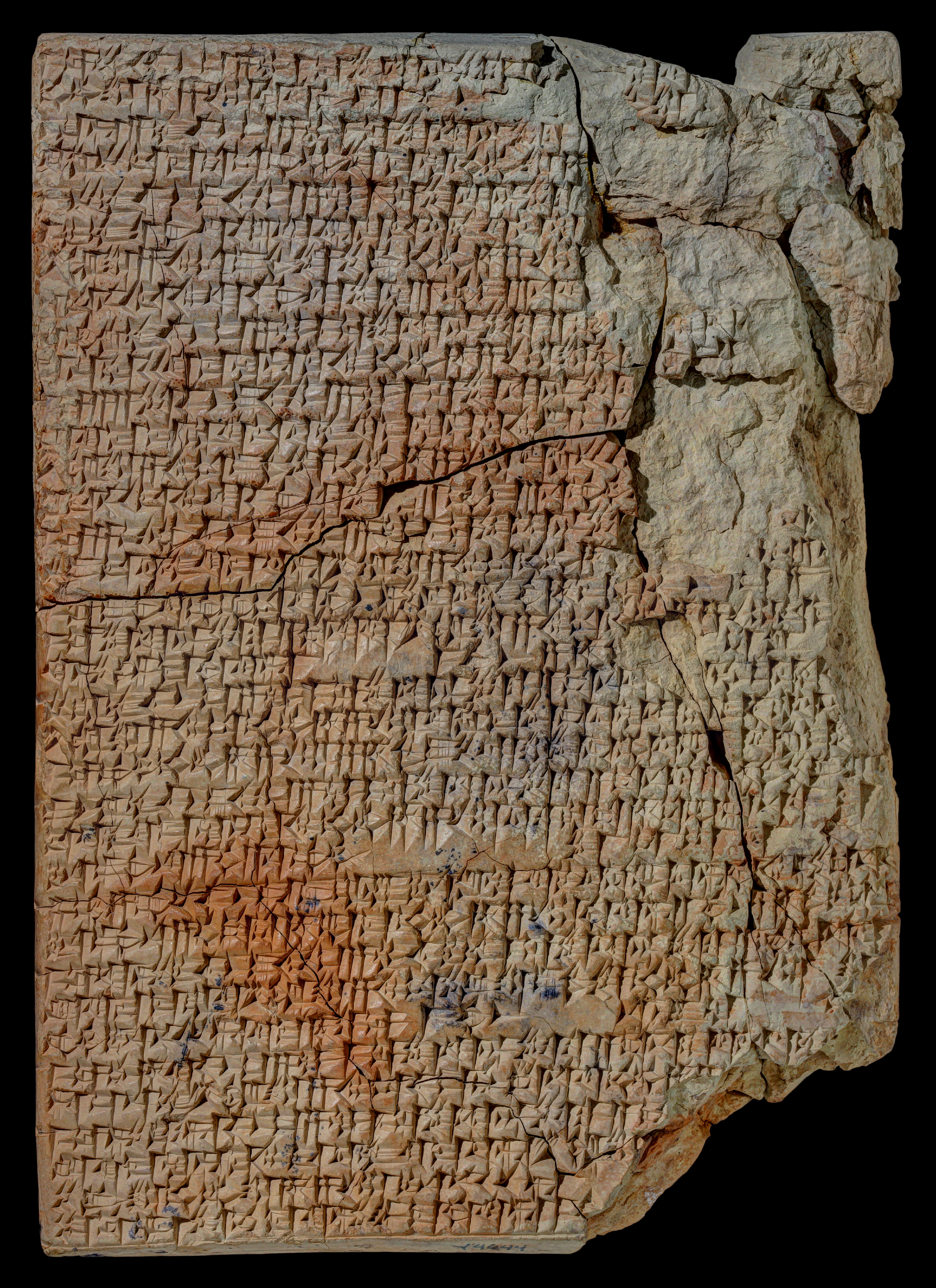
Cuneiform text containing culinary recipes dating to the Old Babylonian period (c. 1900–1600 BCE), YBC 4644, obverse

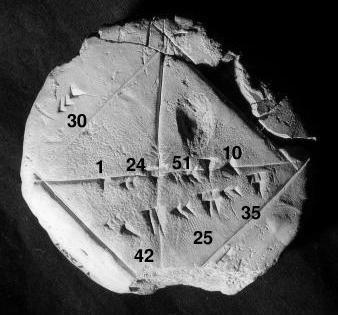
The collection holds Babylonian clay tablet YBC 7289 (c. 1800–1600 BC). The tablet displays an approximation of the square root of 2.

Comprising some 45,000 items, the Yale Babylonian Collection is an independent branch of the Yale University Library housed on the Yale University campus in Sterling Memorial Library at New Haven, Connecticut, United States. In 2017, the collection was affiliated to the Peabody Museum of Natural History.

Established by the donation of a collection of cuneiform tablets by J. P. Morgan in 1909, the Collection is now home to one of the largest collections of ancient Near Eastern writing in America and ranks among the best repositories of its kind in the world. Beyond the ongoing study and conservation of its own holdings, the Yale Babylonian Collection stands as an important center for innovative research in Assyriology and other related fields. Since 2019 all cuneiform artifacts as well as cylinder and stamp seals are being digitized. These digital assets will be freely available in a number of online repositories.

The collection contains over 1,300 private and official letters that span several different time periods in Babylonian history. Several of these letters were still sealed in their clay envelopes to only be opened and read for the first time when they entered the collection.

The collection is open on weekdays by appointment.

Among the highlights of the collection are several tablets dating to the first half of the second millennium BCE, which contain culinary recipes.

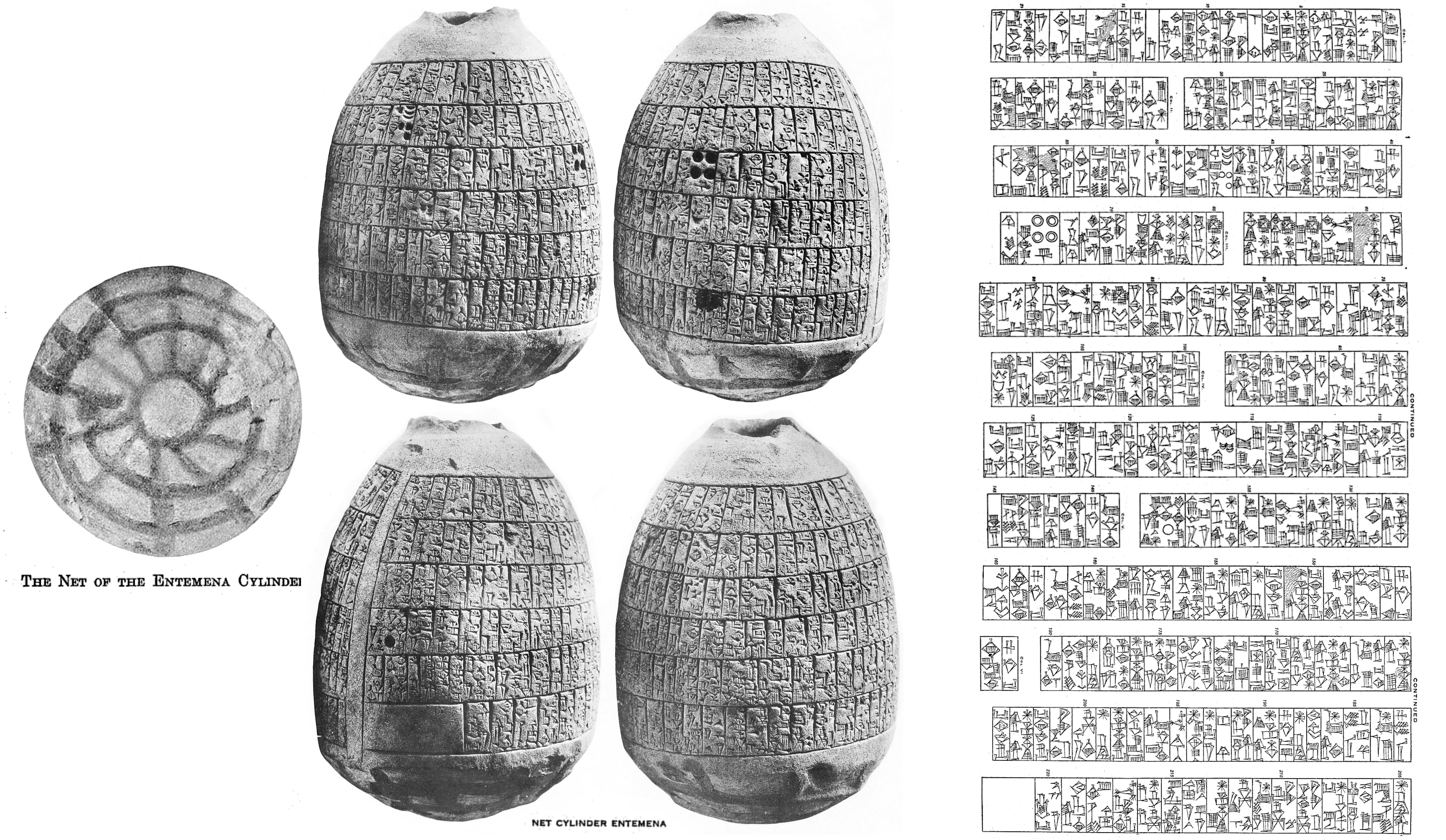
"Net cylinder" of Entemena, the second known cylinder describing the border conflict between Lagash and Umma, circa 2500 BCE.

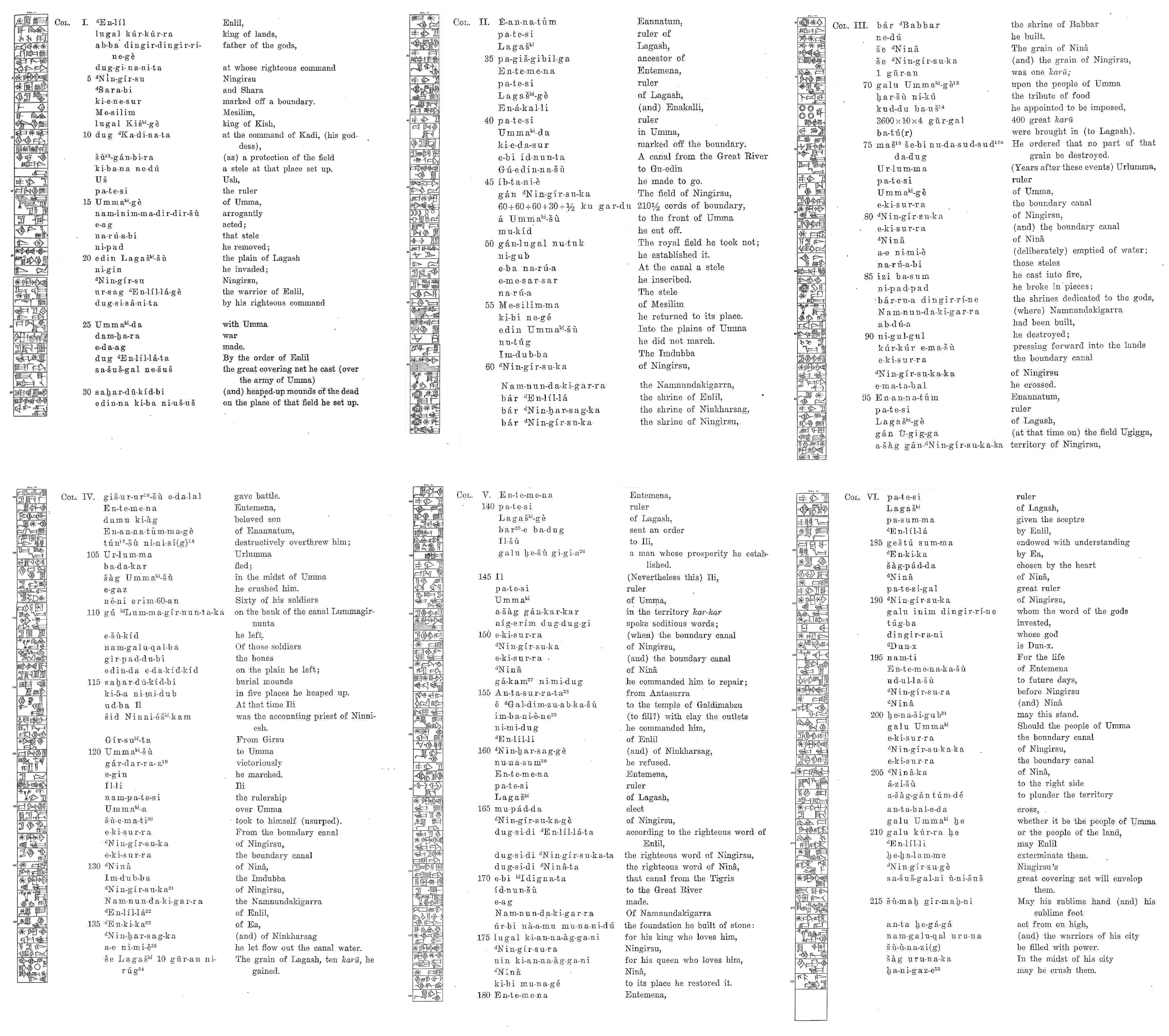
Full text of the War inscription by Entemena, in the Net Cylinder

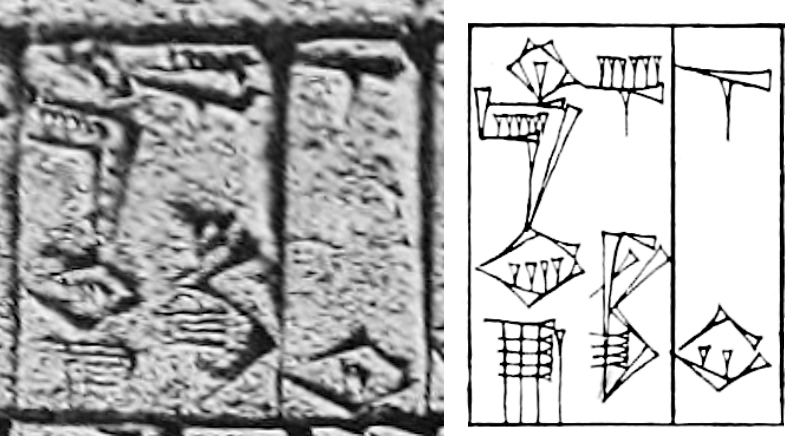
Mesilim Lugal Kish-ki (𒈨𒁲 𒈗 𒆧𒆠), "Mesilim, King of Kish", on the "Net Cylinder" of Entemena

== See also ==
- YBC 2123 - a Persian-Egyptian alabaster vessel in the collection identified to have opiate residuals
- YBC 7289
