= Decipherment of cuneiform =

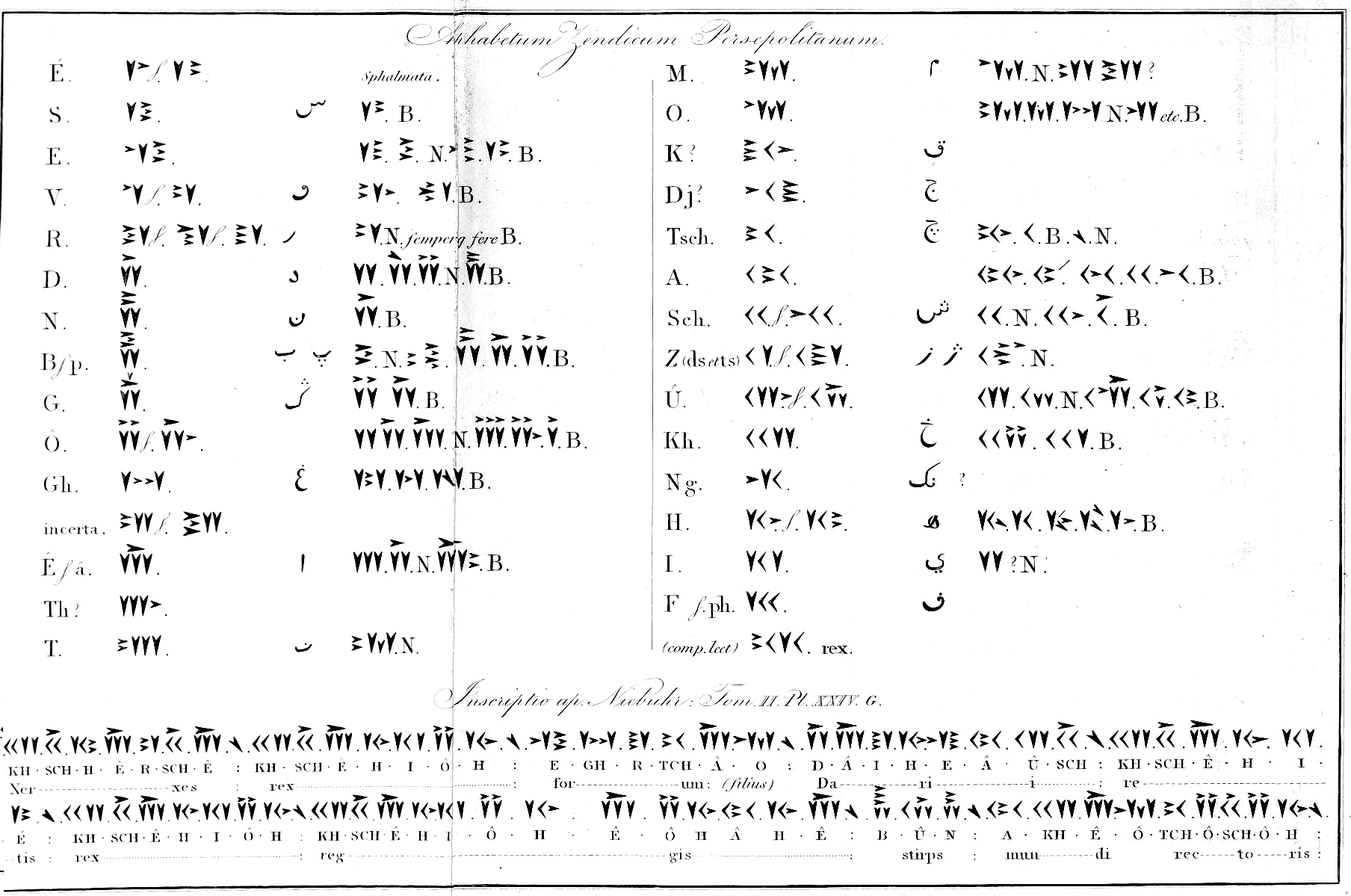
Old Persian alphabet, and proposed transcription of the Xerxes inscription, according to Georg Friedrich Grotefend. Initially published in 1815. Grotefend only identified correctly eight letters among the thirty signs he had collated.

The decipherment of cuneiform began with the decipherment of Old Persian cuneiform between 1802 and 1836.

The first cuneiform inscriptions published in modern times were copied from the Achaemenid royal inscriptions in the ruins of Persepolis, with the first complete and accurate copy being published in 1778 by Carsten Niebuhr. Niebuhr's publication was used by Grotefend in 1802 to make the first breakthrough – the realization that Niebuhr had published three different languages side by side and the recognition of the word "king".

The rediscovery and publication of cuneiform took place in the early 17th century, and early conclusions were drawn such as the writing direction and that the Achaemenid royal inscriptions are three different languages (with two different scripts). In 1620, García de Silva Figueroa dated the inscriptions of Persepolis to the Achaemenid period, identified them as Old Persian, and concluded that the ruins were the ancient residence of Persepolis. In 1621, Pietro della Valle specified the direction of writing from left to right. In 1762, Jean-Jacques Barthélemy found that an inscription in Persepolis resembled that found on a brick in Babylon. Carsten Niebuhr made the first copies of the inscriptions of Persepolis in 1778 and settled on three different types of writing, which subsequently became known as Niebuhr I, II and III. He was the first to discover the sign for a word division in one of the scriptures. Oluf Gerhard Tychsen was the first to list 24 phonetic or alphabetic values for the characters in 1798.

Actual decipherment did not take place until the beginning of the 19th century, initiated by Georg Friedrich Grotefend in his study of Old Persian cuneiform. He was followed by Antoine-Jean Saint-Martin in 1822 and Rasmus Christian Rask in 1823, who was the first to decipher the name Achaemenides and the consonants m and n. Eugène Burnouf identified the names of various satrapies and the consonants k and z in 1833–1835. Christian Lassen contributed significantly to the grammatical understanding of the Old Persian language and the use of vowels. The decipherers used the short trilingual inscriptions from Persepolis and the inscriptions from Ganjnāme for their work.

In a final step, the decipherment of the trilingual Behistun inscription was completed by Henry Rawlinson and Edward Hincks. Edward Hincks discovered that Old Persian is partly a syllabary.

== Early knowledge ==
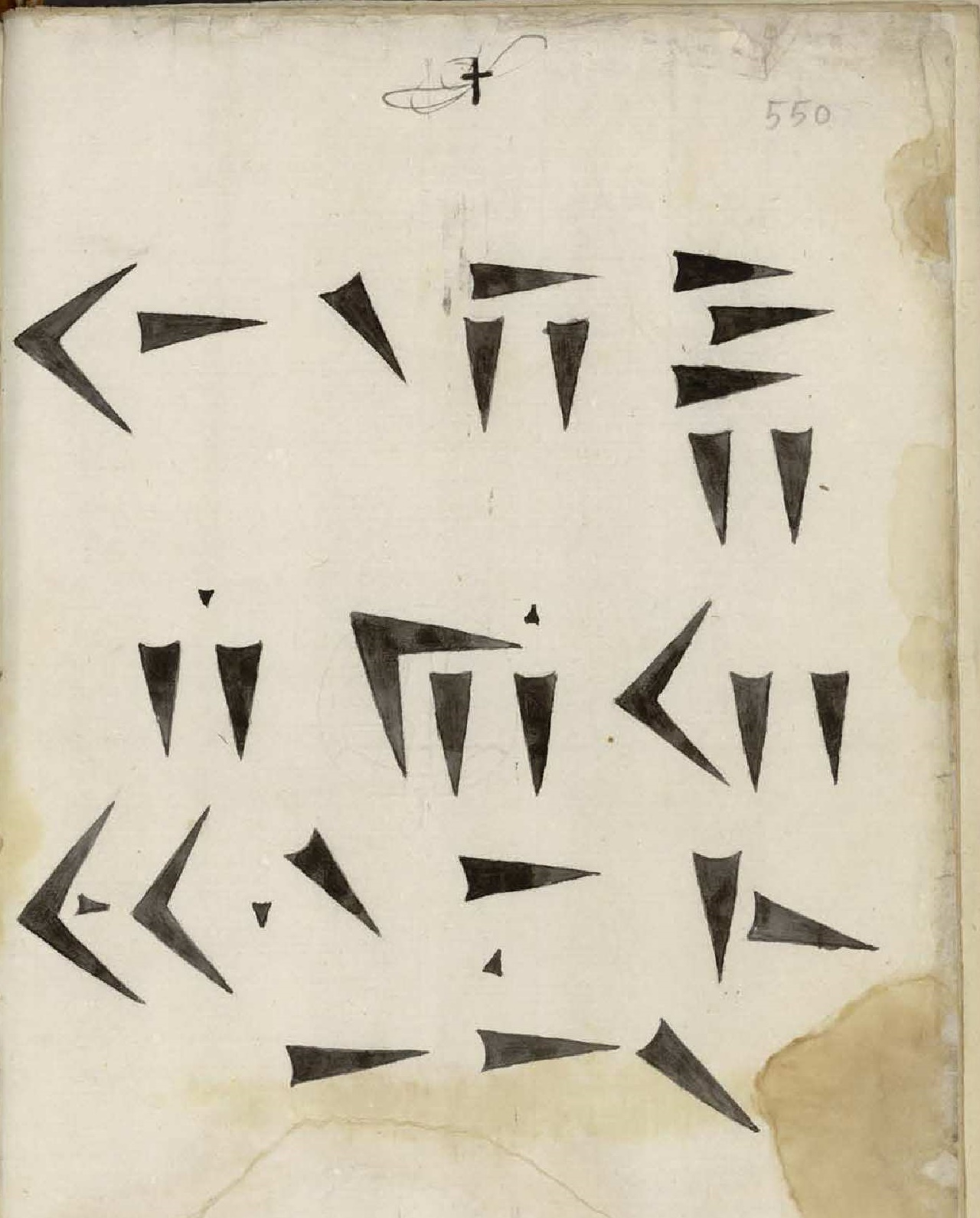
García de Silva Figueroa (1620)

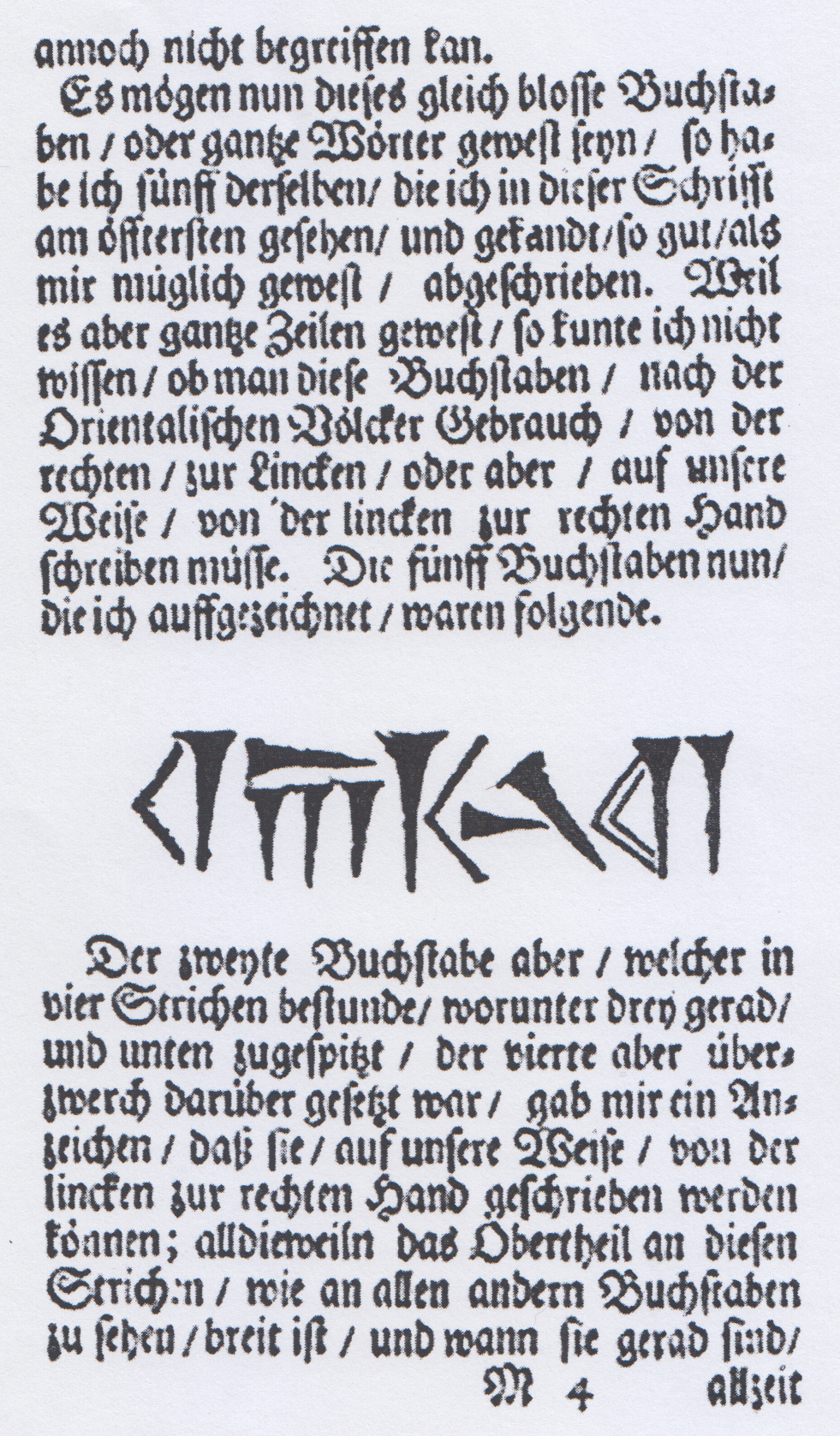
Pietro Della Valle (1621)

The first cuneiform inscriptions published in modern times, both copied from Achaemenid royal inscriptions in Persepolis in the early 17th century. Pietro Della Valle's inscription, today known as XPb, is from the Palace of Xerxes.

For centuries, travelers to Persepolis, located in Iran, had noticed carved cuneiform inscriptions and were intrigued. Attempts at deciphering Old Persian cuneiform date back to Arabo-Persian historians of the medieval Islamic world, though these early attempts at decipherment were largely unsuccessful.

In the 15th century, the Venetian Giosafat Barbaro explored ancient ruins in the Middle East and came back with news of a very odd writing he had found carved on the stones in the temples of Shiraz and on many clay tablets.

Antonio de Gouvea, a professor of theology, noted in 1602 the strange writing he had seen during his travels a year earlier in Persia. In 1625, the Roman traveler Pietro Della Valle, who had sojourned in Mesopotamia between 1616 and 1621, brought to Europe copies of characters he had seen in Persepolis and inscribed bricks from Ur and the ruins of Babylon. The copies he made, the first that reached circulation within Europe, were not quite accurate, but Della Valle understood that the writing had to be read from left to right, following the direction of wedges. However, he did not attempt to decipher the scripts.

Englishman Sir Thomas Herbert, in the 1638 edition of his travel book Some Yeares Travels into Africa & Asia the Great, reported seeing at Persepolis carved on the wall "a dozen lines of strange characters...consisting of figures, obelisk, triangular, and pyramidal" and thought they resembled Greek. In the 1677 edition he reproduced some and thought they were 'legible and intelligible' and therefore decipherable. He also guessed, correctly, that they represented not letters or hieroglyphics but words and syllables, and were to be read from left to right.

In 1700 Thomas Hyde first called the inscriptions "cuneiform", but deemed that they were no more than decorative friezes.

Proper attempts at deciphering Old Persian cuneiform started with faithful copies of cuneiform inscriptions, which first became available in 1711 when duplicates of Darius's inscriptions were published by Jean Chardin.

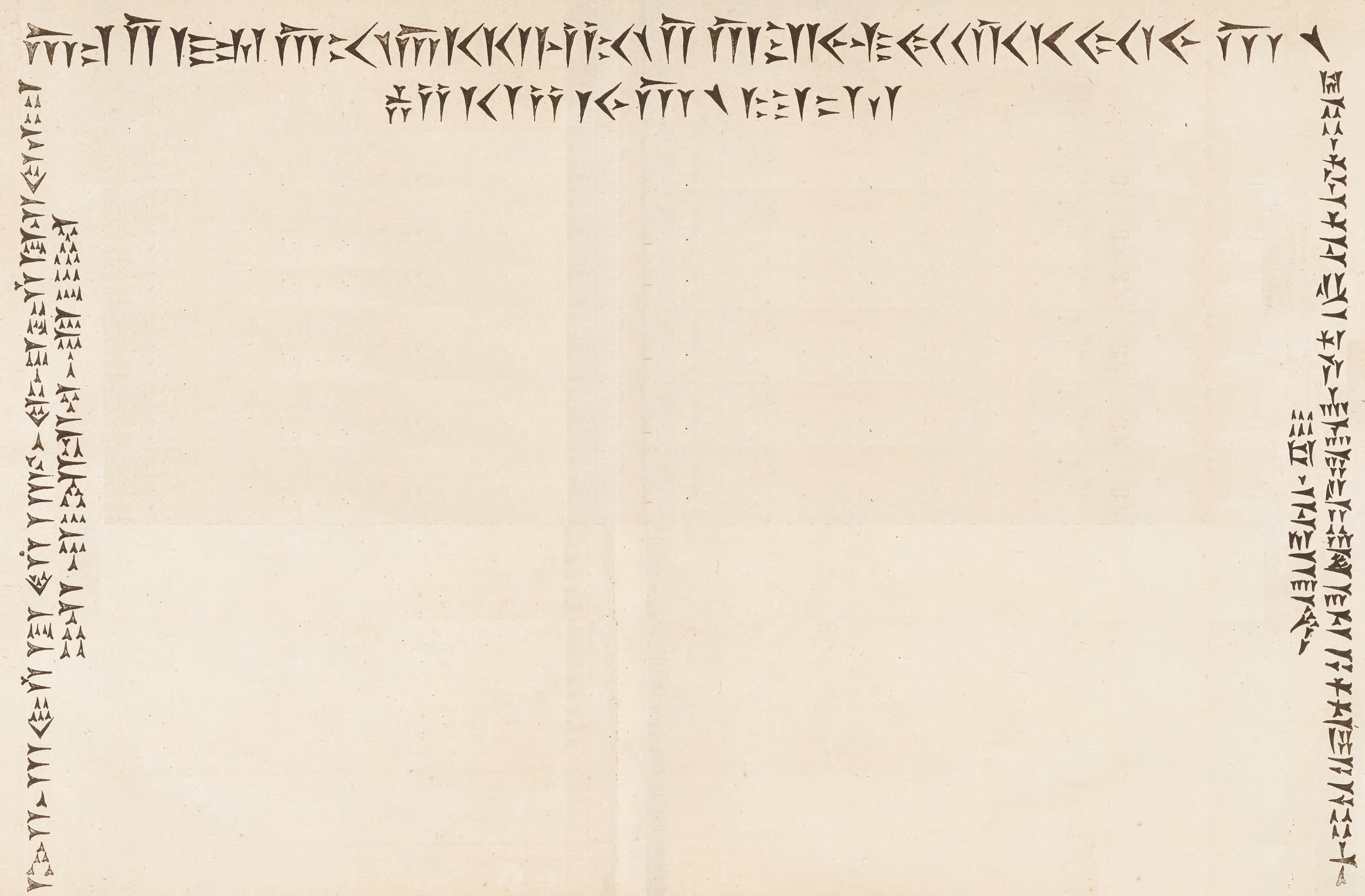
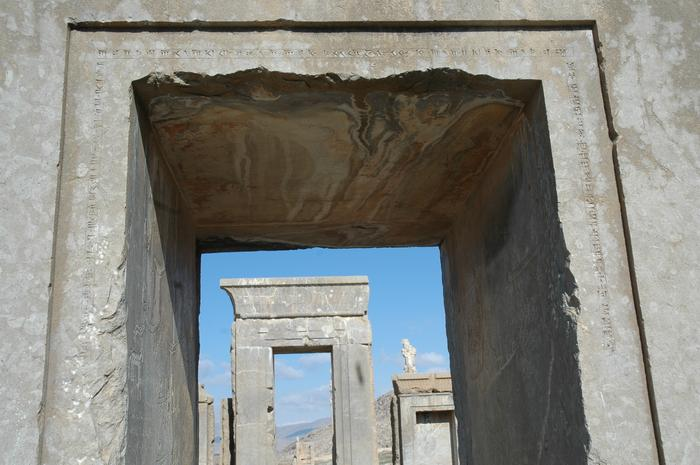
Cuneiform inscriptions recorded by Jean Chardin in the ruins of the Palace of Darius, Persepolis in 1674. The Achaemenid royal inscription, today known as DPc, is in three languages: the top is Old Persian cuneiform, the left is Elamite cuneiform, and the right is Babylonian.

== Old Persian cuneiform: deduction of the word for "King" (circa 1800) ==
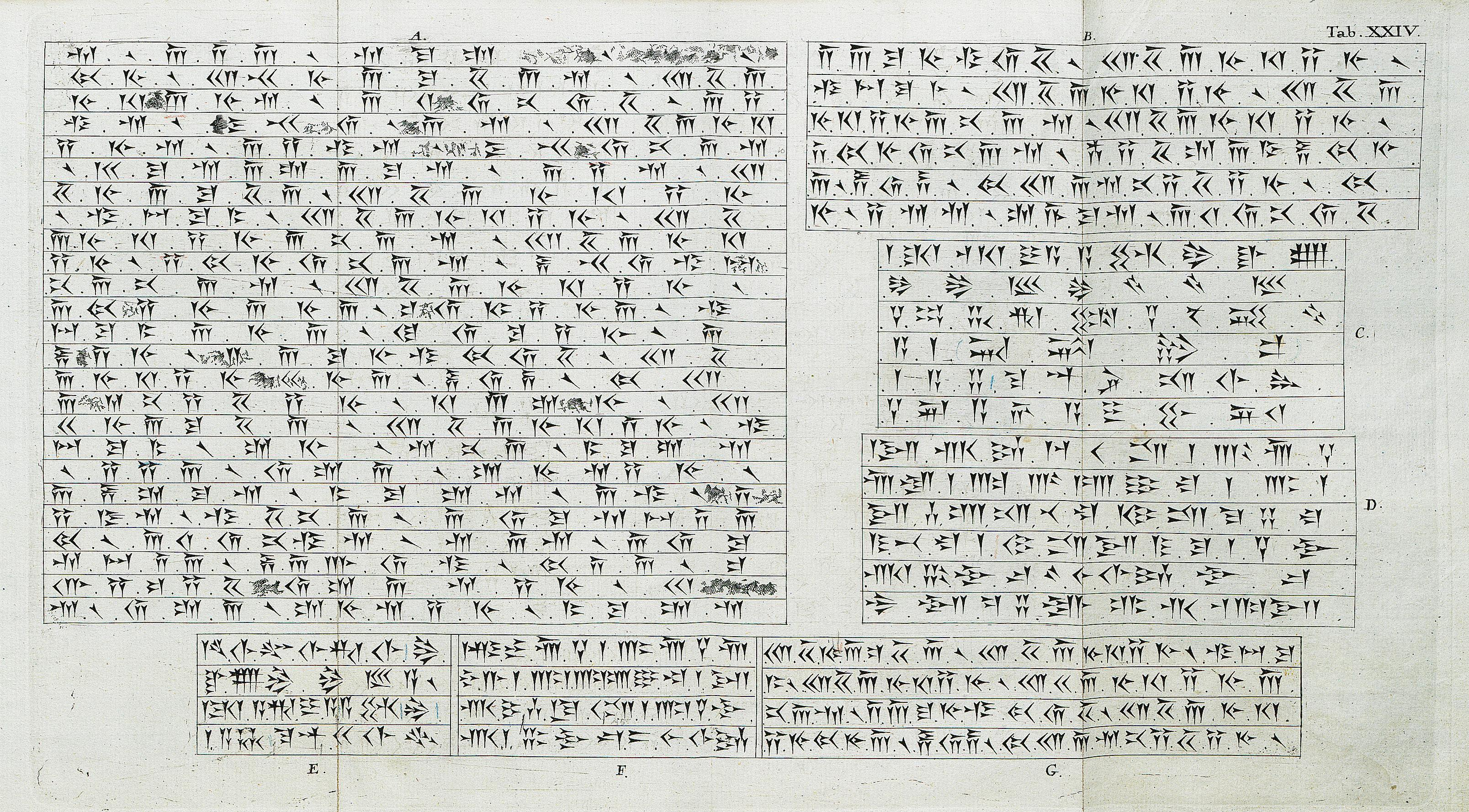
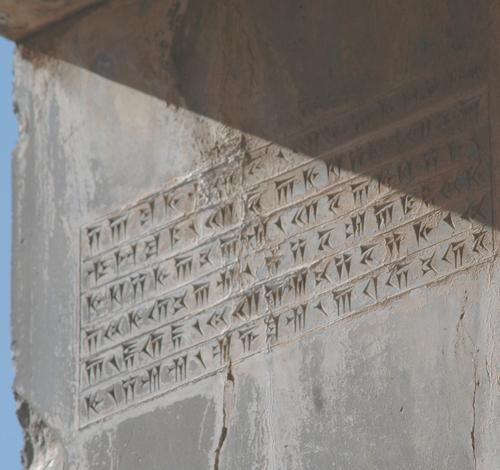
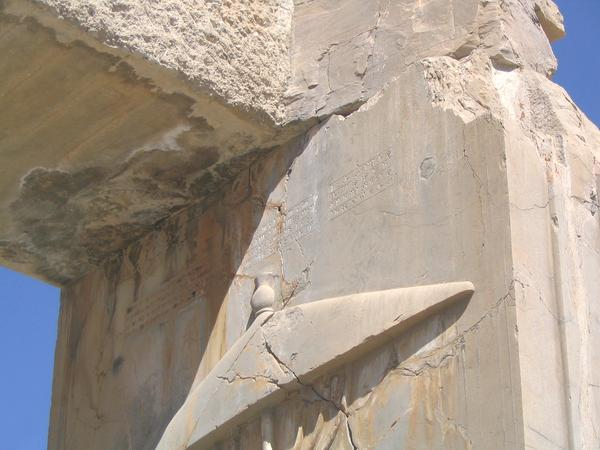
Niebuhr's publications of Achaemenid royal inscriptions in Persepolis, and modern photos of the originals, today known as DPa and XPe, from the Palaces of Darius and Xerxes.

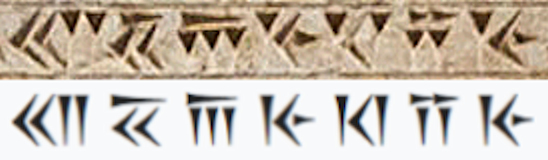
This Old Persian cuneiform sign sequence, because of its numerous occurrences in inscriptions, was correctly guessed by Münter as being the word for "King". This word is now known to be pronounced xšāyaθiya in Old Persian (𐎧𐏁𐎠𐎹𐎰𐎡𐎹), and indeed means "King".

Carsten Niebuhr brought very complete and accurate copies of the inscriptions at Persepolis to Europe, published in 1767 in Reisebeschreibungen nach Arabien ("Account of travels to Arabia and other surrounding lands"). The set of characters that would later be known as Old Persian cuneiform, was soon perceived as being the simplest of the three types of cuneiform scripts that had been encountered, and because of this was understood as a prime candidate for decipherment (the two other, older and more complicated scripts were Elamite and Babylonian). Niebuhr realized that there were only 42 characters in the simpler category of inscriptions, which he named "Class I", and affirmed that this must therefore be an alphabetic script.

At about the same time, Anquetil-Duperron came back from India, where he had learnt Pahlavi and Persian under the Parsis, and published in 1771 a translation of the Zend Avesta, thereby making known Avestan, one of the ancient Iranian languages. With this basis, Antoine Isaac Silvestre de Sacy was able to start the study of Middle Persian in 1792–93, during the French Revolution, and he realized that the inscriptions of Naqsh-e Rostam had a rather stereotyped structure on the model: "Name of the King, the Great King, the King of Iran and Aniran, son of N., the Great King, etc...". He published his results in 1793 in Mémoire sur diverses antiquités de la Perse.

In 1798, Oluf Gerhard Tychsen made the first study of the inscriptions of Persepolis copied by Niebuhr. He discovered that series of characters in the Persian inscriptions were divided from one another by an oblique wedge (𐏐) and that these must be individual words. He also found that a specific group of seven letters (𐎧𐏁𐎠𐎹𐎰𐎡𐎹) was recurring in the inscriptions, and that they had a few recurring terminations of three to four letters. However, Tychsen mistakenly attributed the texts to Arsacid kings, and therefore was unable to make further progress.

Friedrich Münter, Bishop of Copenhagen, improved over the work of Tychsen, and proved that the inscriptions must belong to the age of Cyrus and his successors, which led to the suggestion that the inscriptions were in the Old Persian language and probably mentioned Achaemenid kings. He suggested that the long word appearing with high frequency and without any variation towards the beginning of each inscription (𐎧𐏁𐎠𐎹𐎰𐎡𐎹) must correspond to the word "King", and that repetitions of this sequence must mean "King of Kings". He correctly guessed that the sequence must be pronounced kh-sha-a-ya-th-i-ya, a word of the same root as the Avestan xšaΘra- and the Sanskrit kṣatra- meaning "power" and "command", and now known to be pronounced xšāyaθiya in Old Persian.

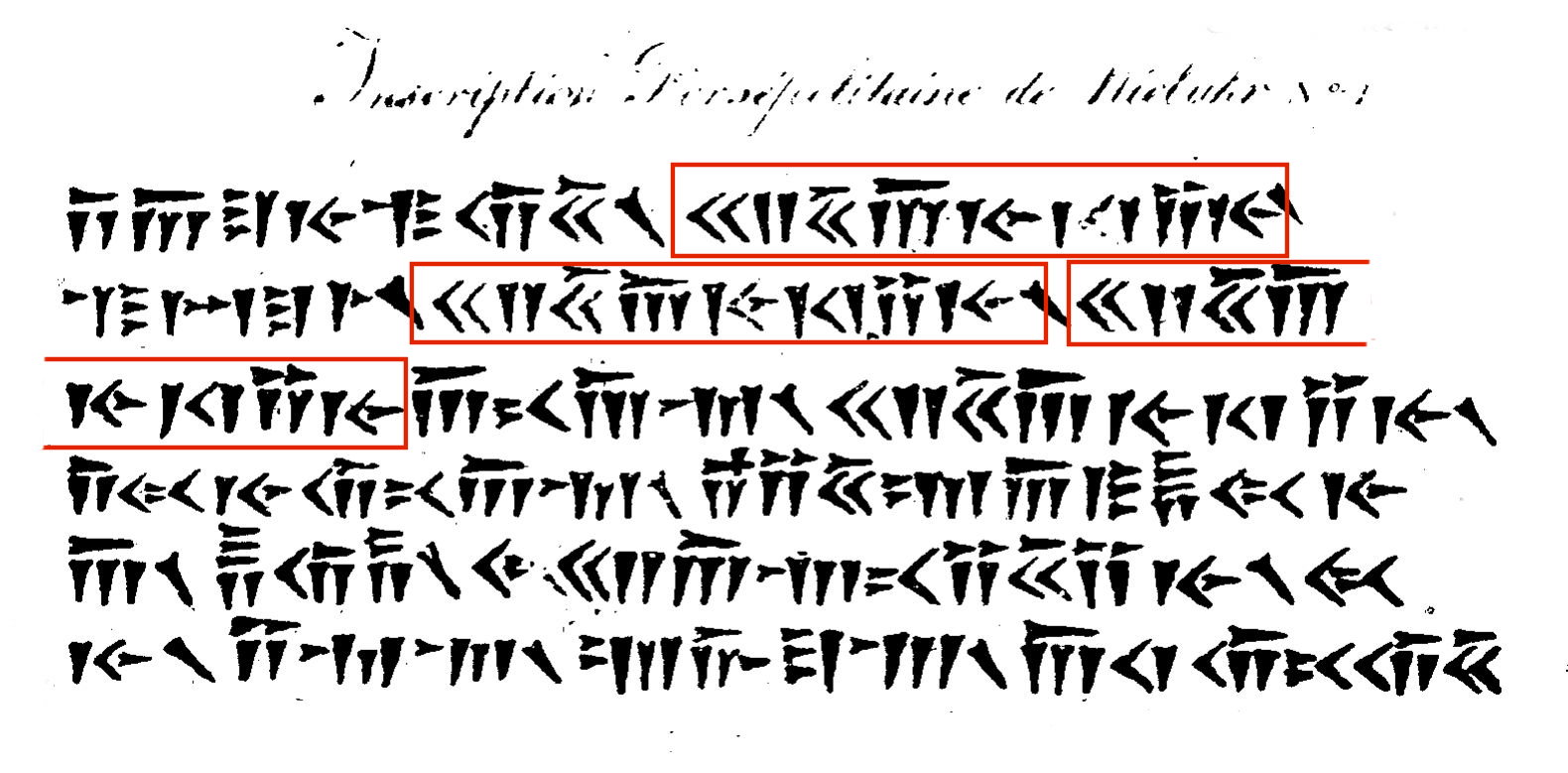
Niebuhr inscription 1, with the suggested words for "King" (𐎧𐏁𐎠𐎹𐎰𐎡𐎹) highlighted, repeated three times. Inscription now known to mean "Darius the Great King, King of Kings, King of countries, son of Hystaspes, an Achaemenian, who built this Palace". Today known as DPa, from the Palace of Darius in Persepolis, above figures of the king and attendants

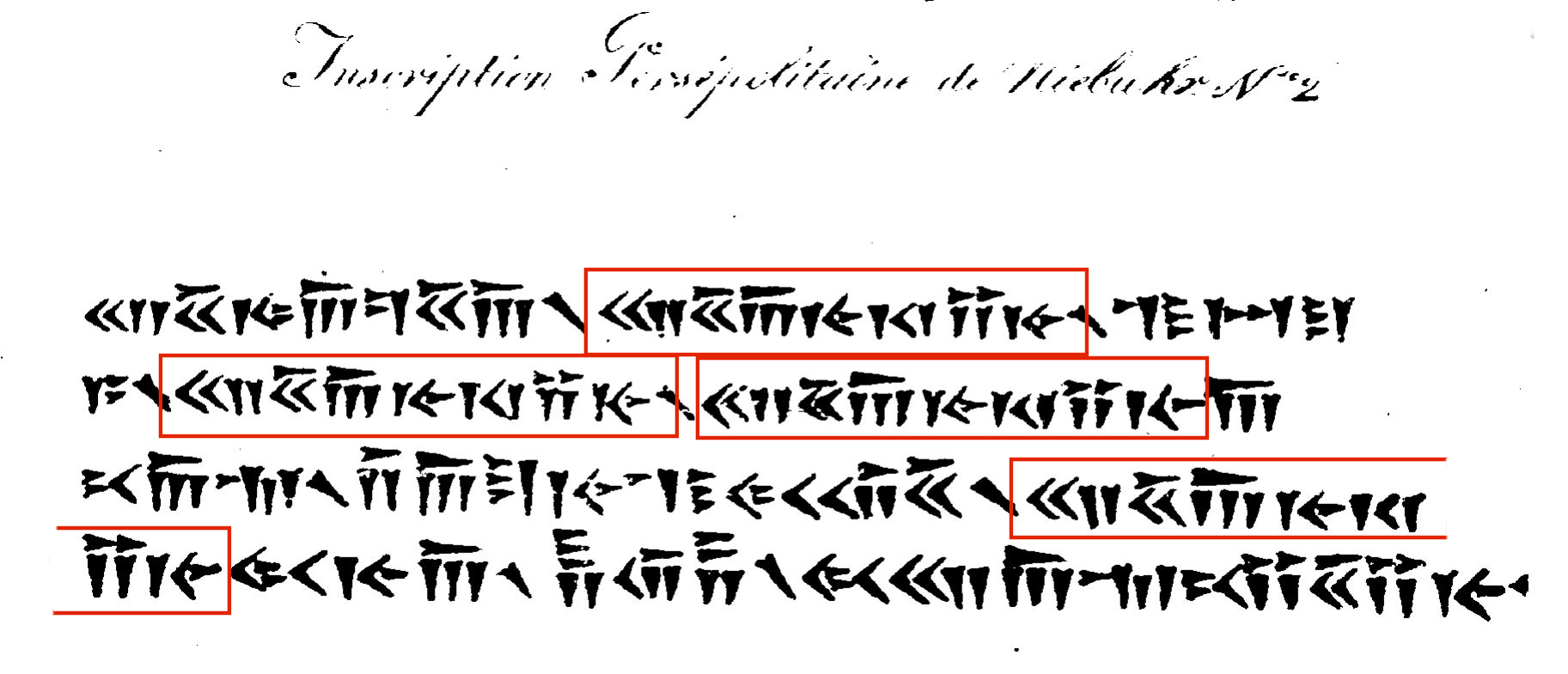
Niebuhr inscription 2, with the suggested words for "King" (𐎧𐏁𐎠𐎹𐎰𐎡𐎹) highlighted, repeated four times. Inscription now known to mean "Xerxes the Great King, King of Kings, son of Darius the King, an Achaemenian". Today known as XPe, the text of fourteen inscriptions in three languages (Old Persian, Elamite, Babylonian) from the Palace of Xerxes in Persepolis.

== Old Persian cuneiform: deduction of the names of Achaemenid rulers and translation (1802) ==
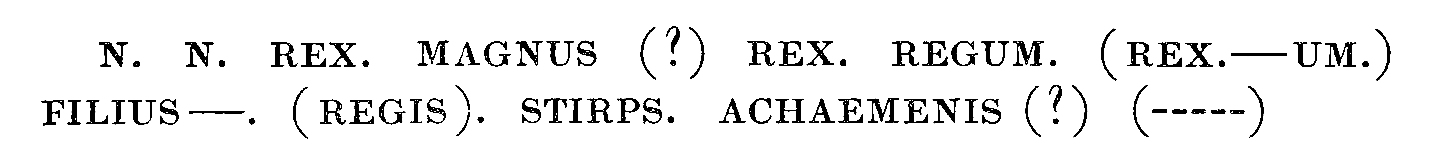
Hypothesis for the sentence structure of Persepolitan inscriptions, by Grotefend (1815).

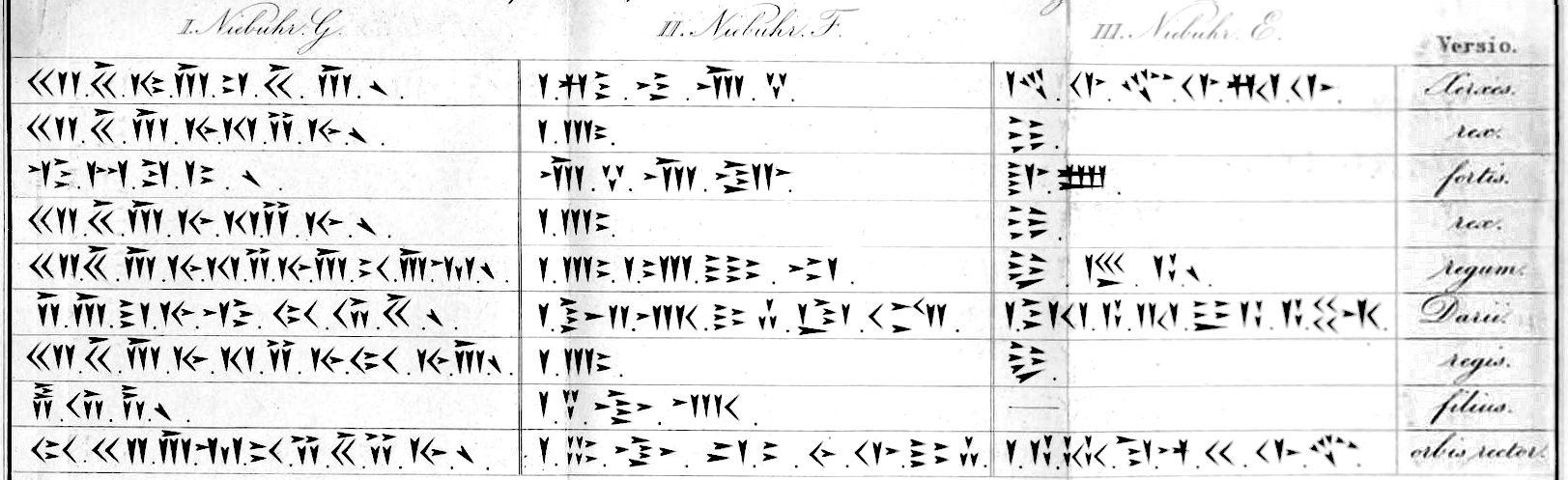
Relying on deductions only, and without knowing the actual script or language, Grotefend obtained a near-perfect translation of the Xerxes inscription (here shown in Old Persian, Elamite and Babylonian): "Xerxes the strong King, King of Kings, son of Darius the King, ruler of the world" ("Xerxes Rex fortis, Rex regum, Darii Regis Filius, orbis rector", right column). The modern translation is: "Xerxes the Great King, King of Kings, son of Darius the King, an Achaemenian".

By 1802 Georg Friedrich Grotefend conjectured that, based on the known inscriptions of much later rulers (the Pahlavi inscriptions of the Sassanid kings), a king's name is often followed by "great king, king of kings" and the name of the king's father. This understanding of the structure of monumental inscriptions in Old Persian was based on the work of Anquetil-Duperron, who had studied Old Persian through the Zoroastrian Avestas in India, and Antoine Isaac Silvestre de Sacy, who had decrypted the monumental Pahlavi inscriptions of the Sassanid kings.

By looking at the length of the character sequences in the Niebuhr inscriptions 1 & 2, comparing with the names and genealogy of the Achaemenid kings as known from the Greeks, and taking into account the fact that according to this genealogy the fathers of two of the Achaemenid rulers were not kings and therefore should not be so described in the inscriptions, Grotefend correctly guessed the identity of the rulers. In Persian history around the time period the inscriptions were expected to be made, there were only two instances where a ruler came to power without being a previous king's son: they were Darius the Great and Cyrus the Great, both of whom became emperor by revolt. The deciding factors between these two choices were the names of their fathers and sons. Darius's father was Hystaspes and his son was Xerxes, while Cyrus's father was Cambyses I and his son was Cambyses II. Within the inscriptions, the father and son of the king had different groups of symbols for names so Grotefend correctly guessed that this king must have been Darius the Great.

These connections allowed Grotefend to identify the cuneiform characters used in the names of Darius, Darius's father Hystaspes, and Darius's son Xerxes. He equated the letters 𐎭𐎠𐎼𐎹𐎺𐎢𐏁 with the name d-a-r-h-e-u-sh for Darius, as known from the Greeks. This identification was correct, although the actual Persian spelling was da-a-ra-ya-va-u-sha, but this was unknown at the time. Grotefend similarly equated the sequence 𐎧𐏁𐎹𐎠𐎼𐏁𐎠 with kh-sh-h-e-r-sh-e for Xerxes, which again was right, although the actual Old Persian transcription was wsa-sha-ya-a-ra-sha-a. Finally, he matched the sequence of the father who was not a king 𐎻𐎡𐏁𐎫𐎠𐎿𐎱 with Hystaspes, but again with the supposed Persian reading of g-o-sh-t-a-s-p (گشتاسپ), rather than the actual Old Persian vi-i-sha-ta-a-sa-pa.

By this method, Grotefend had correctly identified each king in the inscriptions, although his identification of the value of individual letters was inaccurate, for want of a better understanding of the Old Persian language itself. Grotefend correctly identified only eight letters among the thirty signs he had collated. However groundbreaking, this inductive method failed to convince academics, and the official recognition of his work was denied for nearly a generation. Although Grotefend's Memoir was presented to the Göttingen Academy of Sciences and Humanities on September 4, 1802, the academy refused to publish it; it was subsequently published in Heeren's work in 1815, but was overlooked by most researchers at the time.

== External confirmation through Egyptian hieroglyphs (1823) ==
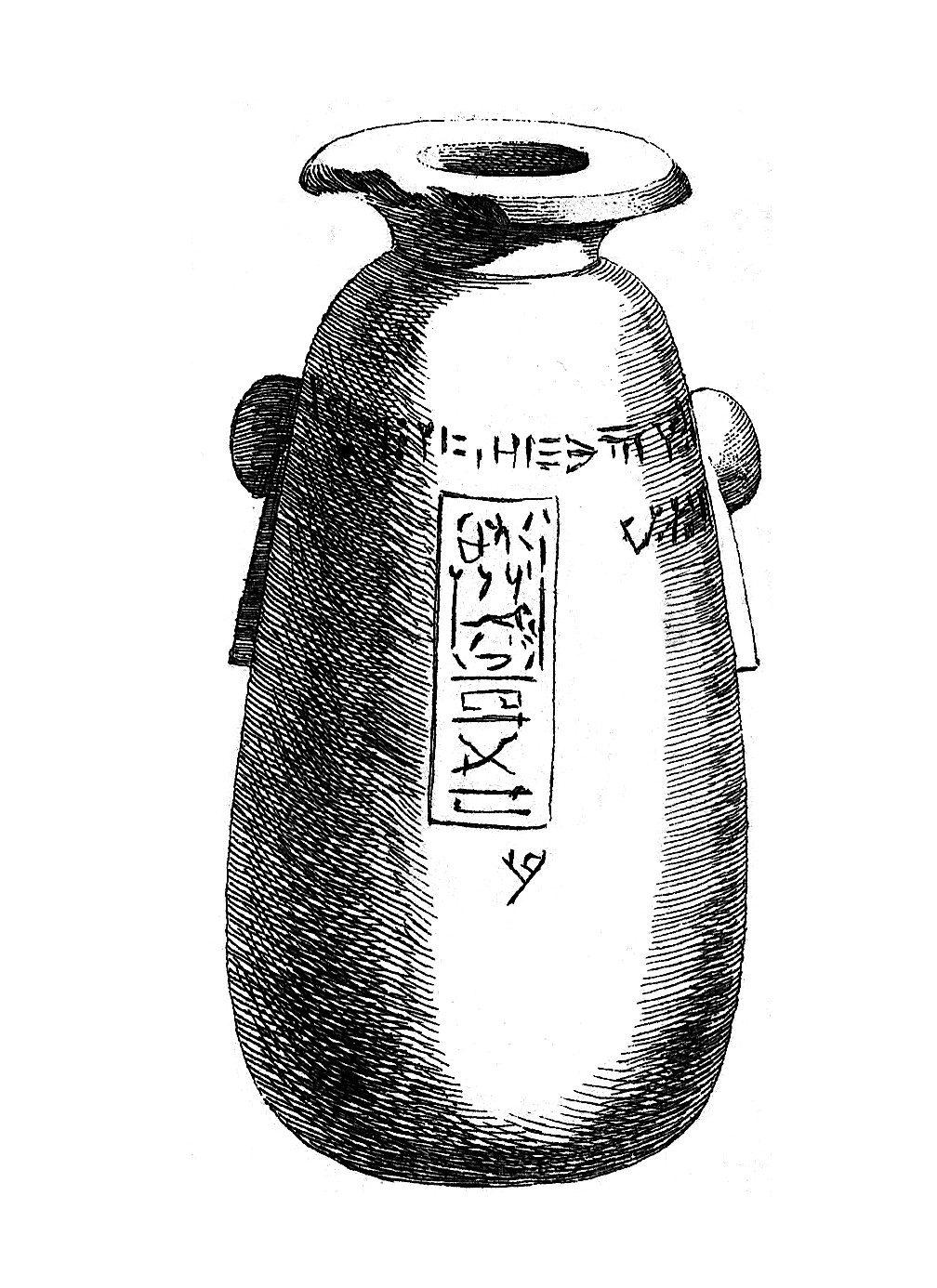
The quadrilingual hieroglyph-cuneiform "Caylus vase" in the name of Xerxes I confirmed the decipherment of Grotefend once Champollion was able to read Egyptian hieroglyphs.

It was only in 1823 that Grotefend's discovery was confirmed, when the French philologist Champollion, who had just deciphered Egyptian hieroglyphs, was able to read the Egyptian dedication of a quadrilingual hieroglyph-cuneiform inscription on an alabaster vase in the Cabinet des Médailles, the Caylus vase. Champollion found that the Egyptian inscription on the vase was in the name of King Xerxes I, and the orientalist Antoine-Jean Saint-Martin, who accompanied Champollion, was able to confirm that the corresponding words in the cuneiform script were indeed the words which Grotefend had identified as meaning "king" and "Xerxes" through guesswork. The findings were published by Saint-Martin in Extrait d'un mémoire relatif aux antiques inscriptions de Persépolis lu à l'Académie des Inscriptions et Belles Lettres, thereby vindicating the pioneering work of Grotefend. This time, academics took note, particularly Eugène Burnouf and Rasmus Christian Rask, who would expand on Grotefend's work and further advance the decipherment of cuneiforms. In effect the decipherment of Egyptian hieroglyphs was thus decisive in confirming the first steps of the decipherment of the cuneiform script.

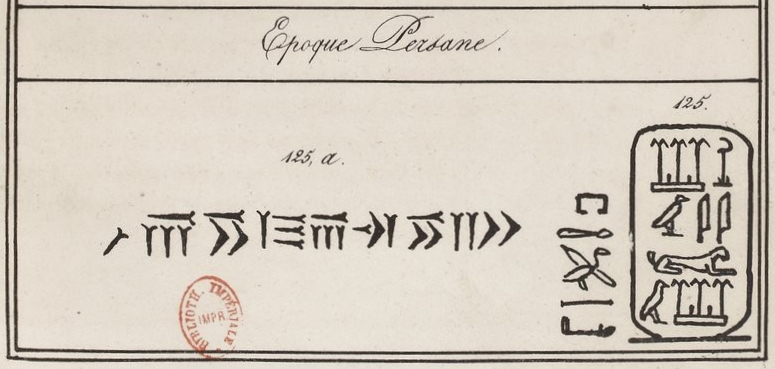
Equivalence between the hieroglyphs and cuneiform signs for "Xerxes", established by Champollion. Here the cuneiform script is mirror-inverted (it should be "𐎧𐏁𐎹𐎠𐎼𐏁𐎠𐏐", "Xerxes",), probably a typographical error.

=== Consolidation of the Old Persian cuneiform alphabet ===
In 1836, the eminent French scholar Eugène Burnouf discovered that the first of the inscriptions published by Niebuhr contained a list of the satrapies of Darius. With this clue in his hand, he identified and published an alphabet of thirty letters, most of which he had correctly deciphered.

A month earlier, a friend and pupil of Burnouf's, Professor Christian Lassen of Bonn, had also published his own work on The Old Persian Cuneiform Inscriptions of Persepolis. He and Burnouf had been in frequent correspondence, and his claim to have independently detected the names of the satrapies, and thereby to have fixed the values of the Persian characters, was consequently fiercely attacked. According to Sayce, whatever his obligations to Burnouf may have been, Lassen's

...contributions to the decipherment of the inscriptions were numerous and important. He succeeded in fixing the true values of nearly all the letters in the Persian alphabet, in translating the texts, and in proving that the language of them was not Zend, but stood to both Zend and Sanskrit in the relation of a sister.

— Sayce

== Decipherment of Elamite and Babylonian ==
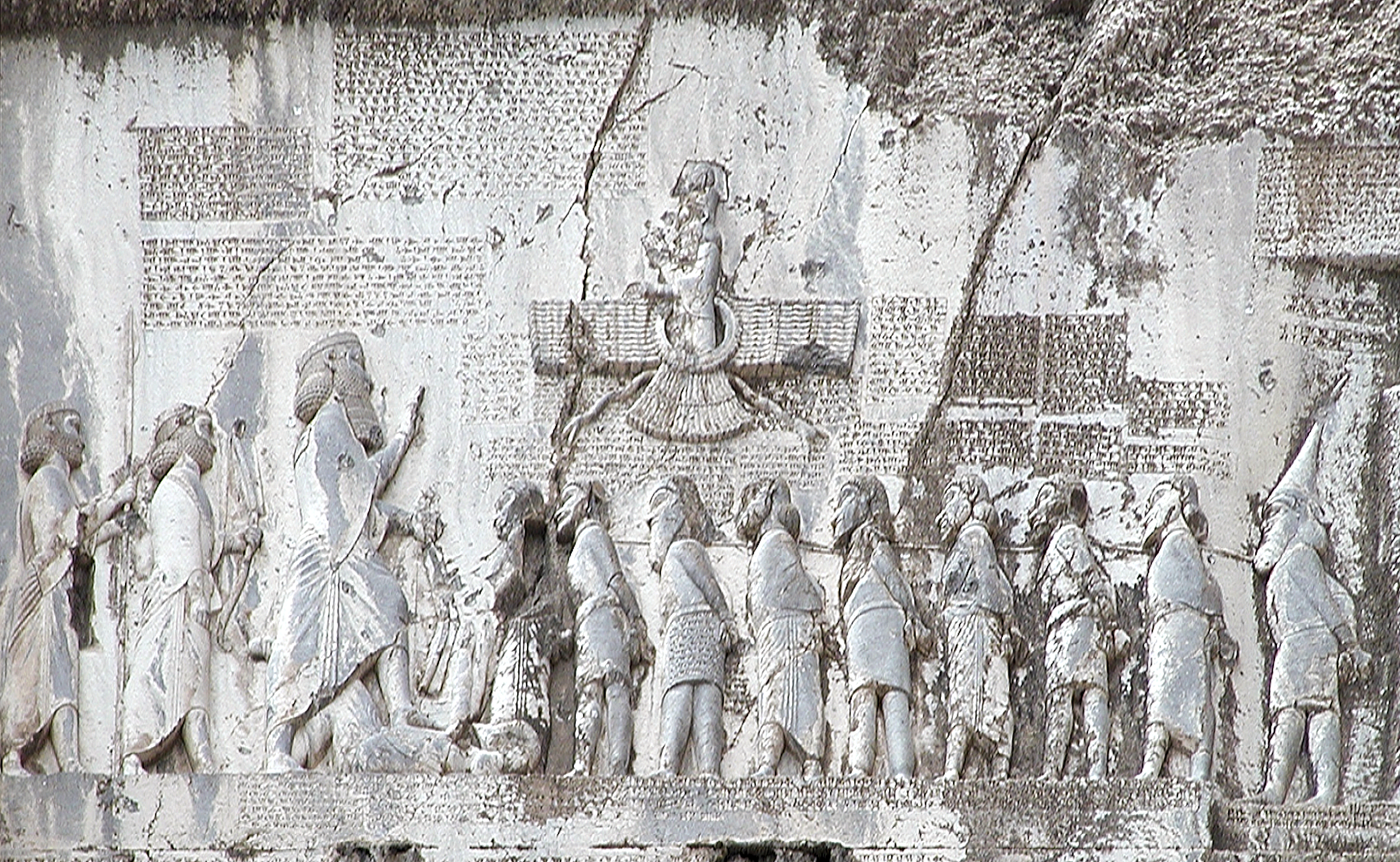
Once Old Persian had been fully deciphered, the trilingual Behistun Inscription permitted the decipherment of two other cuneiform scripts: Elamite and Babylonian.

Meanwhile, in 1835 Henry Rawlinson, a British East India Company army officer, visited the Behistun Inscriptions in Persia. Carved in the reign of King Darius of Persia (522–486 BC), they consisted of identical texts in the three official languages of the empire: Old Persian, Babylonian and Elamite. The Behistun inscription was to the decipherment of cuneiform what the Rosetta Stone (discovered in 1799) was to the decipherment of Egyptian hieroglyphs in 1822.

Rawlinson successfully completed the decipherment of Old Persian cuneiform. In 1837, he finished his copy of the Behistun inscription, and sent a translation of its opening paragraphs to the Royal Asiatic Society. Before his article could be published, however, the works of Lassen and Burnouf reached him, necessitating a revision of his article and the postponement of its publication. Then came other causes of delay. In 1847, the first part of the Rawlinson's Memoir was published; the second part did not appear until 1849. (Note: It seems that various parts of Rawlinson's paper formed Vol X of this journal. The final part III comprised chapters IV (Analysis of the Persian Inscriptions of Behistunand) and V (Copies and Translations of the Persian Cuneiform Inscriptions of Persepolis, Hamadan, and Van), pp. 187–349.) The task of deciphering Old Persian cuneiform texts was virtually accomplished.

After translating Old Persian, Rawlinson and, working independently of him, the Irish Assyriologist Edward Hincks, began to decipher the other cuneiform scripts in the Behistun Inscription. The decipherment of Old Persian was thus notably instrumental to the decipherment of Elamite and Babylonian, thanks to the trilingual Behistun inscription.

== Decipherment of Akkadian and Sumerian ==
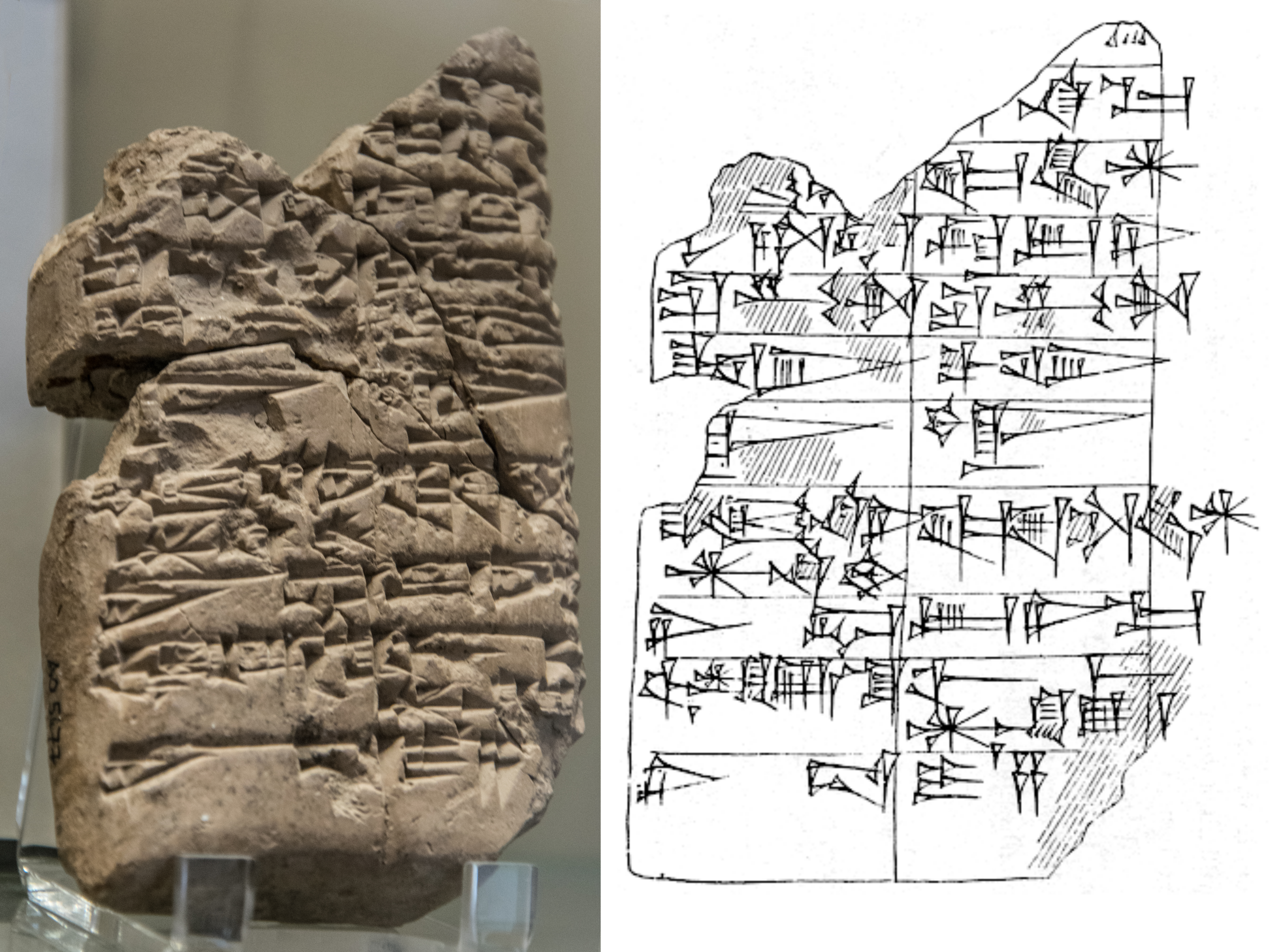
The first known Sumerian-Akkadian bilingual tablet dates from the reign of Rimush. Louvre Museum AO 5477. The top column is in Sumerian, the bottom column is its translation in Akkadian.

The decipherment of Babylonian ultimately led to the decipherment of Akkadian, which was a close predecessor of Babylonian. The actual techniques used to decipher the Akkadian language have never been fully published; Hincks described how he sought the proper names already legible in the deciphered Persian while Rawlinson never said anything at all, leading some to speculate that he was secretly copying Hincks. They were greatly helped by the excavations of the French naturalist Paul Émile Botta and English traveler and diplomat Austen Henry Layard of the city of Nineveh from 1842. Among the treasures uncovered by Layard and his successor Hormuzd Rassam were, in 1849 and 1851, the remains of two libraries, now mixed up, usually called the Library of Ashurbanipal, a royal archive containing tens of thousands of baked clay tablets covered with cuneiform inscriptions.

By 1851, Hincks and Rawlinson could read 200 Akkadian signs. They were soon joined by two other decipherers: young German-born scholar Julius Oppert, and versatile British Orientalist William Henry Fox Talbot. In 1857, the four men were requested to take part in a famous experiment to test the accuracy of their decipherments. Edwin Norris, the secretary of the Royal Asiatic Society, gave each of them a copy of a recently discovered inscription from the reign of the Assyrian emperor Tiglath-Pileser I. A jury of experts was impaneled to examine the resulting translations and assess their accuracy, and the results were published. In all essential points, the translations produced by the four scholars were found to be in close agreement with one another. There were, of course, some slight discrepancies. The inexperienced Talbot had made a number of mistakes, and Oppert's translation contained a few doubtful passages which the jury politely ascribed to his unfamiliarity with the English language. But Hincks' and Rawlinson's versions corresponded remarkably closely in many respects. The jury declared itself satisfied, and the decipherment of Akkadian cuneiform was adjudged a fait accompli.

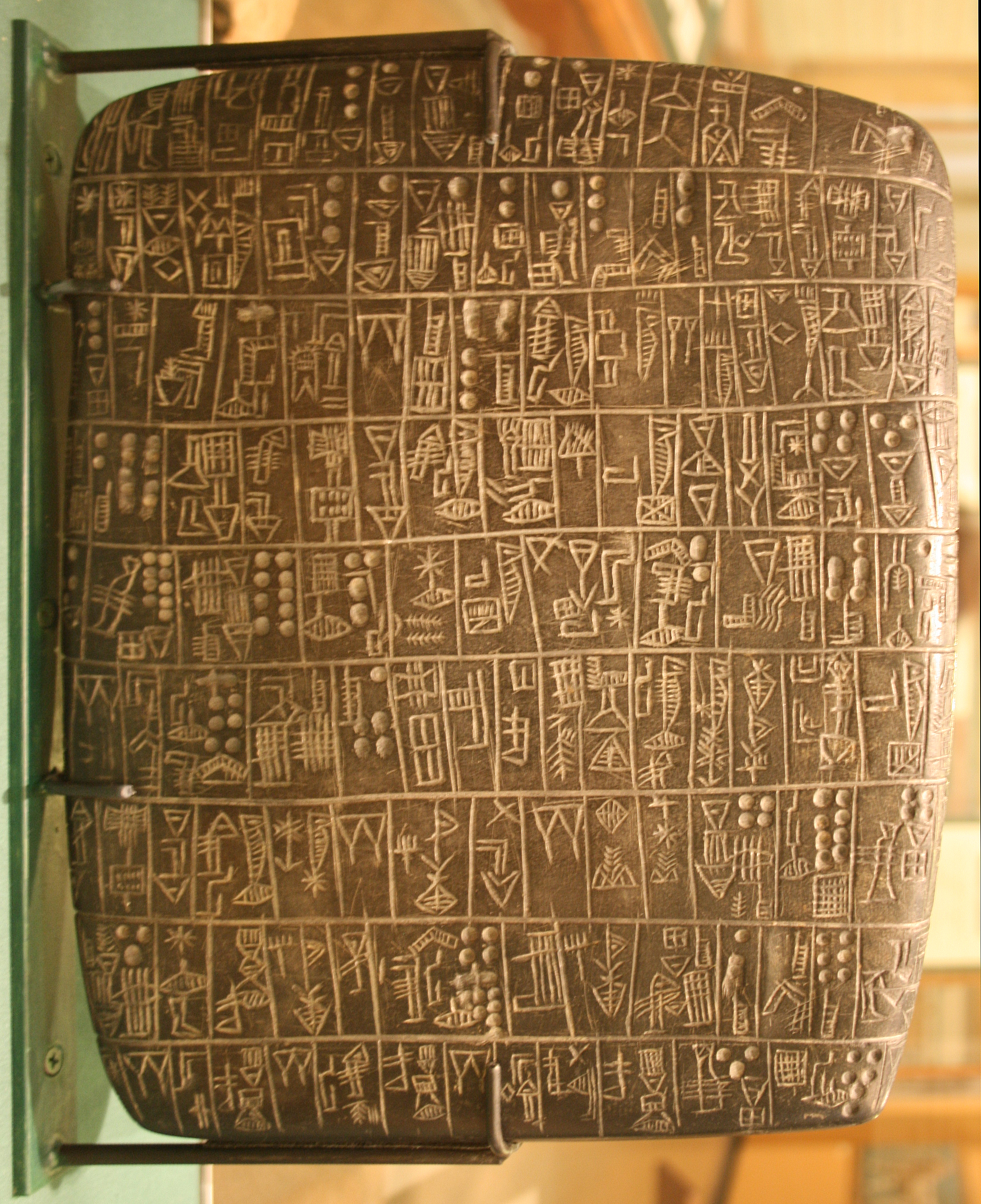
Sumerian was the last and most ancient language to be deciphered. Sale of a number of fields, probably from Isin, c. 2600 BC.

Finally, Sumerian, the oldest language with a script, was also deciphered through the analysis of ancient Akkadian-Sumerian dictionaries and bilingual tablets, as Sumerian long remained a literary language in Mesopotamia, which was often re-copied, translated and commented in numerous Babylonian tablets.

== Proper names ==
In the early days of cuneiform decipherment, the reading of proper names presented the greatest difficulties. However, there is now a better understanding of the principles behind the formation and the pronunciation of the thousands of names found in historical records, business documents, votive inscriptions, literary productions, and legal documents. The primary challenge was posed by the characteristic use of old Sumerian non-phonetic logograms in other languages that had different pronunciations for the same symbols. Until the exact phonetic reading of many names was determined through parallel passages or explanatory lists, scholars remained in doubt or had recourse to conjectural or provisional readings. However, in many cases, there are variant readings, the same name being written phonetically (in whole or in part) in one instance and logographically in another.

== Digital approaches ==
Computer-based methods are being developed to digitise tablets and help decipher texts. In 2023, it was shown that automatic high-quality translation of cuneiform languages like Akkadian can be achieved using Natural Language Processing methods with convolutional neural networks.

In November 2023, researchers made more accurate records of cuneiform writing with three-dimensional scans and a Region Based Convolutional Neural Network capable of appreciating the depth of the impression left by the stylus in the clay and the distance between the symbols and the wedges. The neural network was trained on 3D models of 1,977 cuneiform tablets, with detailed annotations of 21,000 cuneiform signs and 4,700 wedges.
