= Achaemenid royal inscriptions =

6th–4th century BCE cuneiform inscriptions

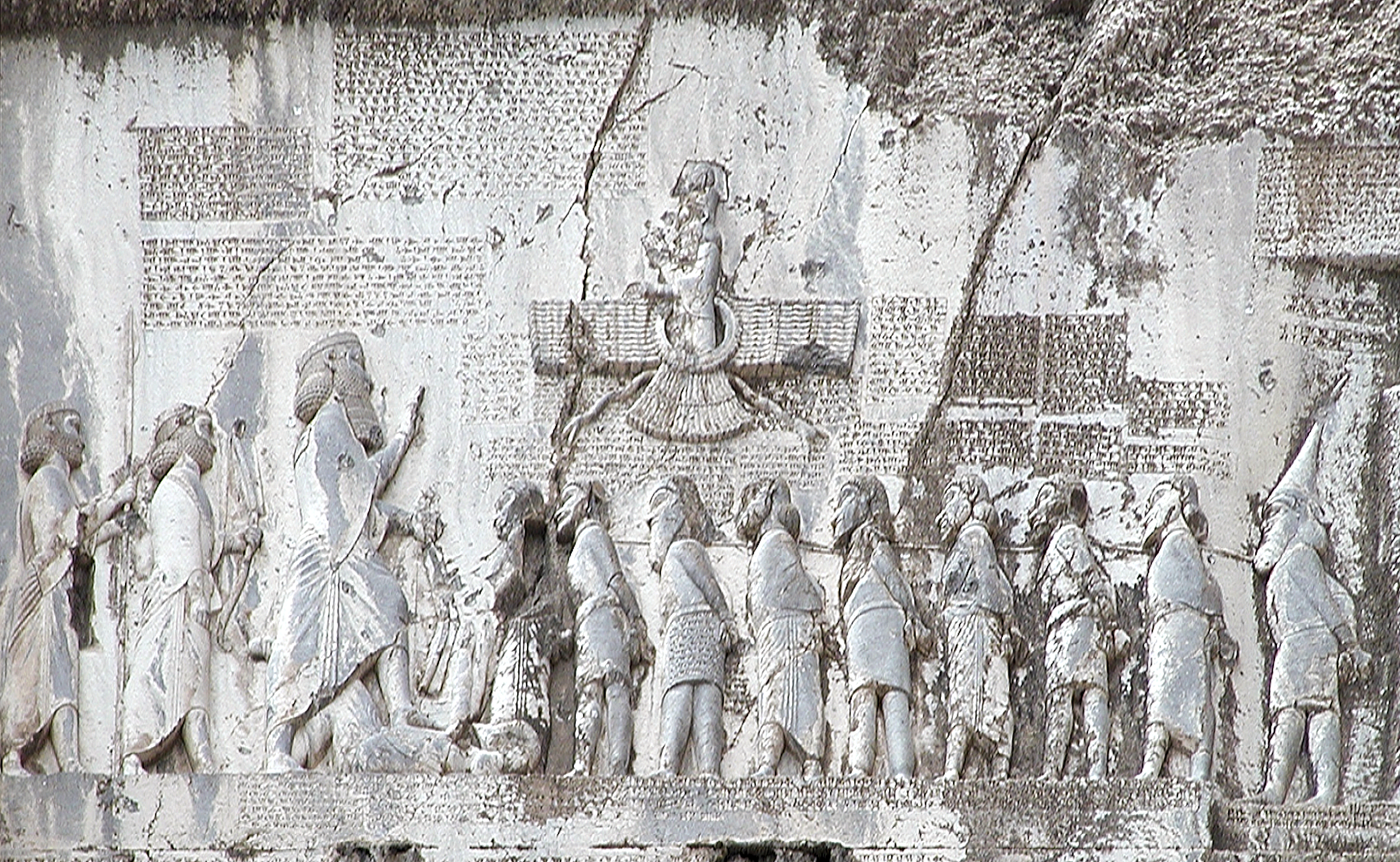
The Behistun inscription, the longest and perhaps the most famous of the Achaemenid royal inscriptions.

The Achaemenid royal inscriptions are the surviving inscriptions in cuneiform script from the Achaemenid Empire, dating from the 6th to 4th century BCE (reigns of Cyrus II to Artaxerxes III). These inscriptions are primary sources for the history of the empire, along with archaeological evidence and the administrative archives of Persepolis. However, scholars are reliant on Greek sources (such as Herodotus) to reconstruct much of Achaemenid history.

The Achaemenid royal inscriptions differ from earlier Assyrian and Babylonian inscriptions in their multilingualism, rhetorical style and their structure. The inscriptions are mostly trilingual – in Old Persian, Elamite and Babylonian, which use two separate scripts (Babylonian and Elamite use variants of the same cuneiform). When they appear together, the privileged position is usually occupied by the Old Persian inscription: at the top when arranged vertically, and in the middle when arranged horizontally.

The initial decipherment of cuneiform was based on the Achaemenid royal inscriptions from Persepolis, later supplemented with the Behistun inscription. Scholars deciphered the Old Persian cuneiform script first, followed by the Babylonian and Elamite language versions using the trilingual inscriptions.

== Overview ==
Map of the locations of the Achaemenid royal inscriptions; modern boundaries are shown.

The trilingual inscriptions illustrate the multi-ethnic complexity of the Achaemenid Empire: Old Persian is an Indo-European language, Babylonian is a Semitic language, and Elamite is a language isolate. The three versions of the trilingual inscriptions are not exact translations of each other. Sometimes passages are added in one language version that do not appear in the other two. There are also differences in details when the text refers to specific people: the Old Persian version often emphasizes the rulers, the Elamite version the locations, and the Babylonian version the subject peoples, reflecting the different social classes that spoke each language.

A few Achaemenid inscriptions are instead written in Egyptian hieroglyphs, for example in stelae found near the Suez Canal. Other hieroglyphic text has been found on crockery and pottery vessels that were made in Egypt but excavated at Persepolis, Susa, and possibly Babylonia. A statue of Darius I was also made in Egypt but brought to Susa.

Imperial Aramaic is conspicuous by its absence from the inscriptions, despite it being the official language of the empire in later periods. There are a few isolated Aramaic characters on Achaemenid objects such as seals, weights and coins. The only royal inscription in Aramaic was found at Elephantine in Upper Egypt and is a copy of the Behistun inscription.

In 1958 Richard Hallock compiled statistics on the length and numbers of the Elamite language versions of the royal inscriptions. The Behistun inscription is the longest inscription, whilst the other inscriptions are shorter and more repetitive. 44 Elamite texts are from the reign of Darius I, followed by 13 from that of Xerxes I, while the reigns of Artaxerxes I and Artaxerxes II have 7 texts each. Only two Elamite texts are from the reign of Cyrus II: the inscriptions CMa and CMc.

Most of the inscriptions have been found in the Achaemenid heartlands (in Pasargadae, Persepolis, Naqsh-e Rostam) with smaller numbers in the wider empire (at Susa, Bisutun, Ganjnameh, Babylon). The only inscriptions outside of Iran are the Xerxes I inscription at Van, in eastern Anatolia, and some from the period of Cyrus II.

The majority of the texts are found on royal monuments and statues, and many motifs are repeated. The inscriptions of Darius I were replicated by his successors, often with only small differences. Scholars have suggested that this was intended to emphasize the empire's continuity.

== Decipherment ==
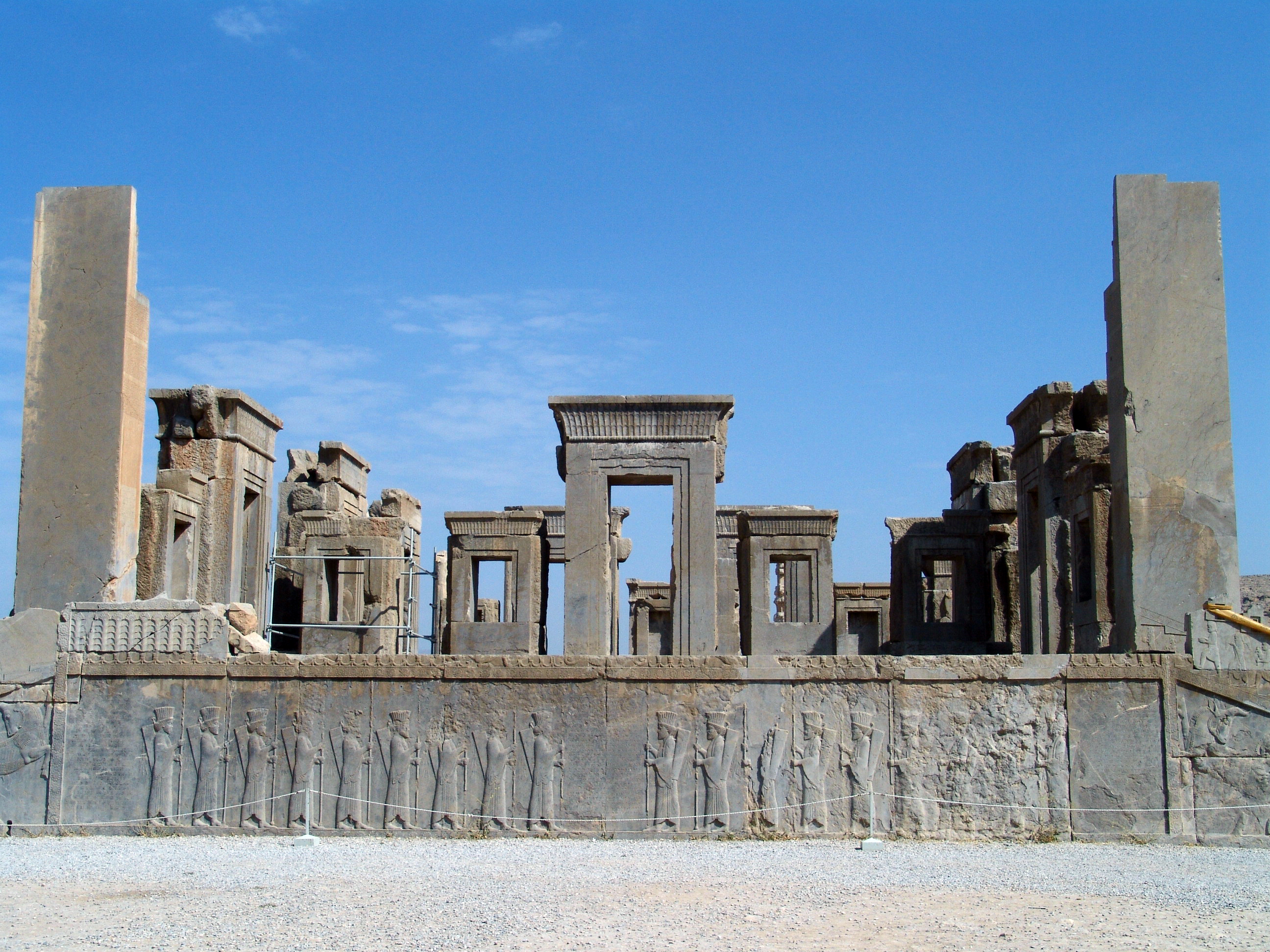
Inscription XPc at Persepolis, on the southern side of the Palace of Darius. It is repeated three times, known as XPca, XPcb and XPcc. XPca and XPcc face each other towards the tops of the antas (large pillars) on the left and right respectively; both have 15 lines in Old Persian, 14 lines in Elamite and 13 lines in Babylonian. XPcb is on the bottom wall alongside the carvings of Achaemenid soldiers, with 25 lines for each language: Old Persian in the middle, Elamite on the right and Babylonian on the left.

The decipherment of the Old Persian cuneiform script of the Achaemenids played a crucial role in the decipherment of the Babylonian and Elamite language versions and other cuneiform scripts in the Near East. This decipherment was initially via names, or royal names, and the Avesta, which contains the Old Persian language in a developed form. The decipherment of the Achaemenid inscriptions can be divided into three phases.

In a first step, the writing direction was found out and that the Achaemenid inscriptions are three different scripts with a common text. In 1620, García de Silva Figueroa dated the inscriptions of Persepolis to the Achaemenid period, identified them as Old Persian, and concluded that the ruins were the ancient residence of Persepolis. In 1621, Pietro della Valle specified the direction of writing from left to right. In 1762, Jean-Jacques Barthélemy found that an inscription in Persepolis resembled that found on a brick in Babylon. Carsten Niebuhr made the first copies of the inscriptions of Persepolis in 1778 and settled on three different types of writing, which subsequently became known as Niebuhr I, II and III. He was the first to discover the sign for a word division in one of the scriptures. Oluf Gerhard Tychsen was the first to list 24 phonetic or alphabetic values for the characters in 1798.

The second phase, in which a first decipherment took place and correct values for a significant number of characters could be found, was initiated by Georg Friedrich Grotefend. He was the initial decipherer of Old Persian cuneiform. He was followed by Antoine-Jean Saint-Martin in 1822 and Rasmus Christian Rask in 1823, who was the first to decipher the name Achaemenides and the consonants m and n. Eugène Burnouf identified the names of various satrapies and the consonants k and z in 1833–1835. Christian Lassen contributed significantly to the grammatical understanding of the Old Persian language and the use of vowels. The decipherers used the short trilingual inscriptions from Persepolis and the inscriptions from Ganjnāme for their work.

In a final step, the decipherment of the Behistun inscription was completed by Henry Rawlinson and Edward Hincks. Edward Hincks discovered that Old Persian is partly a syllabary.

== List of inscriptions ==
=== Designations ===
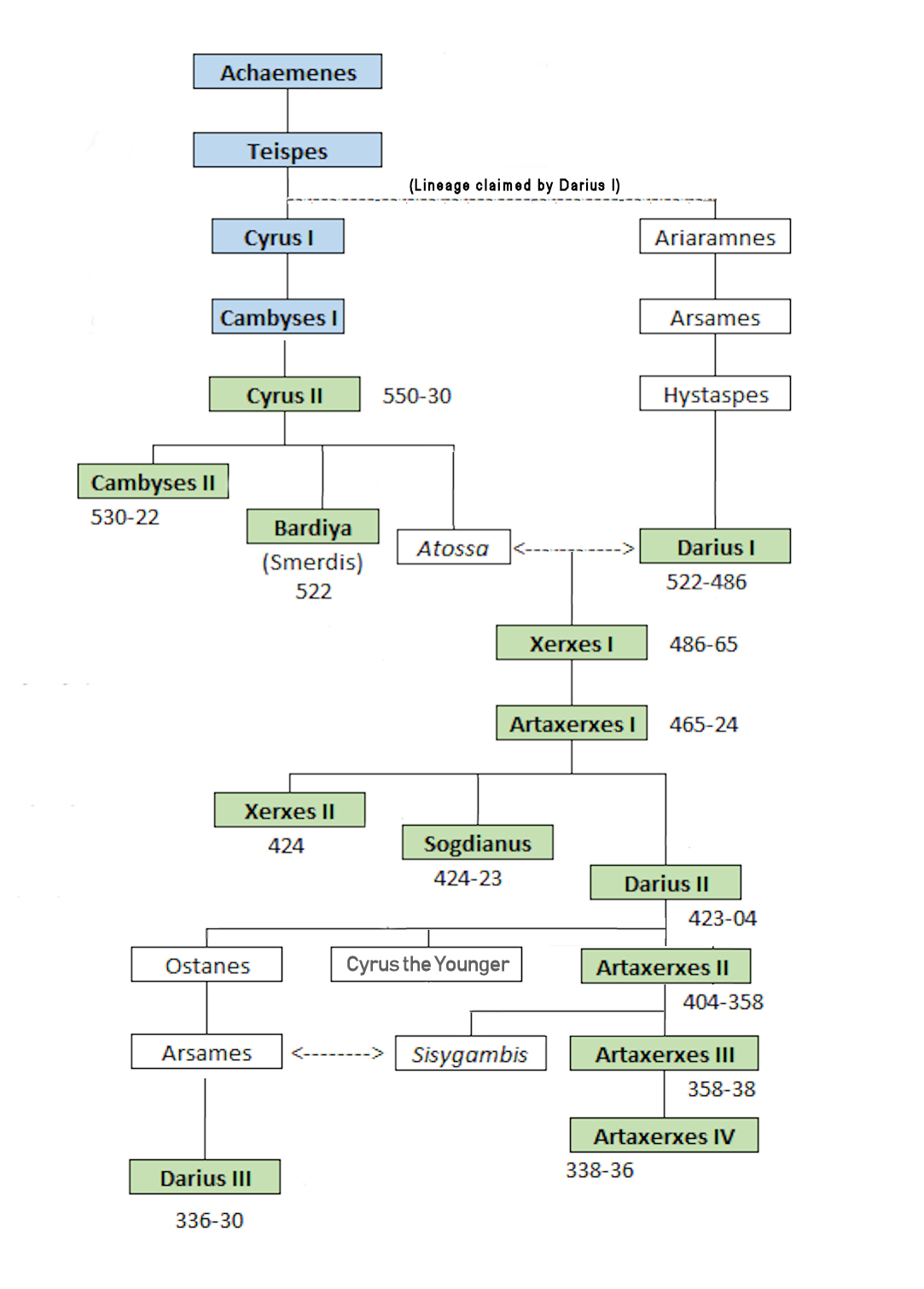
Achaemenid family tree

The designations or abbreviations of the Achaemenid royal inscriptions are based on the system introduced by Roland Grubb Kent in 1953. Manfred Mayrhofer (1978), Alireza Shapour Shahbazi (1985) and Rüdiger Schmitt (2000) have expanded and modified it. Rüdiger Schmitt's 2009 Die altpersischen Inschriften der Achaimeniden is considered the modern reference work.

The first letter of an inscription's designation does not designate the ruler or author, but the king whom the text expressly names, often right at the beginning in the nominative. The second capital letter designates the place of discovery and the third letter is an index used by scholars to distinguish multiple inscriptions from the same place.

=== Summary ===
The Achaemenid Royal Inscriptions online (ARIo) Project, part of the Open Richly Annotated Cuneiform Corpus, currently contains 175 composite texts with 11,712 words.

A 2021 list of the Achaemenid royal inscriptions counted 179 texts, from Darius I to Artaxerxes III. This categorization places the "non-authentic" inscriptions (i.e. inscriptions are "genuine" and date from the Achaemenid period, but do not come from the king who is listed at the beginning of the inscriptions) under the king during whose reign they were produced. The best-known "non-authentic" inscriptions are AmHa and AsHa from Hamadan.

Languages		Darius I	Xerxes I	Artaxerxes I	Darius II	Artaxerxes II	Artaxerxes III	Total
Languages		D	X	A	D2	A2	A3	
Quadrilingual	Persian, Babylonian, Elamite, Egyptian	1	15	5				21
Trilingual	Persian, Babylonian, Elamite	62	24	1	1	4	1	93
Bilingual	Persian, Elamite	4						4
Bilingual	Persian, Babylonian		1	1				2
Monolingual	Persian	18	10	2	4	6	3	43
Monolingual	Babylonian	4	2	1			1	8
Monolingual	Elamite	3				4		7
Monolingual	Aramaic	1						1
		93	52	10	5	14	5	179

=== List ===
Name	King	Discovery		Language				Publication
Name	King	Date	Place	Old Persian	Elamite	Babylonian	Other	Publication
AmHa	Ariaramnes	1930	Hamadan	check				
AsHa	Arsames	1920	Hamadan	check				
Cyrus A	Cyrus II	1850	Uruk			check		
Cyrus B	Cyrus II	1923	Ur			check		
Cyrus Cylinder	Cyrus II	1879	Babylon			check		
CMa	Cyrus II	1812	Pasargadae	check	check	check		
CMb	Cyrus II	1928	Pasargadae	check	check	check		
CMc	Cyrus II	1928	Pasargadae	check	check	check		
Zendan inscription	Cyrus II	1952	Pasargadae	check	check			
CM-Fragment	Cyrus II	1961–1963	Pasargadae	check				
DB	Darius I	1835	Behistun	check	check	check		
DB Aram	Darius I	1906–1908	Elephantine				Aramaic	
DEa	Darius I	1851–1854	Elvend	check	check	check		
DHa	Darius I	1926	Hamadan	check	check	check		
DNa	Darius I	1843	Naqsch-e Rostam	check	check	check		
DNb	Darius I	1843	Naqsch-e Rostam	check	check	check		
DNc	Darius I	1848	Naqsch-e Rostam	check	check	check		
DNd	Darius I	1848	Naqsch-e Rostam	check	check	check		
DNe	Darius I	1848	Naqsch-e Rostam	check	check	check		
DNf	Darius I	2001	Naqsch-e Rostam	check	check	check		
DPa	Darius I	1737	Persepolis	check	check	check		
DPb	Darius I	1704	Persepolis	check	check	check		
DPc	Darius I	1664–1670	Persepolis	check	check	check		
DPd	Darius I	1774–1778	Persepolis	check				
DPe	Darius I	1774–1778	Persepolis	check				
DPf	Darius I	1774–1778	Persepolis		check			
DPg	Darius I	1774–1778	Persepolis			check		
DPh	Darius I	1933	Persepolis	check	check	check		
DSaa	Darius I	1969/1970	Susa			check		
DSab	Darius I	1972	Susa	check	check	check	Egyptian	
DSf	Darius I	1900	Susa	check	check	check		
DSq	Darius I	1929	Susa	check				
DSz	Darius I	1969/1970	Susa		check			
XEa	Xerxes I	1851–1854	Elvend	check	check	check		
XPa	Xerxes I	1839	Persepolis	check	check	check		
XPb	Xerxes I	1711	Persepolis	check	check	check		
XPc	Xerxes I	1711	Persepolis	check	check	check		
XPd	Xerxes I	1851–1854	Persepolis	check	check	check		
XVa	Xerxes I	1827	Van	check	check	check		
	Artaxerxes I							
	Darius II							
A2Ha	Artaxerxes II	1886	Hamadan	check	check	check		
A2Hb	Artaxerxes II	1926	Hamadan	check				
A2Hc	Artaxerxes II	1948	Hamadan	check				
A2Hd	Artaxerxes II		Hamadan					
A2Sa	Artaxerxes II	1849–1852	Susa	check	check	check		
A2Sb	Artaxerxes II	1849–1852	Susa	check	check	check		
A2Sc	Artaxerxes II	1890	Susa	check				
A2Sd	Artaxerxes II	1849–1852	Susa	check	check	check		
A3Pa	Artaxerxes III	1851–1854	Persepolis	check				
A3Pb	Artaxerxes III	1930	Persepolis	check	check	check		

== Forgeries ==
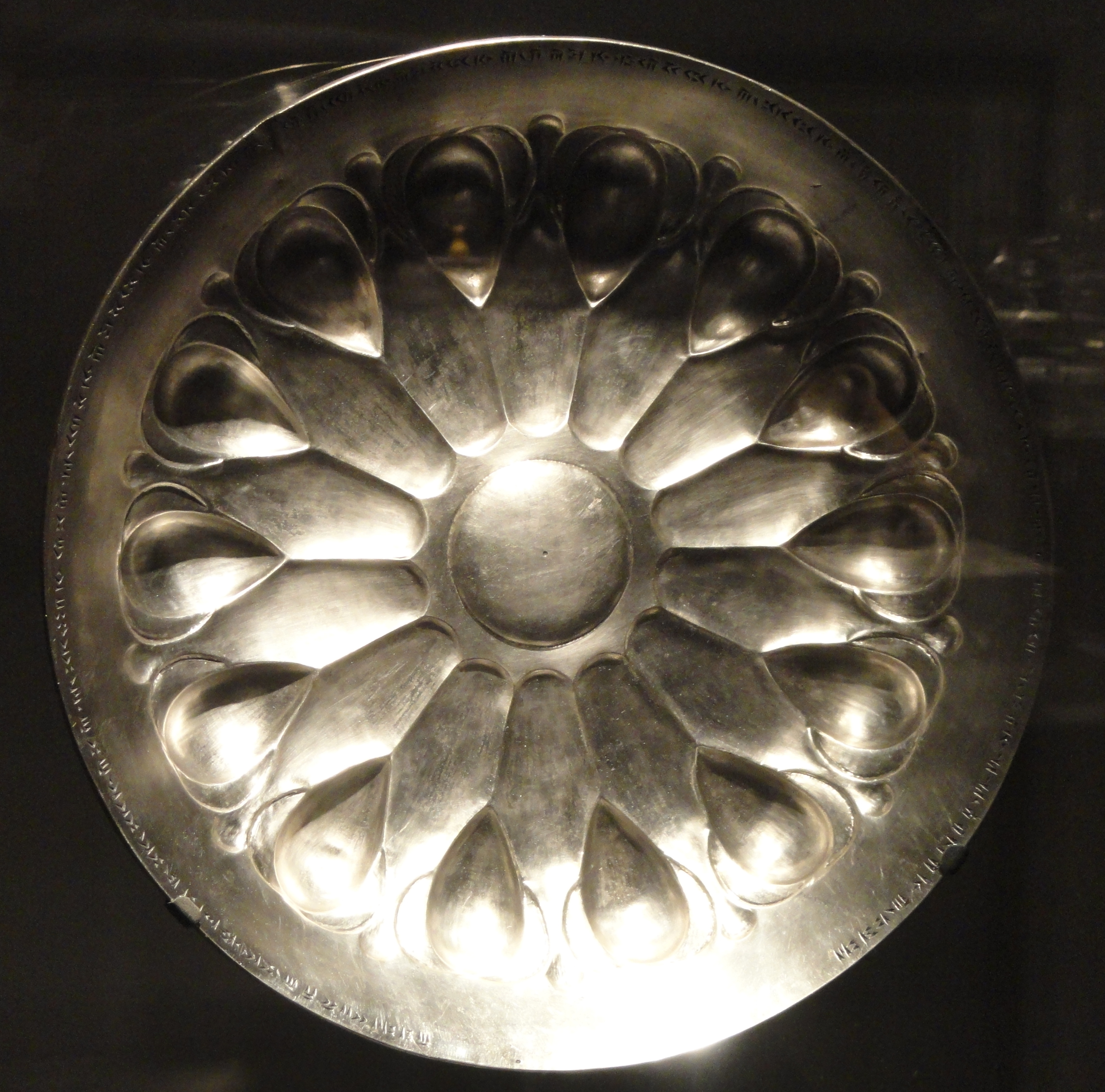
Phiale with forged inscription F 10

Forgeries from the Near East have been known since the 19th century. But it is only since the 1930s that products from Iran have flooded the art market, after illegal excavations in western Iran increased enormously. The actual "counterfeiting boom" took place after World War II until the Islamic Revolution. Fake art items were inscribed to increase the value of the item cause or to convey a supposed authenticity. The inscriptions were often copied from books in order to use them in abridged or modified form. They can be found on metal tablets, clay and stone tablets, figurative and similar objects, weapons, gems and seals. In total, Rüdiger Schmitt recorded 27 forged inscriptions.

In 1953, Roland Grubb Kent listed the known forged inscriptions ("spurious inscriptions"), gave them the name Spurium (abbreviation Spur.) and provided them with an index (spur. a–h). Manfred Mayrhofer added to the list in 1978 (i-k). Rüdiger Schmitt gave them new names in 2007: F for forged and N for replica.
