= Abraham de Wicquefort =

Dutch diplomat

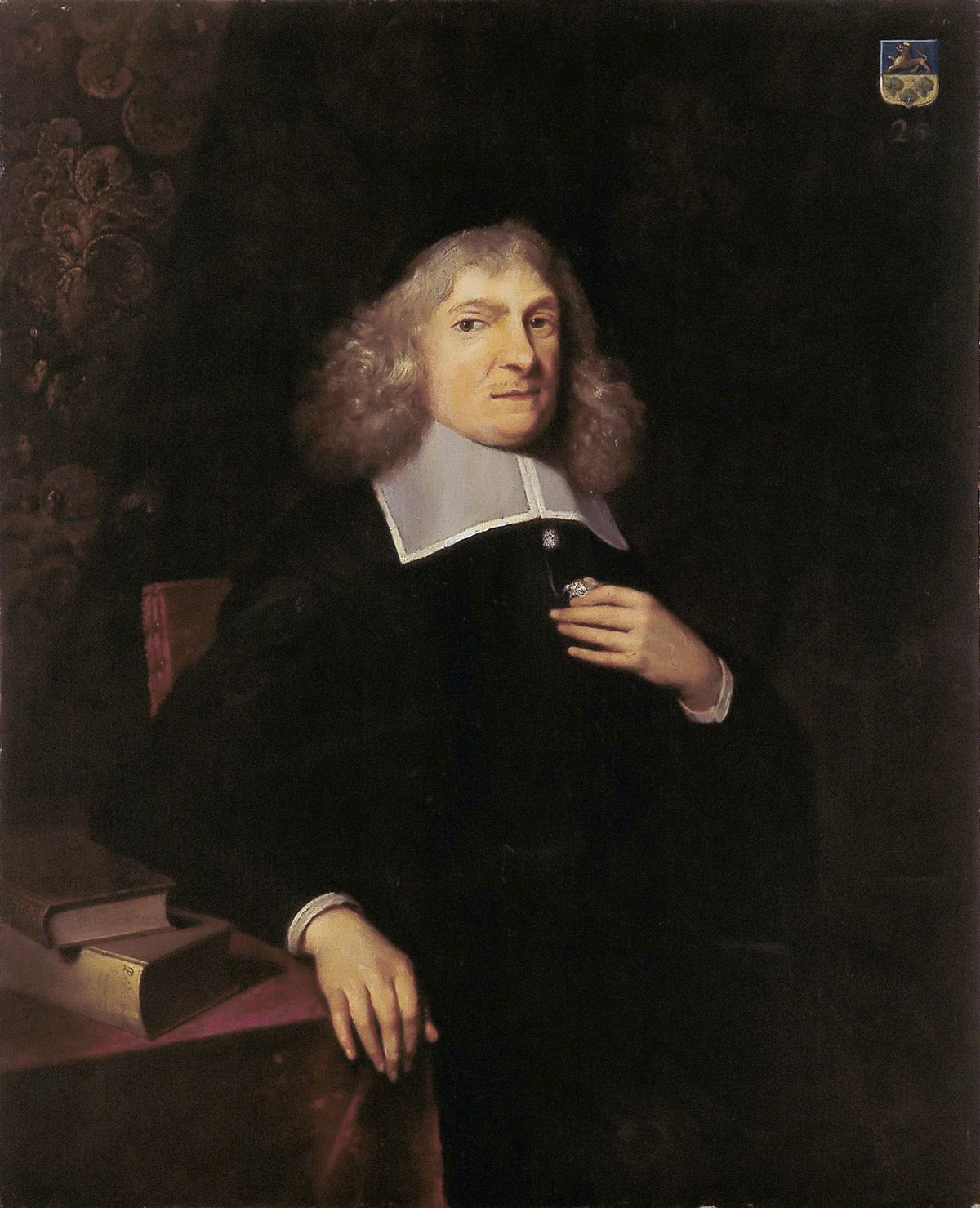
Portrait of Abraham de Wicquefort by Caspar Netscher

Abraham de Wicquefort (Dutch: Abraham van Wickevoort; 24 December 1606 – 23 February 1682) was a Dutch diplomat.

Born in Amsterdam, Wicquefort was the brother of Joachim de Wicquefort.

Between 1626 and 1658 he represented Brandenburg at the French court, but Cardinal Mazarin imprisoned him in the Bastille as a result of a suspicious exchange of letters. He was released after one year, was given a French pension and settled in the Hague as the representative of the Duchy of Braunschweig-Lüneburg. In 1675 he was put in prison by the Dutch government for treasonous relations with the French. He was given a life-time sentence and his property was confiscated. However, he managed to escape to Celle where he died.

Wicquefort translated travel accounts by Adam Olearius and García de Silva Figueroa's account of an embassy to Persia. He is also the author of L'ambassadeur, ses fonctions (two volumes, 1682) and L'histoire des provinces-unies des Pays-Bas (1719), which discusses the Treaty of Westphalia.

== Sources ==
- "Wicquefort–Victoria". Wicquefort, 1. Abraham van – via Project Runeberg.
