= Ganjnameh =

Ganjnameh Inscriptions
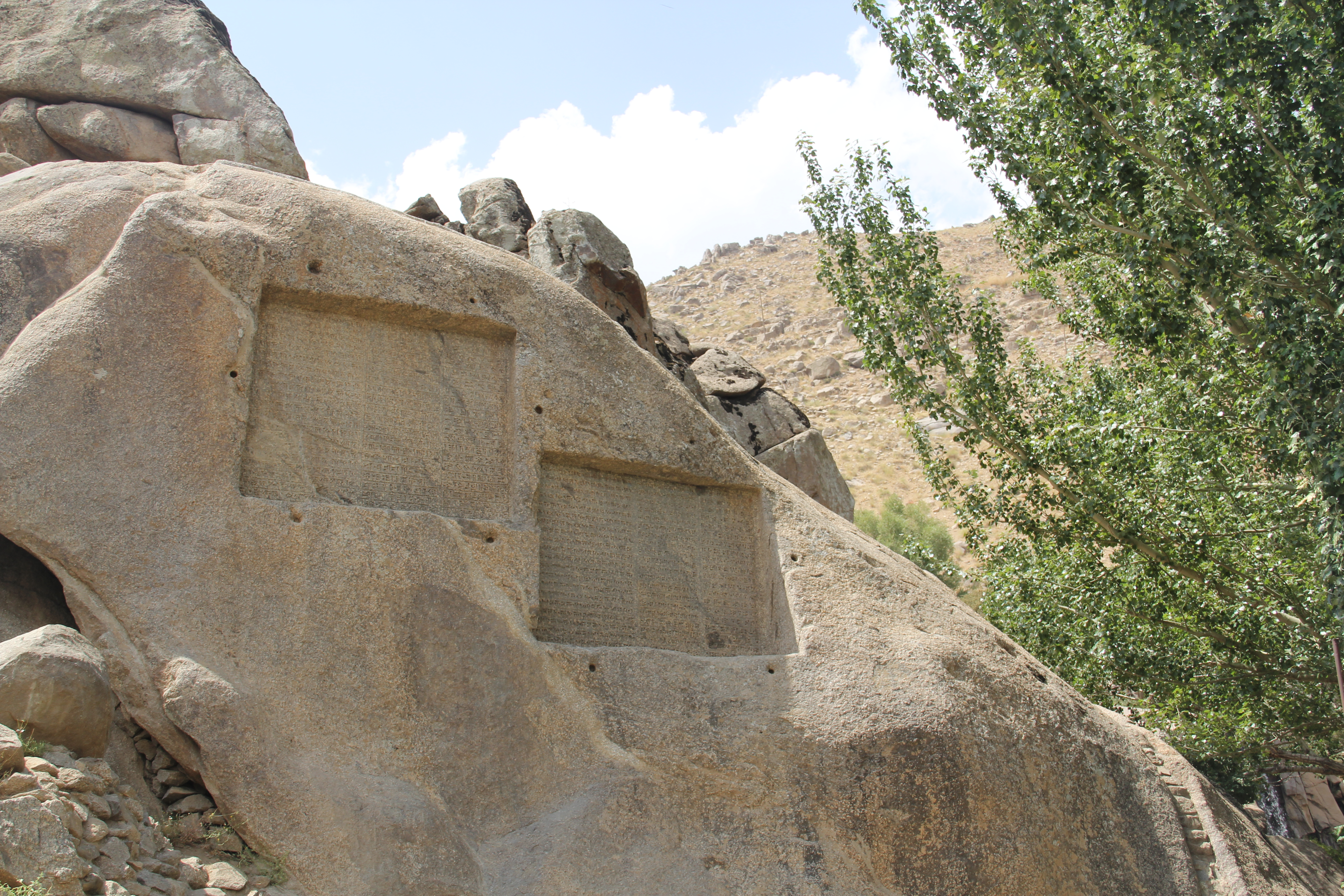

- Location within Iran
- 34°45′45″N 48°26′14″E
- Location: Mount Alvand, Hamadan, Iran

Iran National Heritage List
- Official name: Ganjnameh Inscriptions
- Type: Cuneiform Inscriptions
- Designated: 1932
- Reference no.: 92
- Conservation organization: Cultural Heritage, Handicrafts and Tourism Organization of Iran

Ganjnameh (Persian: گنج‌نامه, romanized: Ganjnāme, lit. 'Treasure Book') is located 12 km southwest of Hamadan (ancient Ecbatana) in western Iran, at an altitude of c. 2000 meters across Mount Alvand. The site is home to two trilingual Achaemenid royal inscriptions. The inscription on the upper left was created on the order of Achaemenid King Darius the Great (r. 522–486 BC) and the one on the right by his son King Xerxes the Great (r. 486–465 BC). (Note: The inscription of Darius is also known as the DE inscription, and the one created by Xerxes as the XE inscription.)

== Description ==
The two inscription panels of Ganjnameh, carved in stone in 20 lines on a granite rock above a creek, measure 2 × 3 m each. Written in Old Persian, Neo-Babylonian and Neo-Elamite, except for the different royal name, the contents of the two inscriptions are identical; Ahura Mazda receives praise, and lineages and conquests are listed. According to Stuart C. Brown, in the pre-Hellenistic period, this mountain was apparently the main "east-west pass" through Mount Alvand. During the Achaemenid period, Ecbatana functioned as summer capital due to its high elevation and pleasant weather.

The site received its name from locals, who believed that the inscriptions contained the secret code to a hidden treasure.

== Gallery ==
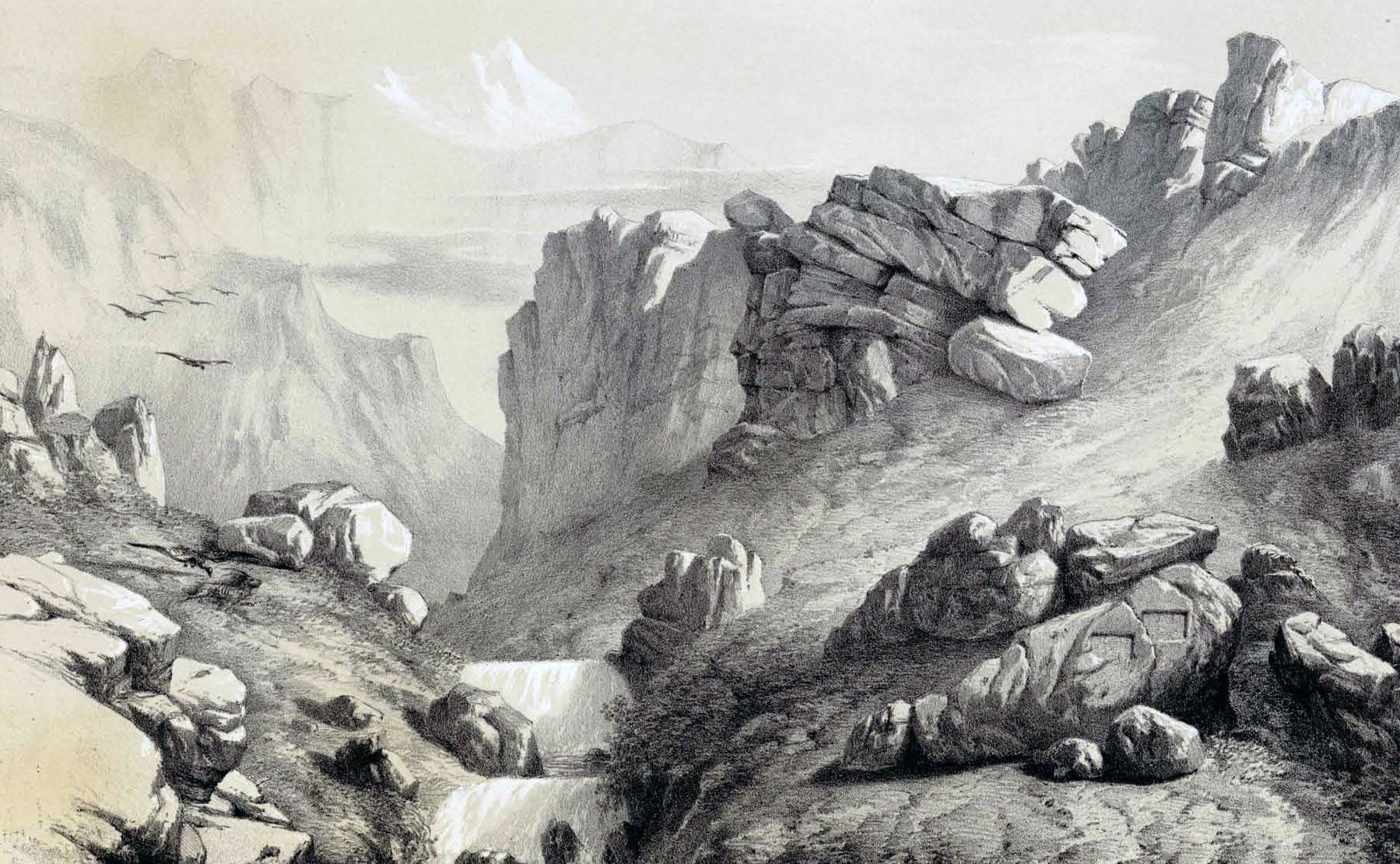
Eugène Flandin's 1840 drawing of Ganjnameh.

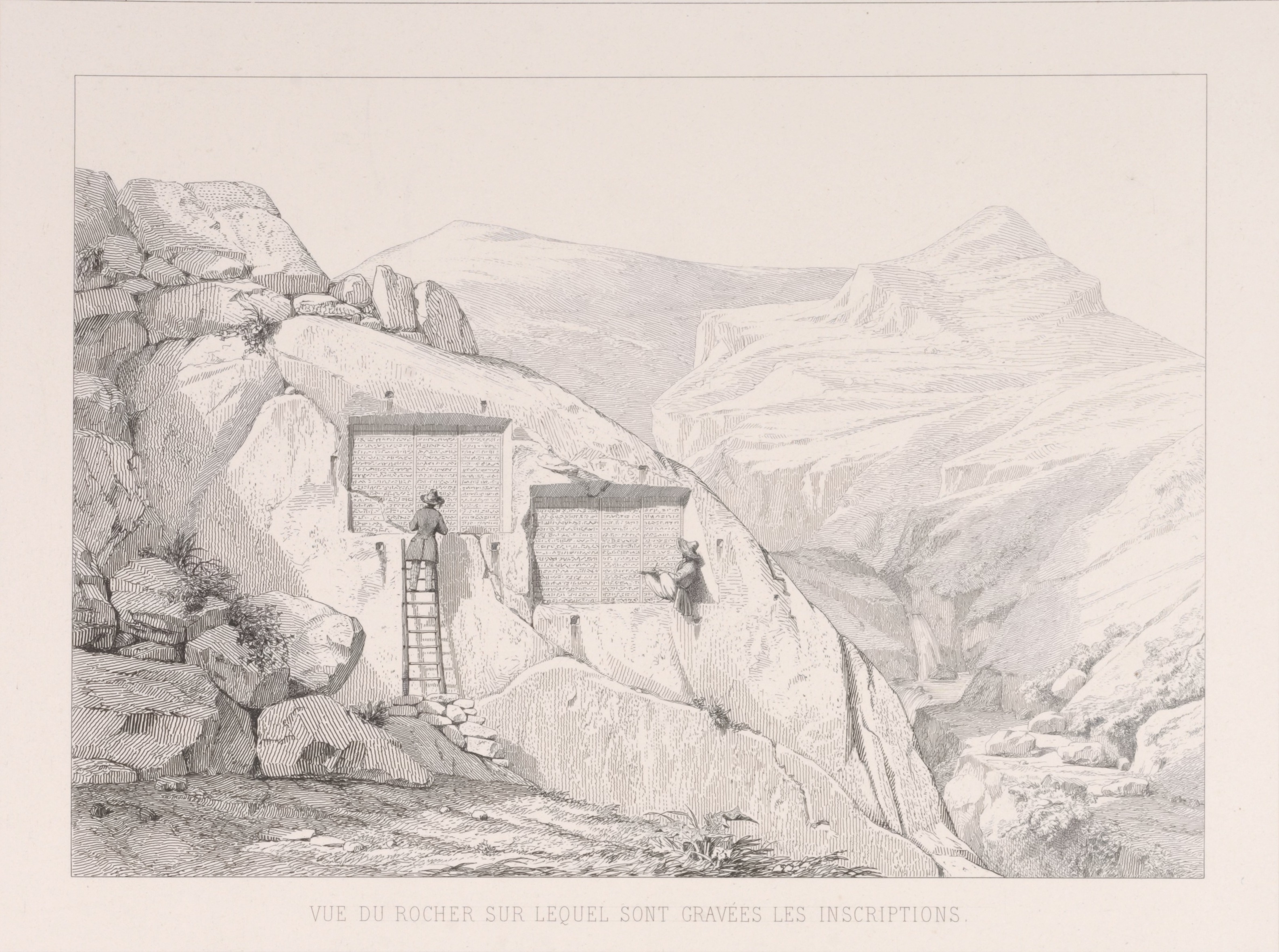
Pascal Coste's 1851 drawing of Ganjnameh.

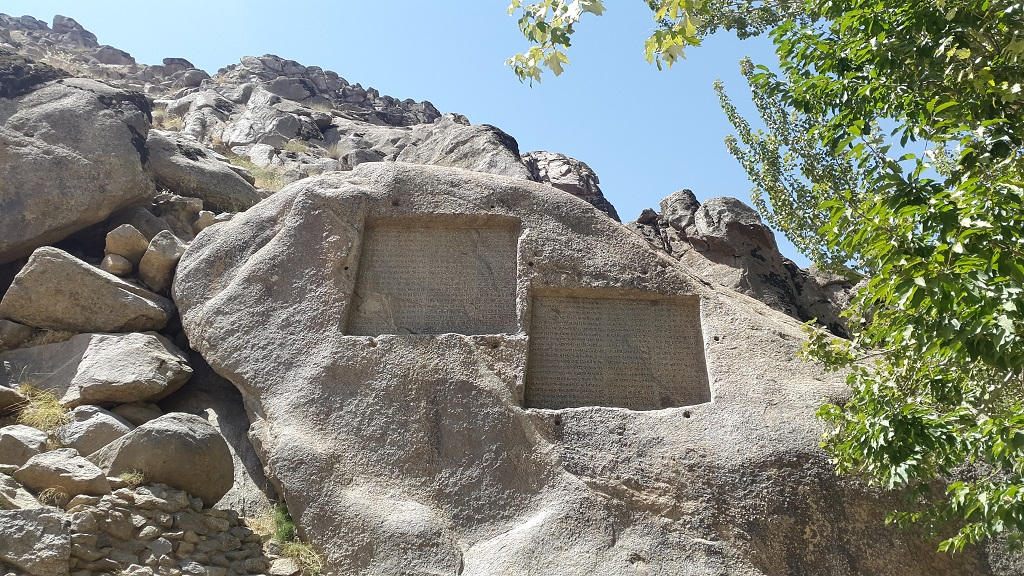
Ganjnameh inscriptions in 2018.

== Sources ==
- Brown, Stuart C. (2000). "Ganj-nāma". In Yarshater, Ehsan (ed.). Encyclopædia Iranica. Vol. X/3: Fruit–Gāvbāzī. London and New York: Routledge & Kegan Paul. pp. 285–286. ISBN 978-0-933273-47-4.
- Kia, Mehrdad (2016). The Persian Empire: A Historical Encyclopedia [2 volumes]. ABC-CLIO. ISBN 978-1610693912.
