= Alvand =

Mountain in Iran

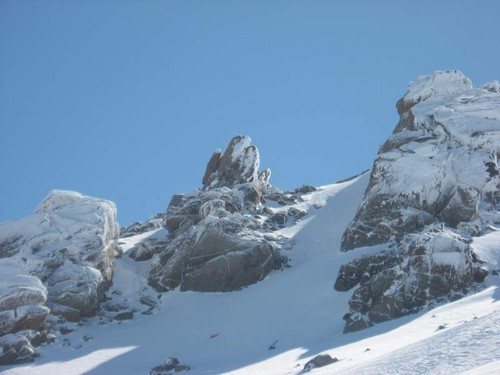

Highest point
- Elevation: 3,580 m (11,750 ft)
- Prominence: 1,654 m (5,427 ft)
- Listing: Ultra
- Coordinates: 34°39′51″N 48°29′12″E

Geography
- Location within Iran
- Location: Hamedan, Iran
- Parent range: Zagros Mountains

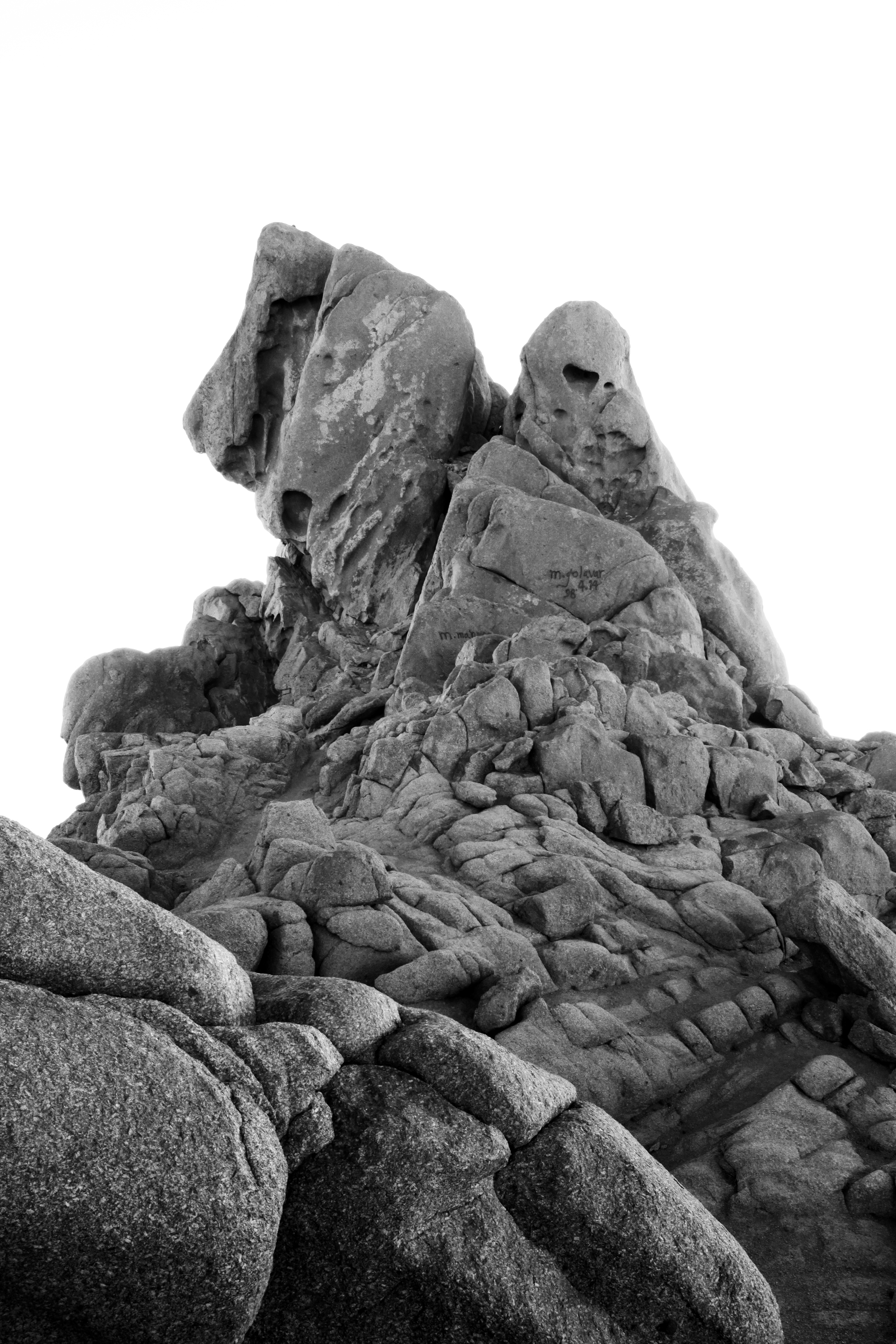
Alvand Summit, Hamedan, Iran

Alvand (Persian: الوند) is a subrange of the Zagros Mountains in western Iran located 10 km (6.2 miles) south of the city of Hamadan in Hamadan province. Its summit has an elevation of 3,580 m (11,750 ft). The main body of the Alvand range extends for about 50 km from east to west, while their maximum north–south width is about 30 km. Formed as part of the Zagros orogeny in the late Jurassic and early Cretaceous, the mountains rise sharply from the surrounding plains and are scored by many deep valleys. The mountains are mostly granite and diorite, which are types of intrusive rock.

The area was once covered by a light oak forest, but extensive deforestation in historical times has reduced this to only a small area, mostly in the valleys. Today, the higher altitudes have a sparse cover of grass, while grass cover grows more thickly around springs and streams. One important plant that commonly grows in the Alvand valleys is the gavar or goat's thorn, which produces the gum known as tragacanth, which is used in medicine and industry.

Although no settlements exist on the mountains themselves, the valleys and surrounding plains are home to many towns and villages. Several major cities lie at the foot of the Alvand range, including Hamadan, Malayer, and Tuyserkan. These settlements are supported by a highly productive agricultural base which includes wheat growing and livestock breeding (sheep, goats, and cattle). This agricultural prosperity comes from the combination of a favorable highland climate and an abundance of water flowing down from the Alvand mountains.

The historic site of Ganj Nameh, where two trilingual inscriptions were left in Achaemenid times, is located at the foot of the Alvand mountains, 10 km south of Hamadan. The Alvand range forms a language border between Turkish, Kurdish, Persian, and Luri.

== Etymology ==
An unacademic website claims that "Alvand" is Avestan and comes from the Avestan language word "Aurvañt", which means "quick, swift, brave; a steed, horse, racer, warrior".

== Climate ==
Mount Alvand is situated in a geographical location that has a Mediterranean climate with spring rains.

== Hydrology ==
The Alvand range forms the main watershed in Hamadan province, with most of the province's rivers arising from the snowmelt on Mount Alvand and then flowing either north or south. Generally, the rivers on the north side of the mountain are mostly seasonal, while those on the south side flow year-round.

The main rivers on the north side of Mount Alvand are the Talvar and the Qurichay (aka Siahrud). The Talvar begins at Kuh-e Safid in the northwest and ultimately joins the Sefidrud, the longest river in Iran, which flows to the Caspian Sea. The Qurichay, meanwhile, begins in the highlands between Hamadan and Malayer. It passes through the northern Alvand highlands and eventually drains into Lake Qom.

The main rivers on the south side are the Gamasiab and the Qelqelrud (itself a tributary of the Gamasiab). The Gamasiab is another name for the Karkheh River in its upper course. Its headwaters, known as the Sarab-e Gamasiab, are located southeast of Nahavand. The river then crosses the Nahavand plain and is joined by the Malayer River as well as the Qelqelrud.

Another river system, the Abshineh Rud, has its source on Alvand's eastern slopes. It flows north to the kavir of Qom, but because a lot of its water is used for irrigation, it only actually reaches the kavir after very wet winters. It reaches its peak flow during March and April and dries up almost completely during the summer.

== Nomadism ==
The Alvand highlands are the traditional pastures for several nomadic tribes. The Torkeshvand, who speak the Laki language, have their summer pasture on the western slopes of Alvand, while the Yarimtoghlu have theirs on the east side. A third group that belongs to the Shahsevan also comes to the east side, but only in small numbers. Since the 20th century, sedentary agriculture and livestock breeding has expanded significantly into what used to be nomadic territory.

== Gallery ==
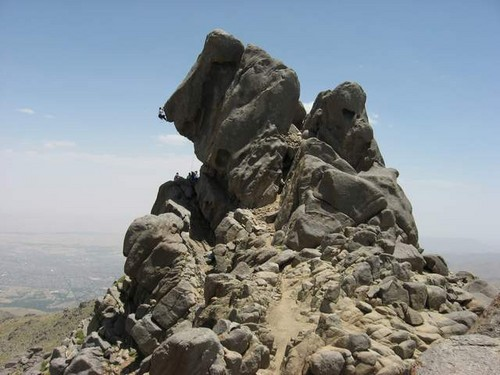
Alvand Summit, Summer 2006

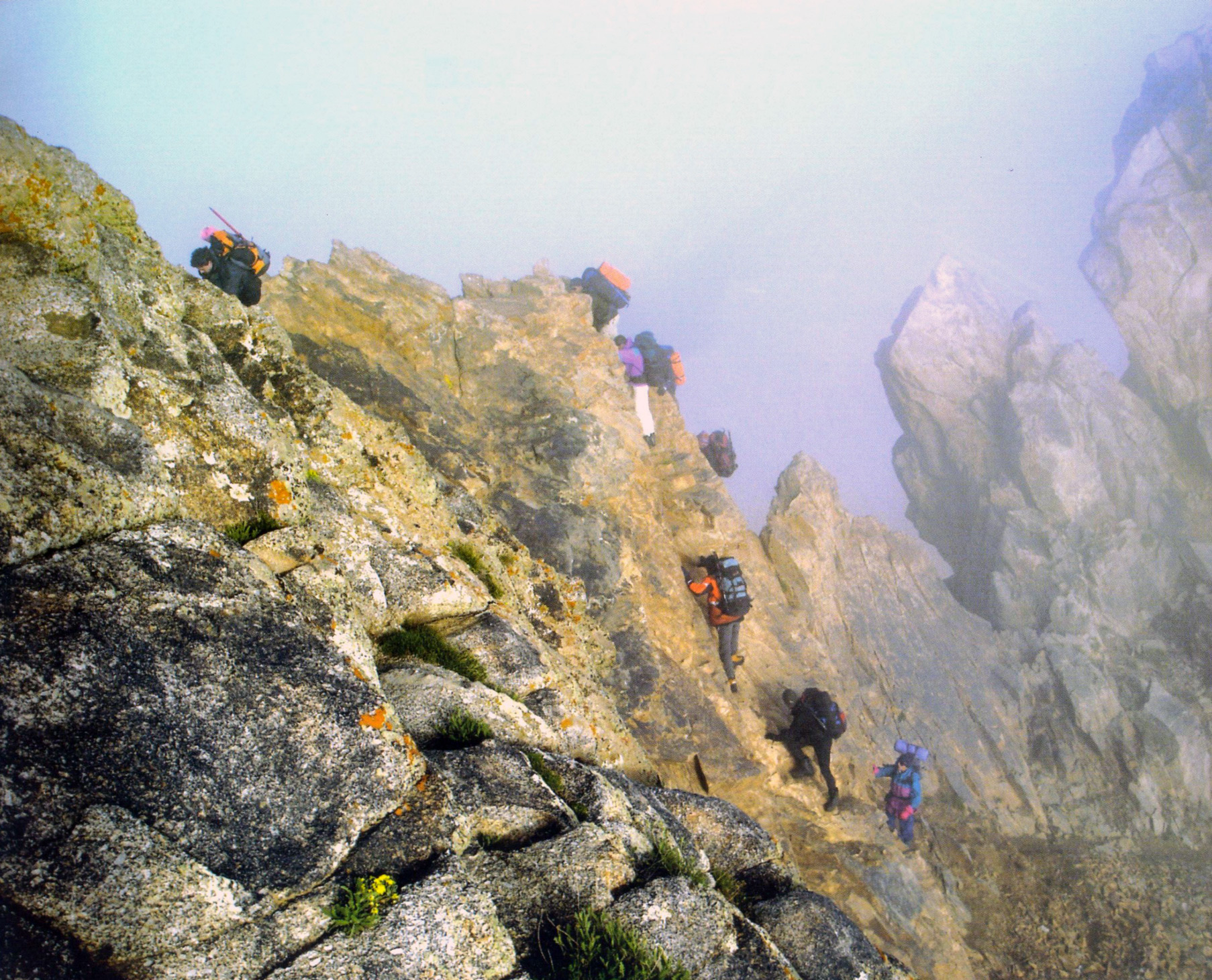
Kalagh lane (crow's nest)

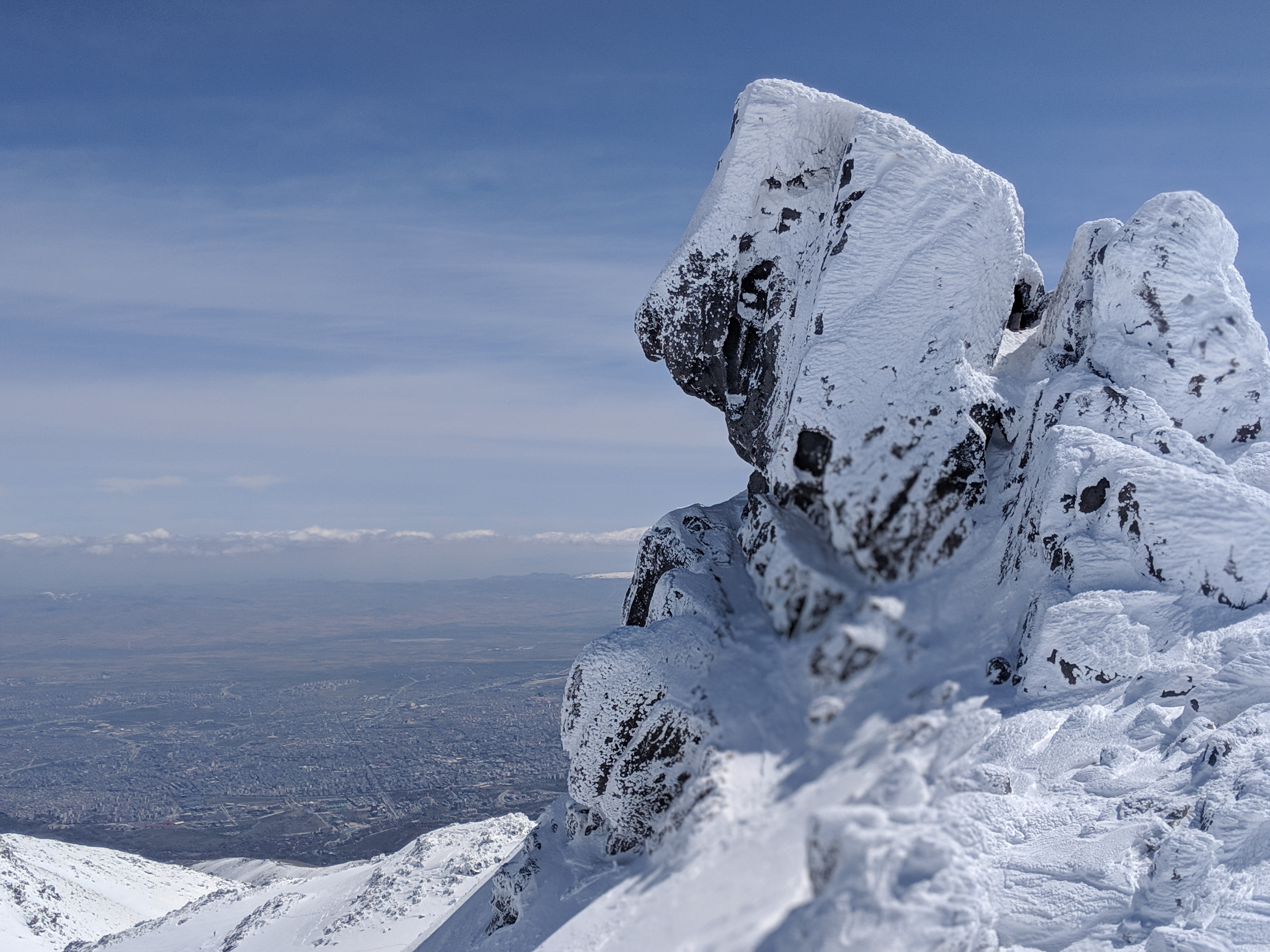
The summit winter

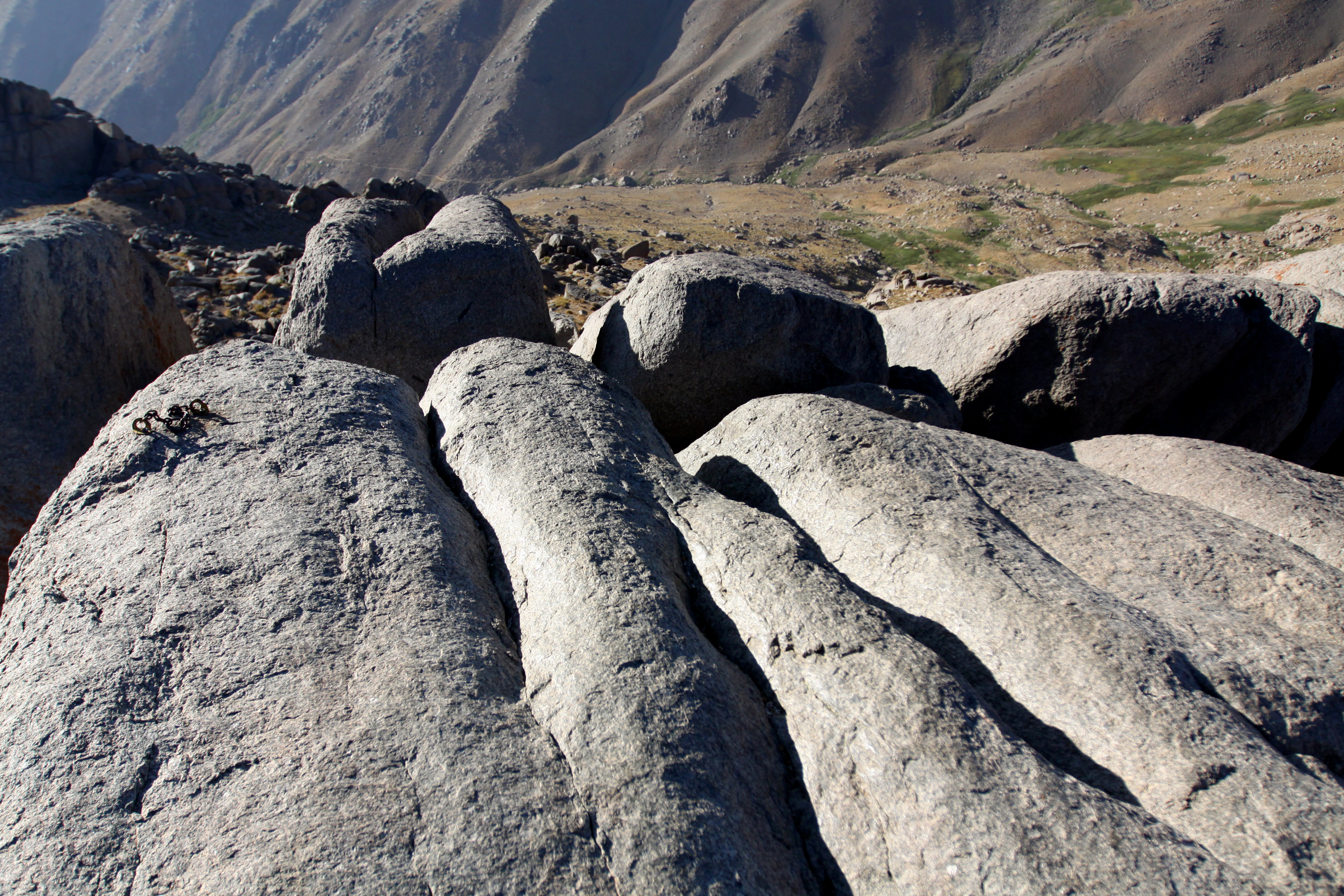
Alvand Summit, Hamedan, Iran

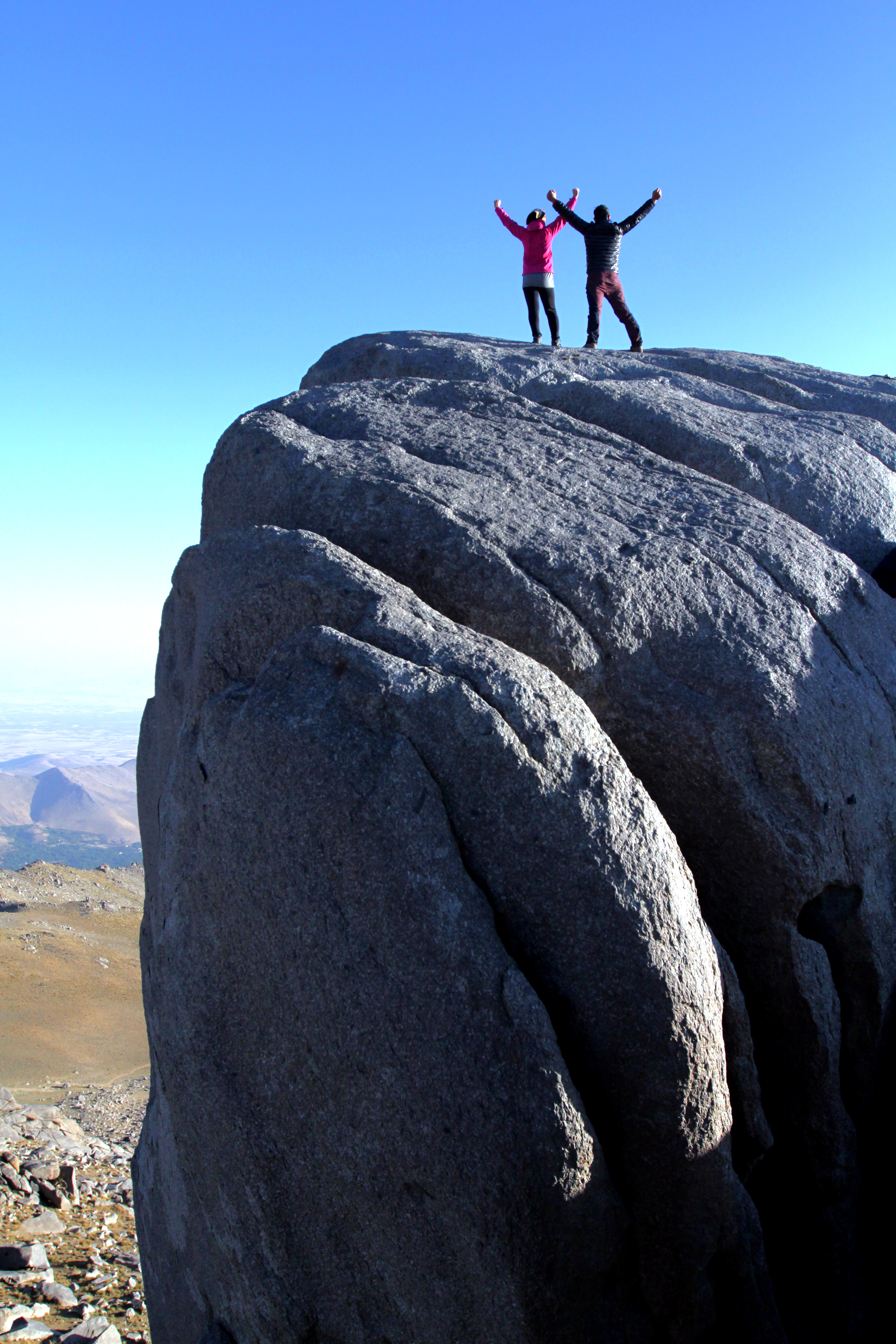
Summit

== See also ==
- List of mountains in Iran
- List of ultras of West Asia
