= García de Silva Figueroa =

Spanish diplomat and traveller (1550–1624)

García de Silva y Figueroa
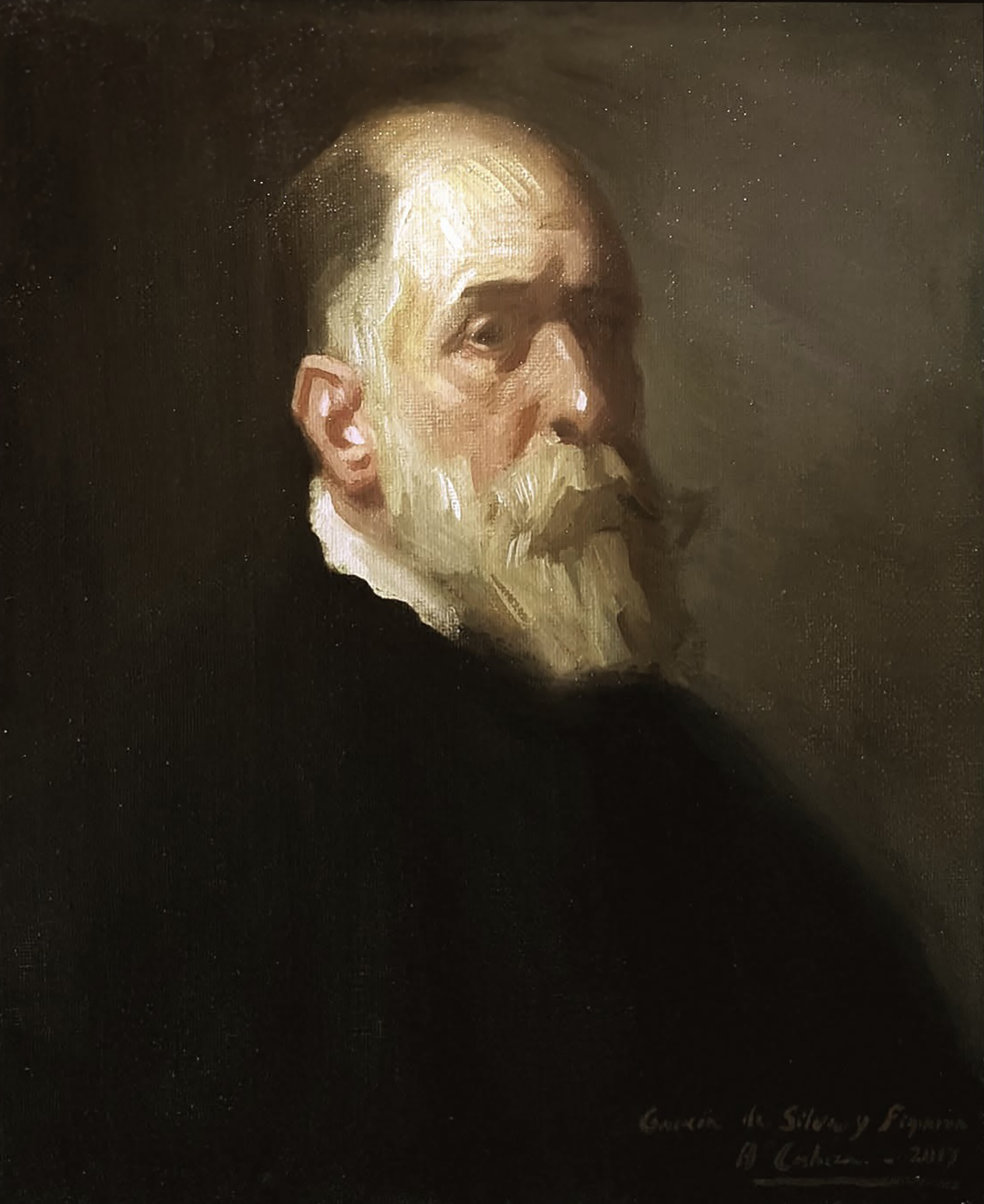
- Portrait of García de Silva y Figueroa by Alejandro Cabeza (2017).
- Born: December 29, 1550; Zafra, Spain
- Died: July 22, 1624 (aged 73); At sea, near Goa
- Occupations: Diplomat, explorer, writer
- Known for: Identifying the ruins of Persepolis; Embassy to Persia
- Movement: Spanish Golden Age

Don García de Silva Figueroa (December 29, 1550 – July 22, 1624) was a Spanish diplomat, and the first Western traveller to correctly identify the ruins of Takht-e Jamshid in Persia as the location of Persepolis, the ancient capital of the Achaemenid Empire and one of the great cities of antiquity.

== Life and work ==
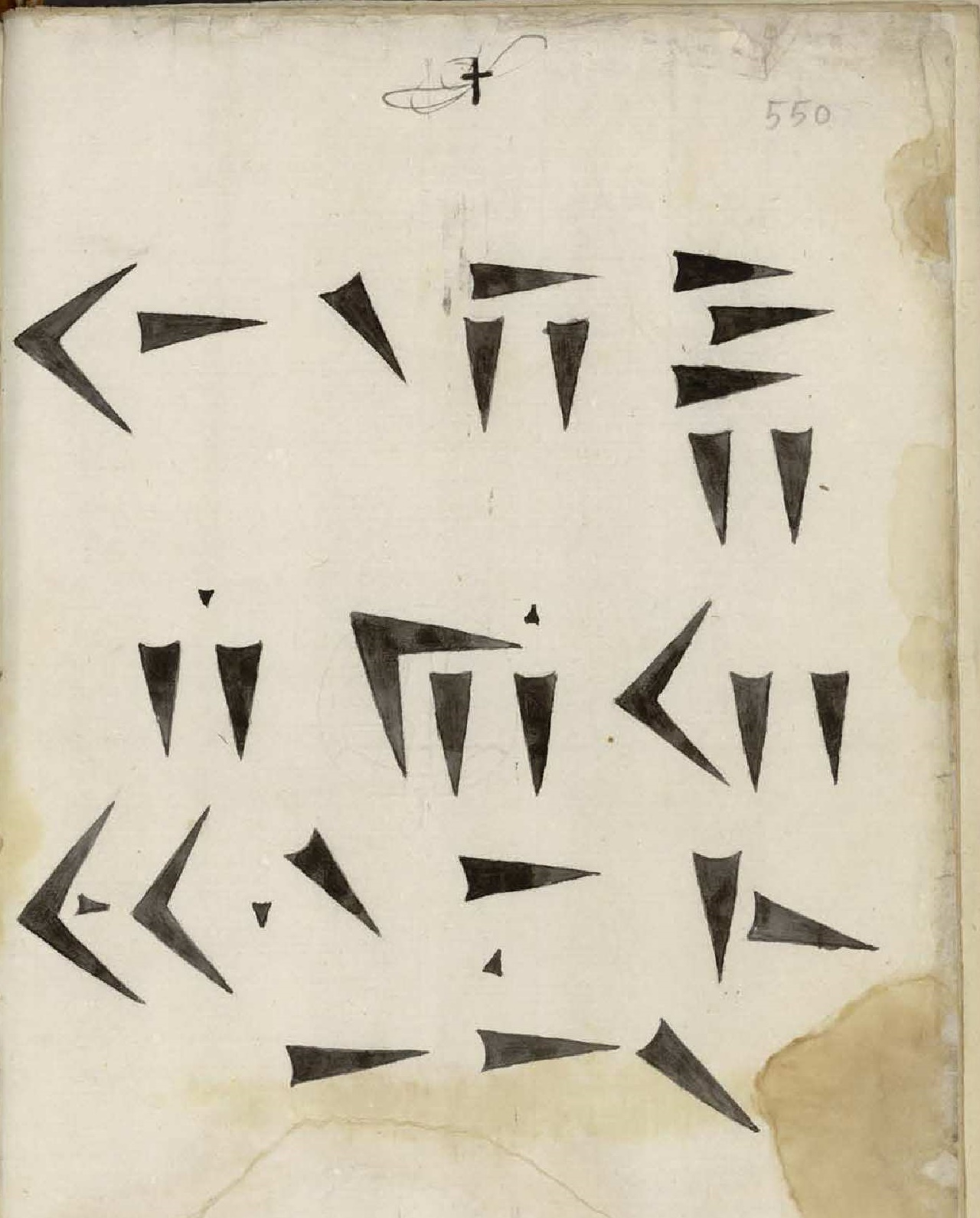
Sketch of cuneiform symbols from De Silva's notebook

De Silva was born in Zafra in the Spanish province of Badajoz. He served in the military in Flanders, and later was appointed governor of Badajoz. In 1612, Philip III, King of both Spain and Portugal, chose De Silva as his ambassador to the court of Shah Abbas, the Safavid monarch. Before he could reach Persia, however, De Silva was detained in Goa due to his strong disagreements with its Portuguese viceroy, and he did not arrive at his destination until October 1617.

De Silva's embassy was Philip III's return to the two Abbas I had sent to him shortly before, one of them in the person of the Englishman Robert Shirley and the other in the ones of the Persian Dengiz Beg and the Portuguese Augustinian friar Antonio de Gouvea.

During his stay in Persia, De Silva dealt with various diplomatic issues of importance, including the sealing of an alliance against the Ottoman Empire, a longstanding enemy of the three powers involved: Persia, Portugal and Spain.

De Silva travelled extensively throughout Persia, visiting the cities of Shiraz, Qom and Isfahan among others. He went to see the ruins of Persepolis, and described its splendours in a vivid letter to Alfonso de la Cueva, marqués de Bedmar. This letter made a great impression in the learned circles of Europe, and was quickly translated into Latin and English. In Isfahan he met the Italian traveller Pietro della Valle, who later went to Goa following the way De Silva had done to reach there.

On his travels, De Silva had amassed a large collection of rare art objects; these he tried to take home with him to Spain when his sojourn ended in 1619. He wrote a full account of his travels under the title Totius legationis suae et Indicarum rerum Persidisque commentarii. It was translated into French by the Dutchman Abraham de Wicquefort in 1667. The original manuscript is preserved today in the National Library in Madrid, and was published completely for the first time there in 1903.

De Silva's memoirs contain a great deal of detailed information relating to Persian geography, history and culture. He described, among many other things, the funerary practices of the Zoroastrians, the sport of organized bull-fighting in Persian towns, and the cultivation of date palms in southern Iran. His narrative is now regarded as a valuable source document on early 17th-century Persia.

De Silva's return trip to Spain was eventful and frustrating. He reached Ormuz and Goa in 1621, and then, in 1622, Mozambique, but too late in season to round the Cape of Good Hope he had to go back again to Goa. When, after a long delay, he was able to re-embark for Spain, he died at sea before reaching his destination.

== Fictional character ==
García de Silva y Figueroa is the protagonist of the horror and mystery story Denn die Toten segeln schnell ("Because the dead sail quickly"), by the Spanish writer Salomé Guadalupe Ingelmo. The text is part of the anthology Lo Siniestro.

== See also ==
- Robert Shirley
- Thomas Shirley
- Anthony Shirley

== Bibliography ==
- De Silva Figueroa, Garcia (1667), L'Ambassade de D. Garcias de Silva Figueroa en Perse..., translated by De Wicquefort, Abraham, Paris: Louis Billaine.
- Serrano Sanz, M., ed. (1903). Comentarios de Don García de Silva y Figueroa de la embajada que de parte del rey de España don Felipe III hizo al rey Xa Abas de Persia (in Spanish). Sociedad de Bibliófilos Españoles. Archived from the original on 2024-07-10.
- Gil, Luis (1989). Epistolario diplomático de D. García De Silva y Figueroa (in Spanish). Institución Cultural El Brocense. ISBN 84-86854-23-7.
- Alonso, Carlos (1993). La embajada a Persia de D. García De Silva y Figueroa (1612-1624) (in Spanish). Diputación Provincial de Badajoz. ISBN 84-7796-851-9.
