= Waddy (disambiguation) =

A waddy is an Australian Aboriginal hardwood club.

Waddy may also refer to:

== People ==
- Waddy (surname)
- Waddy Butler Wood (1869-1944), American architect
- Watkin Tudor Jones (born 1974), South African musician
- Waddy Wachtel (born 1947), American musician and record producer

== Other uses ==
- Acacia peuce, an Australian tree
- Waddy, Kentucky, United States, an unincorporated community within Shelby County
- Waddy House, a historic home in Maryland, United States

== See also ==
- Stack Waddy, a British blues rock band
- Wadi (disambiguation)
