= Badie =

Badie or Badié may refer to:

== Places ==
- Badié, a village in the Bagassi Department of Balé Province in southern Burkina Faso
- Le Badie, a village in Tuscany, Italy

== People ==
=== Given name ===
- Badie Khairi (1893–1966), Egyptian playwright
- Badie Aouk (born 1995), Moroccan footballer
- Badie Ovnteni (born 1967), Nigerien flyweight boxer

=== Surname ===
- Asad Badie, Afghani pop singer
- Bertrand Badie (born 1950), French political scientist and international relations specialist, emeritus professor
- Gbagnon Badie (born 1992), Ivorian footballer
- Laurence Badie (1928–2024), French actress
- Mohamed Badie, eighth General Guide (chairman) of the Egyptian Muslim Brotherhood
- Peter Badie (1925–2023), American jazz bass player
- Tyler Badie (born 1999), American football player
- Vincent Badie (1902–1989), French lawyer and politician
- Florence La Badie (1888–1917), American actress of the silent film era

== See also ==
- Badi (disambiguation)
- Badis (disambiguation)
