= Castellina =

Castellina is the name of two cities in Tuscany, Italy:

- Castellina in Chianti
- Castellina Marittima
