= Badi =

Badi may refer to:

== People ==
- Aquiles Badi (1894–1976), Argentine painter
- Badi II (1645–1681), ruler of the Kingdom of Sennar
- Badi III (1692–1716), ruler of the Kingdom of Sennar
- Badi IV (1724–1762), ruler of the Kingdom of Sennar
- Badí‘ (Mírzá Áqá Buzurg-i-Nishapuri) (1852–1869), an early Bahá'í martyr from Persia
- Badi' Khayri (1893–1966), Egyptian folk lyricist and playwright
- Badi-al-Molk Mirza (died after 1891), Qajar prince, statesman and author
- Badi people, Nepal
- Badi (caste), a scheduled caste found in Uttar Pradesh
- Chimène Badi (born 1982), French singer

== Places ==
- Badi, Dholpur, an administrative subdivision of Dholpur district, Western India
- Badi, Guinea
- Badi, Iran, a village in Khuzestan Province, Iran
- Badi, Nauru, a city in the Republic of Nauru
- Badi, Raisen, a town in Madhya Pradesh, India
- Badi, Sudan, a medieval city on the west coast of the Red Sea
- El Badi Palace, a Moroccan palace built in 1578

== Others ==
- Al-Badīʿ, one of the names of God in Islam
- Badi' calendar, used in Bábism and the Bahá'í Faith
- Badi (film), a 1984 Turkish film
- Badi language, a language of Northwestern Iran
- Badi (magazine), a Japanese magazine for gay men
- Badi Mata, one of the Hindu mahavidyas
- Badi Panthulu, a 1972 Telugu film
- Badi' poetry

== See also ==
- Badi' al-Zaman (disambiguation), multiple people
- Badis (disambiguation)
- Badie (disambiguation)
- Bari (disambiguation)
- Vadi (disambiguation)
- Wadi (disambiguation)
