= Wadi (disambiguation) =

A wadi (from Arabic: وادي wādī) is a dry river or its valley.

Wadi may also refer to:

- Waddy, a hardwood Aboriginal Australian club
- WADI, a radio station in Corinth, Mississippi, United States
- Wadi, a fictional race in the Star Trek universe, see "Move Along Home"
- Wadi, a minor character on The Secret Saturdays
- Wadi, Karnataka, a town in India
- Wadi, Maharashtra, a town in India
- Wadi of the Maldives, a 13th-century Sultan of the Maldives
- Wadi', Arabic masculine given name

== See also ==
- Silicon Wadi, a region in Israel known for its high-tech industries
- Wadiya, a fictitious state in The Dictator film
- Vadi (disambiguation)
- Waddy (disambiguation)
- Badi (disambiguation)
