= Terriccio =

- Frazione
- Location of Terriccio in Italy
- Coordinates: 43°22′55″N 10°32′29″E
- Country: Italy
- Region: Tuscany
- Province: Pisa (PI)
- Comune: Castellina Marittima
- Elevation: 150 m (490 ft)

Population (2011)
  - Total: 7
- Time zone: UTC+1 (CET)
  - Summer (DST): UTC+2 (CEST)
- Postal code: 56040
- Dialing code: (+39) 050

Terriccio is a village in Tuscany, central Italy, administratively a frazione of the comune of Castellina Marittima, province of Pisa. At the time of the 2001 census its population was 13.

Terriccio is about 60 km from Pisa and 18 km from Castellina Marittima.
