= Malandrone =

- Frazione
- Location of Malandrone in Italy
- Coordinates: 43°22′38″N 10°30′15″E
- Country: Italy
- Region: Tuscany
- Province: Pisa (PI)
- Comune: Castellina Marittima
- Elevation: 54 m (177 ft)

Population (2011)
  - Total: 41
- Time zone: UTC+1 (CET)
  - Summer (DST): UTC+2 (CEST)
- Postal code: 56040
- Dialing code: (+39) 050

Malandrone is a village in Tuscany, central Italy, administratively a frazione of the comune of Castellina Marittima, province of Pisa. At the time of the 2001 census its population was 32.

Malandrone is about 50 km from Pisa and 10 km from Castellina Marittima.
