= Fengite =

Translucent marble or alabaster sheet

Fengite is a translucent sheet of marble or alabaster used during the Early Middle Ages for windows instead of glass.
