= Vadi =

Vadi may refer to:

== People ==
- Vadi (surname), list of people with the surname
- Fillipo Vadi, author of the Italian treatise on fighting De Arte Gladiatoria Dimicandi

== Other uses ==
- Vadi (music), a musical note in Indian classical music
- Vadi, Estonia, a village in Estonia
- Wade (folklore) (Norse: Vaði), a Germanic mythological character

== See also ==
- Wadi (disambiguation)
- Badi (disambiguation)
