= Vadi (surname) =

Vadi is a surname. Notable people with the surname include:

- Maaja Vadi (born 1955), Estonian management scholar and psychologist
- Mohammad Taher Vadi (born 1989), Iranian volleyball player
- Quinto Vadi (1921–2014), Italian gymnast
- Urmas Vadi (born 1977), Estonian writer

== See also ==
- Vadi (disambiguation)
