= Waddy (surname) =

Waddy is a surname. Notable people with the surname include:

- Billy Waddy (1954-2022), former professional American football player
- Charis Waddy (1909–2004), Australian-born British author, lecturer and Islamic scholar
- Gar Waddy (Edgar Lloyd Waddy, 1879–1963), Australian cricketer
- Harriet Waddy (1904–1999), American military officer
- John Waddy (disambiguation)
- John Lloyd Waddy (1916–1987), senior officer and aviator in the Royal Australian Air Force (RAAF)
- Jude Waddy (born 1975), former professional American football player
- Mick Waddy (Ernest Frederick Waddy, 1880–1958), Australian cricketer and clergyman
- Nan Waddy (1915–2015), Australian psychiatrist
- Ray Waddy (born 1956), former American football player
- Samuel Danks Waddy (1830–1902), English politician
- Percival Stacy Waddy 1875–1937), Australian cricketer and clergyman
