= Badis =

Badis may refer to:

- Badis (town), a ruined town in Morocco
- Badis (fish), a genus of fishes in the family Badidae

== See also ==
- Badi (disambiguation)
- Badie (disambiguation)
