= Alabaster =

Lightly colored, translucent, and soft calcium minerals, typically gypsum

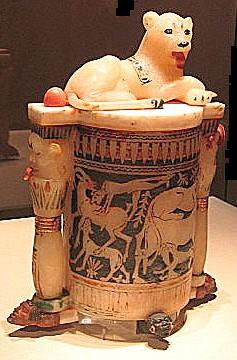
Calcite alabaster: The tomb of Tutankhamun (d. 1323 BC) contained a practical objet d’art, a cosmetics jar made of Egyptian alabaster, which features a lid surmounted by a lioness (goddess Bast).

Alabaster is a soft rock used for carvings and as a source of plaster powder. Archaeologists, geologists, and the stone industry have different definitions for the word alabaster. In archaeology, the term alabaster includes objects and artifacts made from two different minerals: (i) the fine-grained, massive type of gypsum, and (ii) the fine-grained, banded type of calcite.

Chemically, gypsum is a hydrous sulfate of calcium, whereas calcite is a carbonate of calcium. As types of alabaster, gypsum and calcite have similar properties, such as light color, translucence, and soft stones that can be carved and sculpted; thus the historical use and application of alabaster for the production of carved, decorative artefacts and objets d’art. Calcite alabaster also is known as onyx-marble, Egyptian alabaster, and Oriental alabaster, which terms usually describe either a compact, banded travertine stone or a stalagmitic limestone colored with swirling bands of cream and brown.

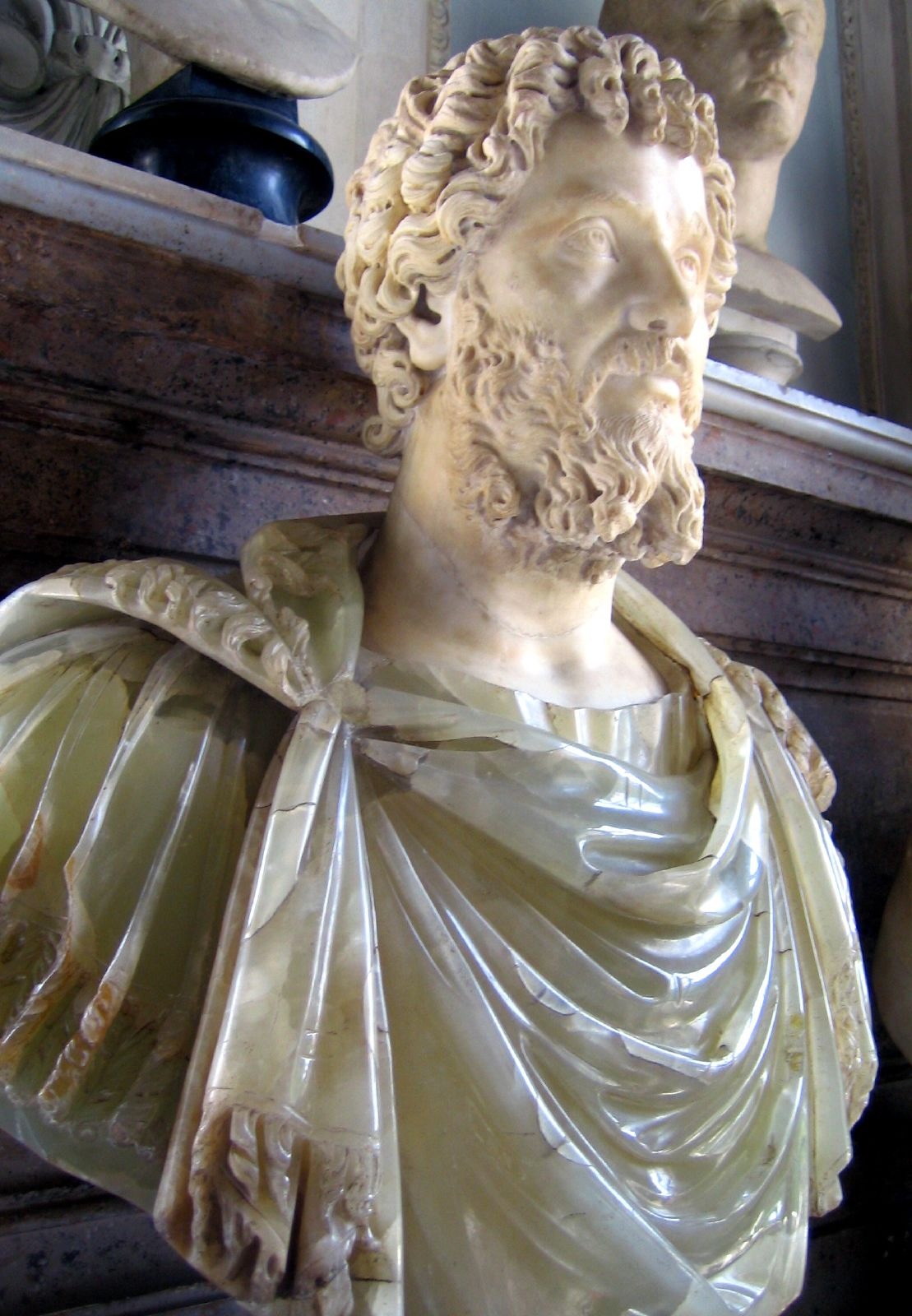
Alabaster artefact: A composite bust of the Emperor Septimius Severus; the head is marble and the bust is alabaster.

In general, both ancient and modern alabaster is likely to be calcite in the wider Middle East, including Egypt and Mesopotamia, and gypsum in Europe and the Americas. Both are easy to work and slightly soluble in water. They have been used for making a variety of indoor artwork and carving, as they will not survive long outdoors.

The two types are readily distinguished by their different hardness: gypsum alabaster (Mohs hardness 1.5 to 2) is so soft that a fingernail scratches it, while calcite (Mohs hardness 3) cannot be scratched in this way but yields to a knife. Moreover, calcite alabaster, being a carbonate, effervesces when treated with hydrochloric acid while gypsum alabaster remains almost unaffected.

== Etymology ==
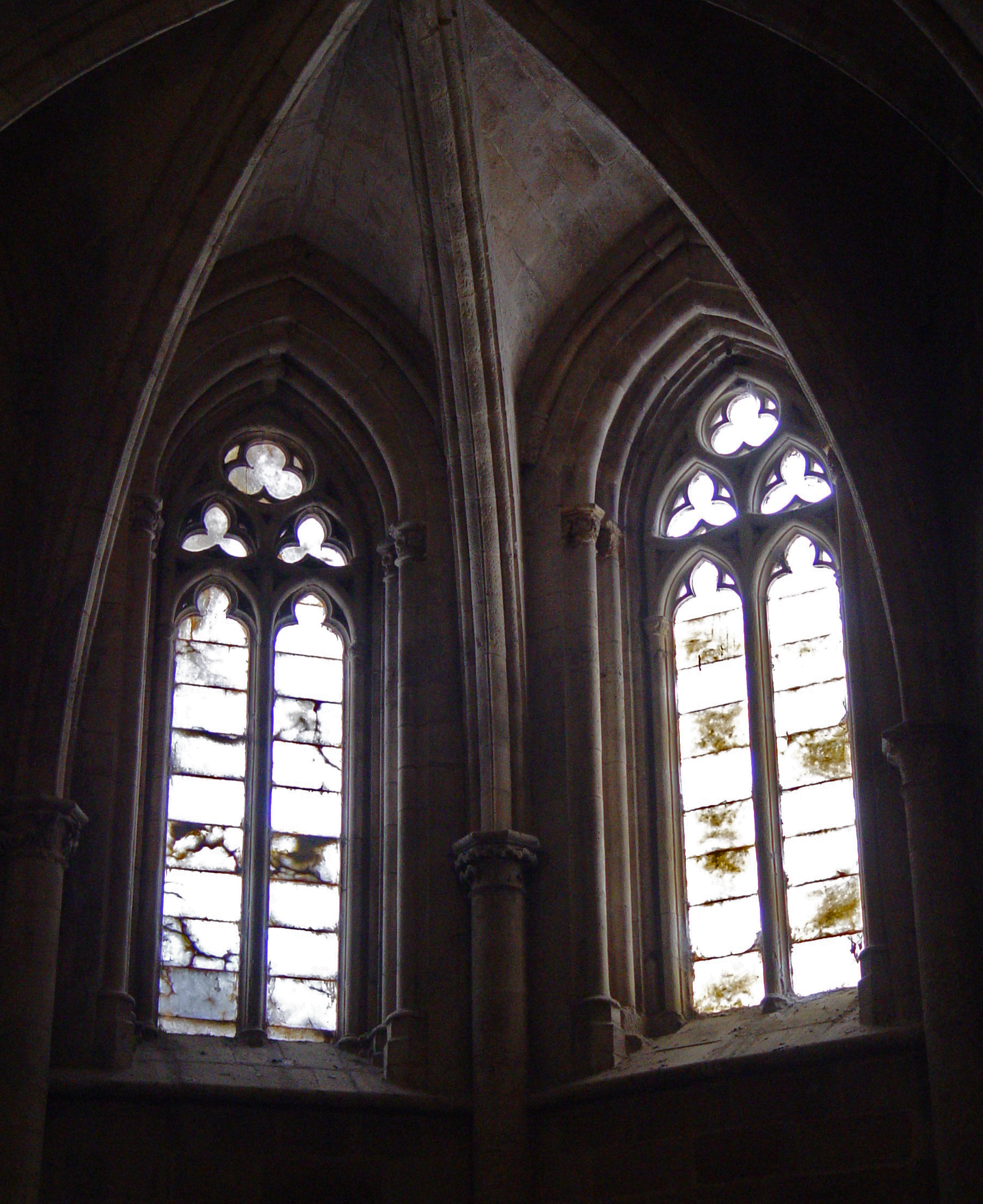
Alabaster windows in the Church of Santa Maria la Mayor of Morella, Spain (built 13th–16th centuries)

The English word "alabaster" was borrowed from Old French alabastre, in turn derived from Latin alabaster, and that from Greek ἀλάβαστρος (alábastros) or ἀλάβαστος (alábastos). The Greek words denoted a vase of alabaster.

The name may be derived further from ancient Egyptian a-labaste, which refers to vessels of the Egyptian goddess Bast. She was represented as a lioness and frequently depicted as such in figures placed atop these alabaster vessels. Ancient Roman authors Pliny the Elder and Ptolemy wrote that the stone used for ointment jars called alabastra came from a region of Egypt known as Alabastron or Alabastrites.

== Properties and usability ==
The purest alabaster is a snow-white material of fine uniform grain, but it often is associated with an oxide of iron, which produces brown clouding and veining in the stone. The coarser varieties of gypsum alabaster are converted by calcination into plaster of Paris, and are sometimes known as "plaster stone".

The softness of alabaster enables it to be carved readily into elaborate forms, but its solubility in water renders it unsuitable for outdoor work. If alabaster with a smooth, polished surface is washed with dishwashing liquid, it will become rough, dull and whiter, losing most of its translucency and lustre. The finer kinds of alabaster are employed largely as an ornamental stone, especially for ecclesiastical decoration and for the rails of staircases and halls. In contemporary applications, Egyptian calcite alabaster is still utilized by local artisans who employ traditional hand-carving methods. Due to its natural translucency, the stone is frequently shaped into decorative objects and lighting fixtures, such as lampshades and candle holders, allowing it to remain a relevant material in modern interior design.

== Modern processing ==
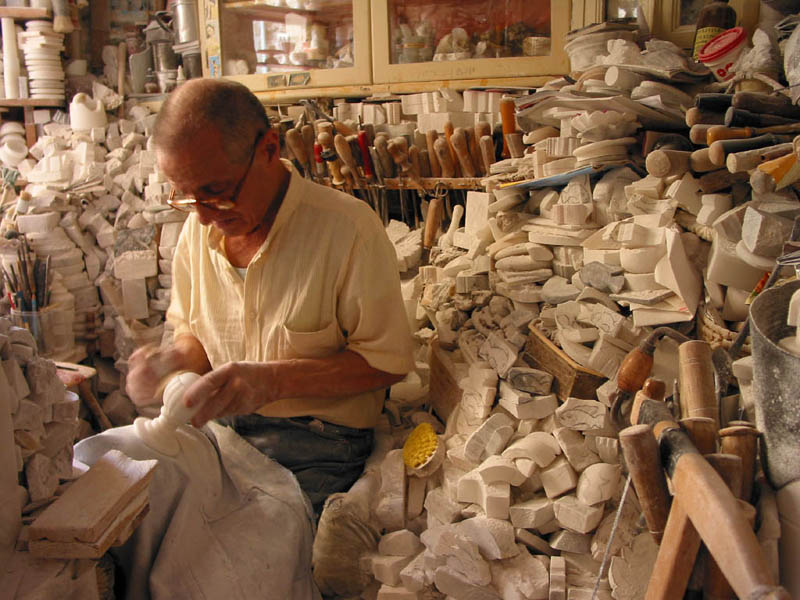
Alabaster workshop in Volterra in Tuscany, Italy

=== Working techniques ===
Alabaster is mined and then sold in blocks to alabaster workshops. There they are cut to the needed size ("squaring"), and then are processed in different techniques: turned on a lathe for round shapes, carved into three-dimensional sculptures, chiselled to produce low relief figures or decoration; and then given an elaborate finish that reveals its transparency, colour, and texture.

=== Marble imitation ===
In order to diminish the translucency of the alabaster and to produce an opacity suggestive of true marble, the statues are immersed in a bath of water and heated gradually—nearly to the boiling point—in an operation requiring great care, because if the temperature is not regulated carefully, the stone acquires a dead-white, chalky appearance. The effect of heating appears to be a partial dehydration of the gypsum. If properly treated, it closely resembles true marble and is known as "marmo di Castellina".

=== Dyeing ===
Alabaster is a porous stone and can be dyed into any colour or shade, a technique used for centuries. For this the stone needs to be fully immersed in various pigment solutions and heated to a specific temperature. The technique can be used to disguise alabaster. In this way an imitation of coral that is called "alabaster coral" is produced.

== Types, occurrence, history ==
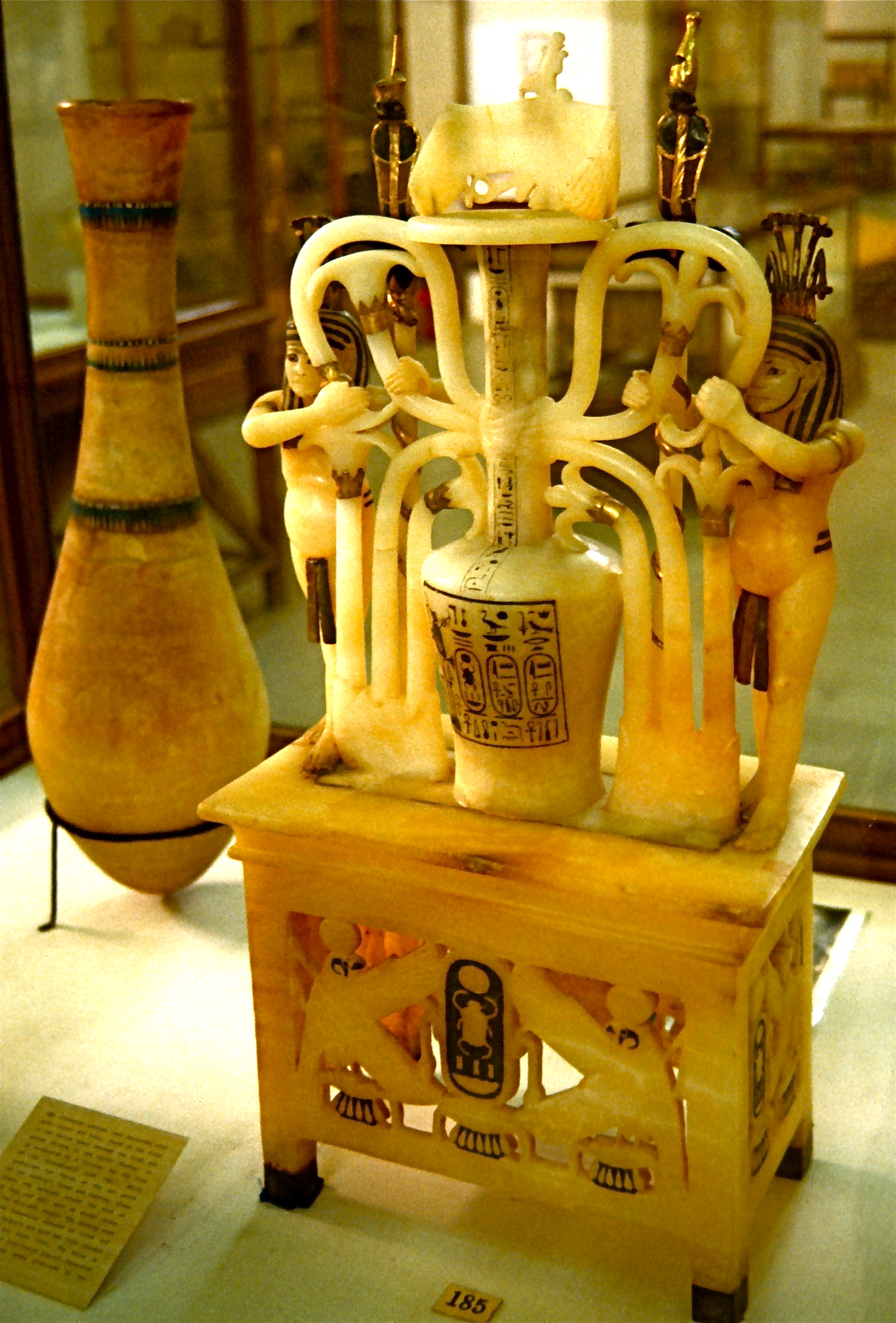
A calcite alabaster perfume jar from the tomb of Tutankhamun, d. 1323 BC

Typically only one type is sculpted in any particular cultural environment, but sometimes both have been worked to make similar pieces in the same place and time. This was the case with small flasks of the alabastron type made in Cyprus from the Bronze Age into the Classical period.

=== Window panels ===
When cut into thin sheets, alabaster is translucent enough to be used for small windows. It was used for this purpose in Byzantine churches and later in medieval ones, especially in Italy. Large sheets of Aragonese gypsum alabaster are used extensively in the Cathedral of Our Lady of the Angels, dedicated in 2002 by the Los Angeles, California, Archdiocese. The cathedral incorporates special cooling to prevent the panes from overheating and turning opaque. The ancients used the calcite type, while the modern Los Angeles cathedral employs gypsum alabaster. There are also multiple examples of alabaster windows in ordinary village churches and monasteries in northern Spain.

=== Calcite alabaster ===
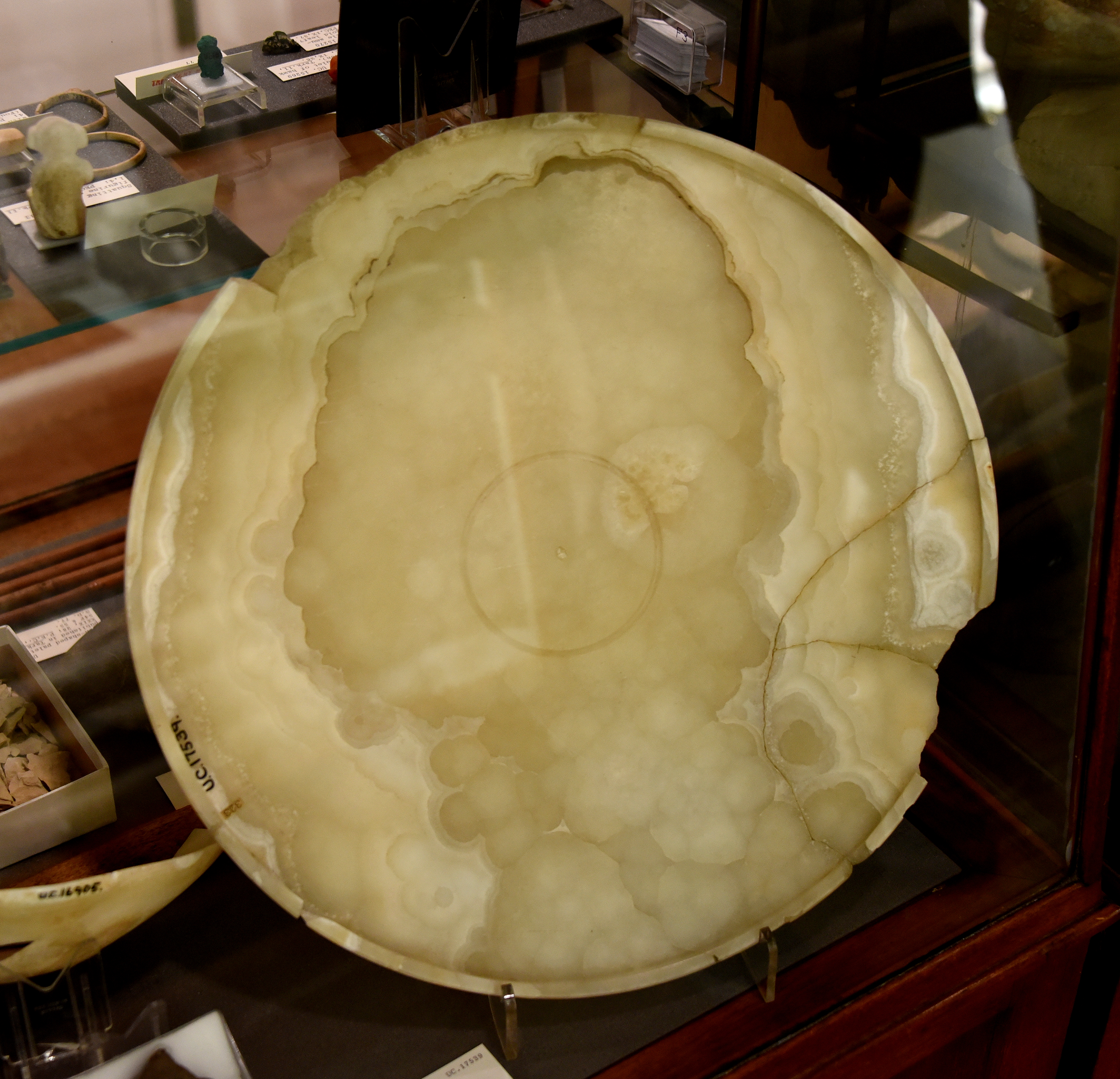
Calcite dish from the Ancient Egyptian tomb of "U", Semerkhet

Calcite alabaster, harder than the gypsum variety, was used in ancient Egypt and the wider Middle East (except Assyrian palace reliefs), and also in modern times. It is found as either a stalagmitic deposit from the floor and walls of limestone caverns, or as a kind of travertine, similarly deposited in springs of calcareous water. Its deposition in successive layers gives rise to the banded appearance that the marble often shows on cross-section, from which its name is derived: onyx-marble or alabaster-onyx, or sometimes simply (and wrongly) as onyx.
A defining physical characteristic of calcite alabaster is its light-diffusing capability. When carved to specific thicknesses, the stone scatters light evenly across its surface, preventing harsh shadows. This semi-translucent property makes it highly suitable for illuminated interior pieces.

==== Egypt and the Middle East ====
Egyptian alabaster has been worked extensively near Suez and Assiut.

This stone variety is the "alabaster" of the ancient Egyptians and Bible and is often termed Oriental alabaster, since the early examples came from the Far East. The Greek name alabastrites is said to be derived from the town of Alabastron in Egypt, where the stone was quarried. The locality may owe its name to the mineral; though the origin of the mineral name is obscure

Ancient Roman historian Pliny the Elder, while writing about the origins of precious stones, discusses the Alabastrum stone (alabastrites). According to him, this stone derived from a distinct town Alabastrum, located near Upper Egypt's ancient capital Thebes. Before that, Herodotus referred to myrrh alabastron (μύρου ἀλάβαστρον) containers for perfumes and oils. The name of these containers, very widespread in Egypt and the ancient Mediterranean, was clearly linked with the name of the stone.

The "Oriental" alabaster was highly esteemed for making small perfume bottles or ointment vases called alabastra; the vessel name has been suggested as a possible source of the mineral name. In Egypt, craftsmen used alabaster for canopic jars and various other sacred and sepulchral objects. The sarcophagus of Seti I, found in his tomb near Thebes, is on display in Sir John Soane's Museum, London; it is carved in a single block of translucent calcite alabaster from Alabastron.

Algerian onyx-marble has been quarried largely in the province of Oran.

Calcite alabaster was quarried in ancient Israel in the cave known as the Twins Cave near Beit Shemesh. Herod used this alabaster for baths in his palaces.

==== North America ====
In Mexico, there are famous deposits of a delicate green variety at La Pedrara, in the district of Tecali, near Puebla. Onyx-marble occurs also in the district of Tehuacán and at several localities in the US including California, Arizona, Utah, Colorado and Virginia.

=== Gypsum alabaster ===
Gypsum alabaster is softer than calcite alabaster. It was used primarily in medieval Europe, and is also used in modern times.

==== Ancient and Classical Near East ====
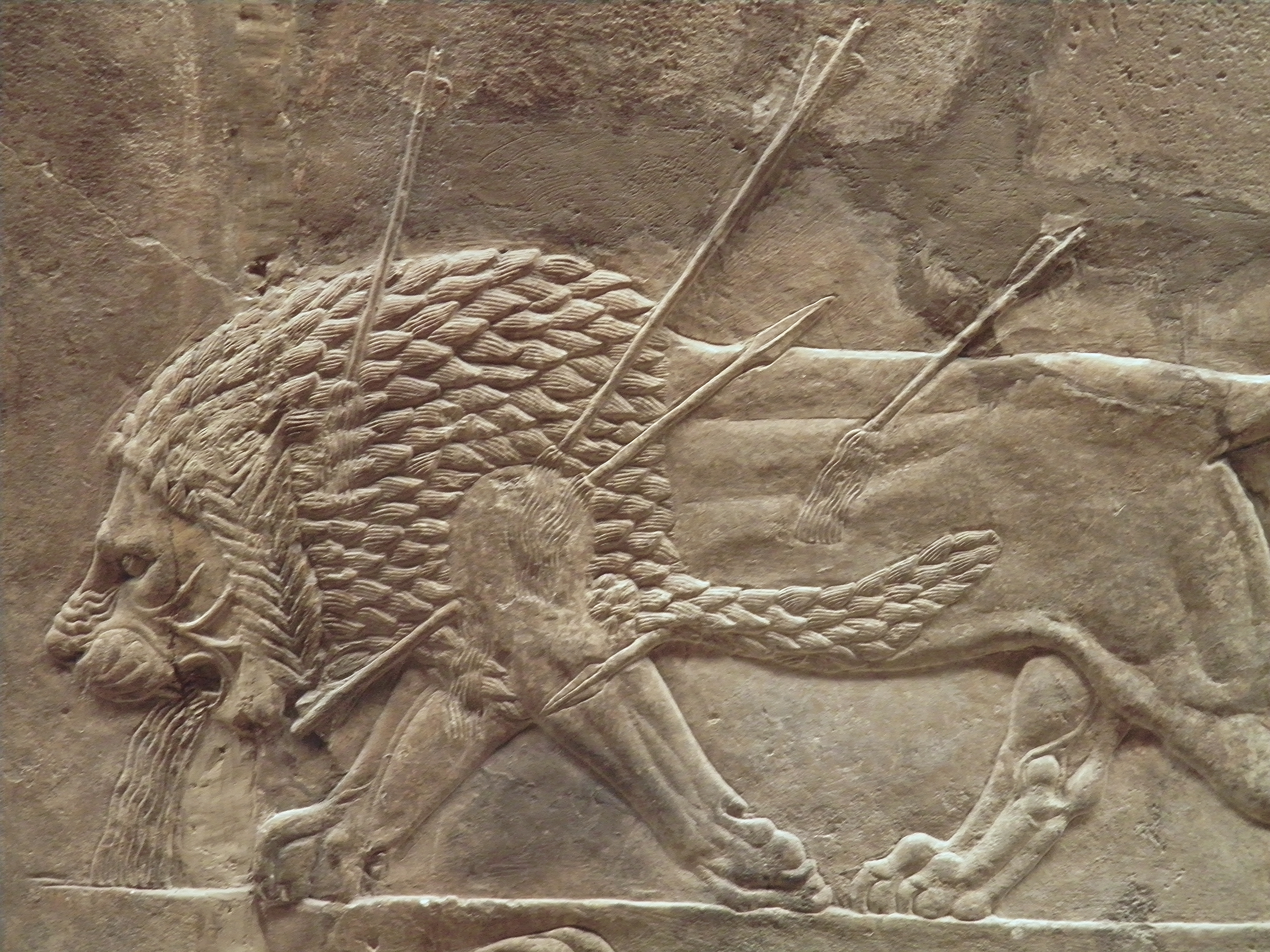
Wounded lion, detail from the Lion Hunt of Ashurbanipal, 7th century BC, British Museum

"Mosul marble" is a kind of gypsum alabaster found in the north of modern Iraq, which was used for the Assyrian palace reliefs of the 9th to 7th centuries BC; these are the largest type of alabaster sculptures to have been regularly made. The relief is very low and the carving detailed, but large rooms were lined with continuous compositions on slabs around 7 feet (2.1 m) high. The Lion Hunt of Ashurbanipal and military Lachish reliefs, both 7th century BC and in the British Museum, are some of the best known.

Gypsum alabaster was widely used for small sculpture for indoor use in the ancient world, especially in ancient Egypt and Mesopotamia. Fine detail could be obtained in a material with an attractive finish without iron or steel tools. Alabaster was used for vessels dedicated for use in the cult of the deity Bast in the culture of the ancient Egyptians, and thousands of gypsum alabaster artifacts dating to the late 4th millennium BC also have been found in Tell Brak (modern Nagar), in Syria.

In Mesopotamia, gypsum alabaster was the material of choice for figures of deities and devotees in temples, as in a figure believed to represent the deity Abu dating to the first half of the 3rd millennium BC, which is kept in New York.

==== Aragon, Spain ====
Much of the world's alabaster is extracted from the centre of the Ebro Valley in Aragon, Spain, which has the world's largest known exploitable deposits. There are two separate sites in Aragon, both are located in Tertiary basins. The most important site is the Fuentes-Azaila area, in the Tertiary Ebro Basin. The other is the Calatayud-Teruel Basin, which divides the Iberian Range in two main sectors (NW and SE).

The abundance of Aragonese alabaster was crucial for its use in architecture, sculpture and decoration. There is no record of use by pre-Roman cultures, so the first ones to use alabaster from Aragon may have been the Romans, who produced vessels from alabaster following the Greek and Egyptian models. It seems that since the reconstruction of the Roman Wall in Zaragoza in the 3rd century AD with alabaster, the use of this material became common in building for centuries. Muslim Saraqusta (Zaragoza) was also called "Medina Albaida", the White City, due to the appearance of its alabaster walls and palaces, which stood out among gardens, groves and orchards by the Ebro and Huerva Rivers.

The oldest remains in the Aljafería Palace, together with other interesting elements like capitals, reliefs and inscriptions, were made using alabaster, but it was during the artistic and economic blossoming of the Renaissance that Aragonese alabaster reached its golden age. In the 16th century sculptors in Aragon chose alabaster for their best works. They were adept at exploiting its lighting qualities and generally speaking the finished art pieces retained their natural color.

==== Volterra (Tuscany) ====
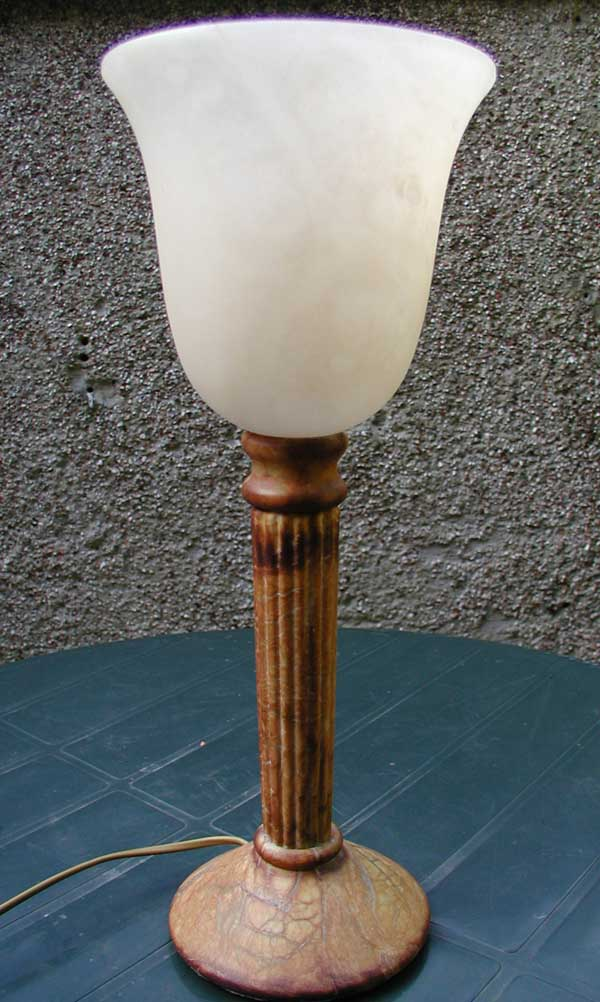
Uplighter lamp, white and brown Italian alabaster, base diameter 13 cm (20th century)

In modern Europe, the centre of the alabaster trade is Florence, Italy. Tuscan alabaster occurs in nodular masses embedded in limestone, interstratified with marls of Miocene and Pliocene age. The mineral is worked largely by means of underground galleries, in the district of Volterra. Several varieties are recognized—veined, spotted, clouded, agatiform, and others. The finest kind, obtained principally from Castellina, is sent to Florence for figure-sculpture, while the common kinds are carved locally, into vases, lights, and various ornamental objects. These items are objects of extensive trade, especially in Florence, Pisa, and Livorno.

In the 3rd century BC the Etruscans used the alabaster of Tuscany from the area of modern-day Volterra to produce funeral urns, possibly taught by Greek artists. During the Middle Ages the craft of alabaster was almost completely forgotten. A revival started in the mid-16th century, and until the beginning of the 17th century alabaster work was strictly artistic and did not expand to form a large industry.

In the 17th and 18th centuries production of artistic, high-quality Renaissance-style artifacts stopped altogether, replaced by less sophisticated, cheaper items better suited for large-scale production and commerce. The new industry prospered, but the reduced need for skilled craftsmen left few of them still working. The 19th century brought a boom to the industry, largely due to the "traveling artisans" who offered their wares to the palaces of Europe, as well as to America and the East.

In the 19th century new processing technology was also introduced, allowing for the production of custom-made, unique pieces, as well as the combination of alabaster with other materials. Apart from the newly developed craft, artistic work became again possible, chiefly by Volterran sculptor Albino Funaioli. After a short slump, the industry was revived again by the sale of mass-produced mannerist Expressionist sculptures. It was further enhanced in the 1920s by a new branch that created ceiling and wall lamps in the Art Deco style, culminating in participation at the 1925 International Exposition of Modern Industrial and Decorative Arts in Paris. Important names in the evolution of alabaster use after World War II are Volterran Umberto Borgna, the "first alabaster designer", and later on the architect and industrial designer Angelo Mangiarotti.

==== England and Wales ====
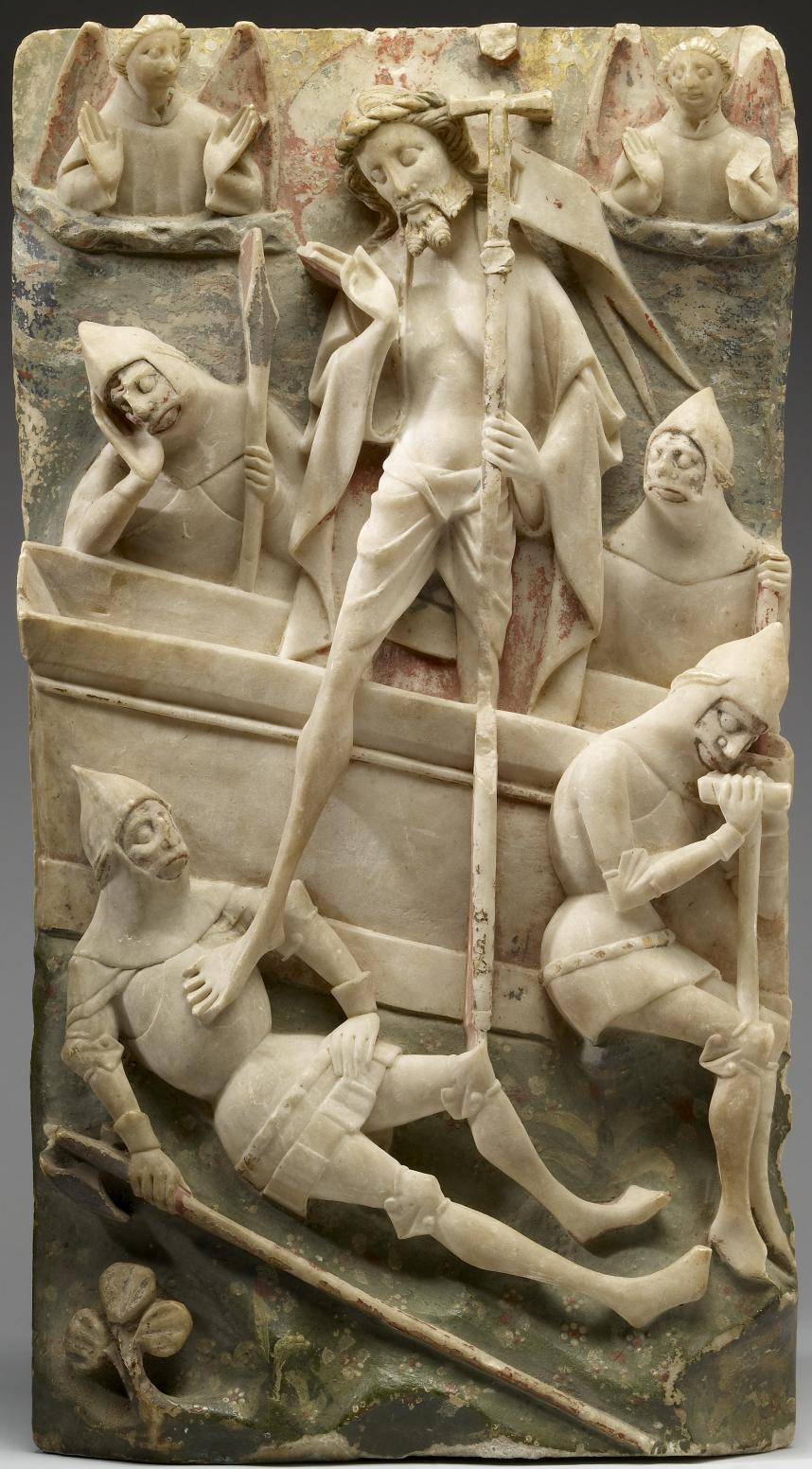
Resurrection of Christ, typical Nottingham alabaster panel from an altarpiece set, 1450–1490, showing remnants of its painted decoration. Walters Art Museum, Baltimore

Gypsum alabaster is a common mineral, which occurs in England in the Keuper marls of the Midlands, especially at Chellaston in Derbyshire, at Fauld in Staffordshire, and near Newark in Nottinghamshire. Deposits at all of these localities have been worked extensively.

In the 14th and 15th centuries the carving into small statues and sets of relief panels for altarpieces was a valuable local industry in Nottingham, as well as a major English export. These were usually painted, or partly painted. It was also used for the effigies, often life size, on tomb monuments, as the typical recumbent position suited the material's lack of strength, and it was cheaper and easier to work than good marble. After the English Reformation the making of altarpiece sets was discontinued, but funerary monument work in reliefs and statues continued.

In addition to the carvings still in Britain (particularly the Nottingham Castle Museum, British Museum, and Victoria and Albert Museum), trade in mineral alabaster (other than the antiques trade) is ongoing as far afield as the Musée de Cluny, Spain, and Scandinavia.

Alabaster is also found, in smaller quantity, at Watchet in Somerset, near Penarth in Glamorganshire, and elsewhere. In Cumbria it occurs largely in the New Red rocks, but at a lower geological horizon. The alabaster of Nottinghamshire and Derbyshire is found in thick nodular beds or "floors" in spheroidal masses known as "balls" or "bowls" and in smaller lenticular masses termed "cakes". At Chellaston, where the local alabaster is known as "Patrick", it has been worked into ornaments under the name of "Derbyshire spar"―a term more properly applied to fluorspar.

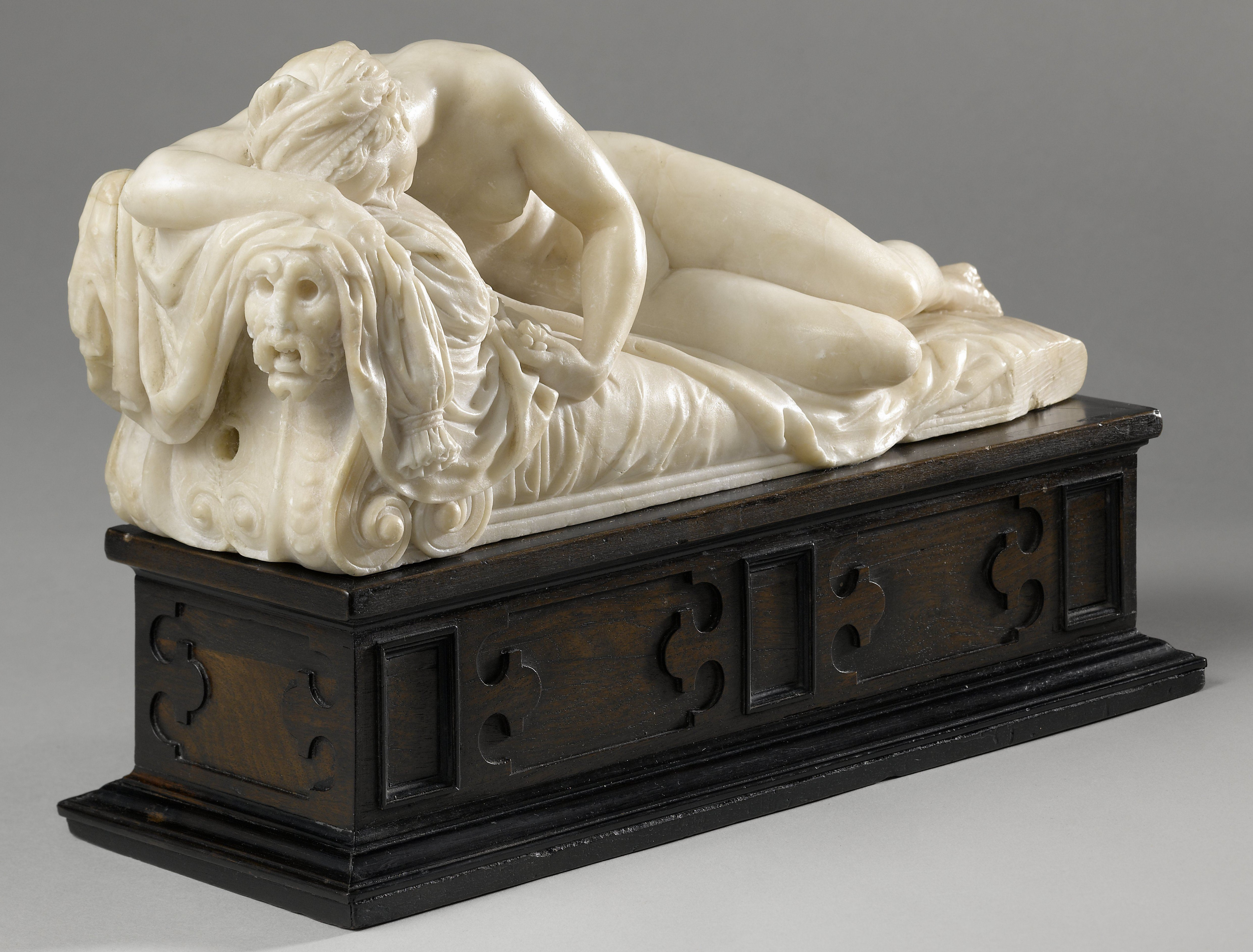
Attributed to Willem van den Broecke, Rijksmuseum

==== Black alabaster ====
Black alabaster is a rare anhydrite form of the gypsum-based mineral. The black form is found in only three veins in the world, one each in United States, Italy, and China.

Alabaster Caverns State Park, near Freedom, Oklahoma, is home to a natural gypsum cave in which much of the gypsum is in the form of alabaster. There are several types of alabaster found at the site, including pink, white, and the rare black alabaster.

=== Gallery ===
==== Ancient and Classical Near East ====
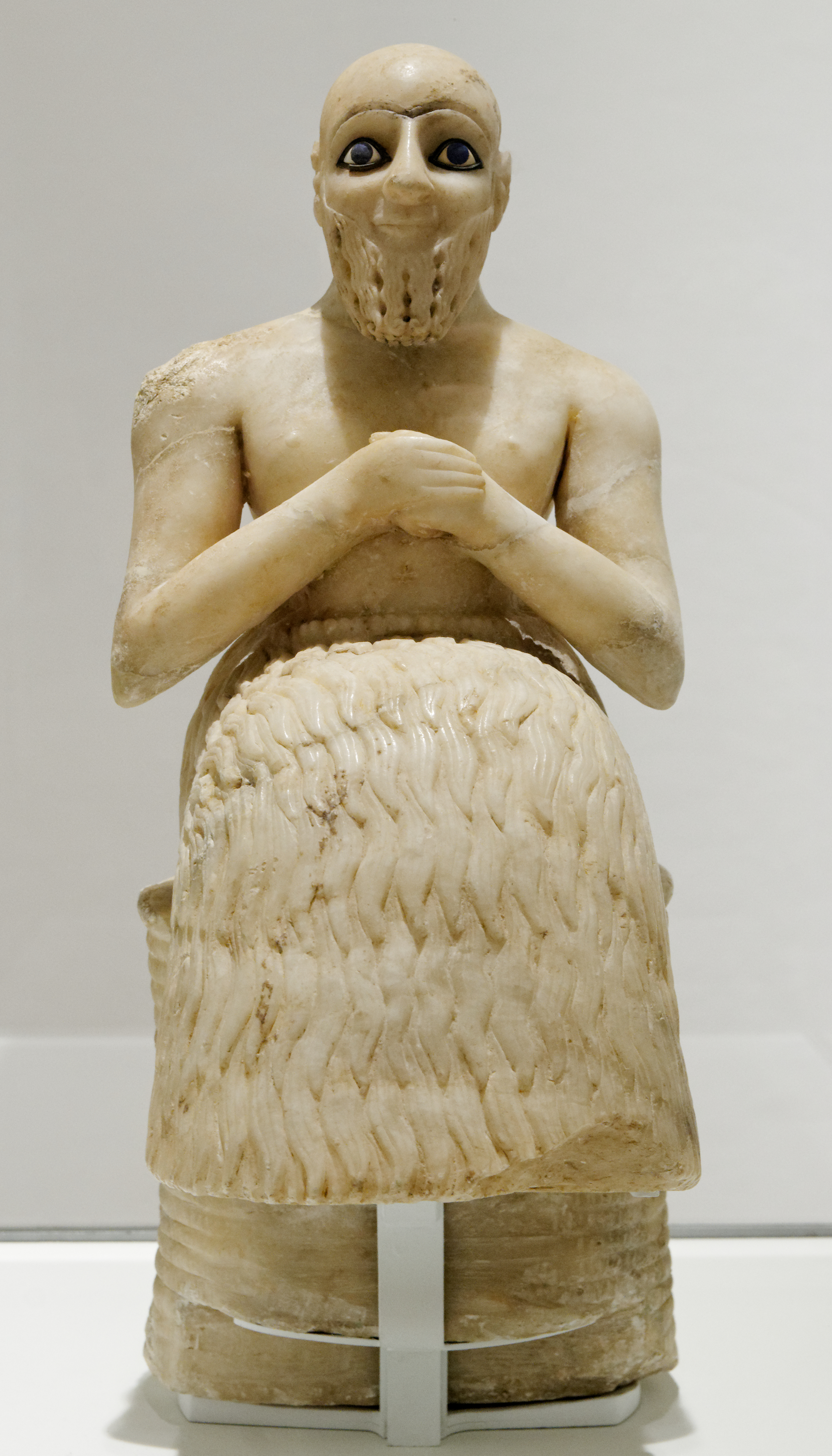
Statue of Ebih-Il, Mari on the Euphrates, made of gypsum alabaster (25th century BC)

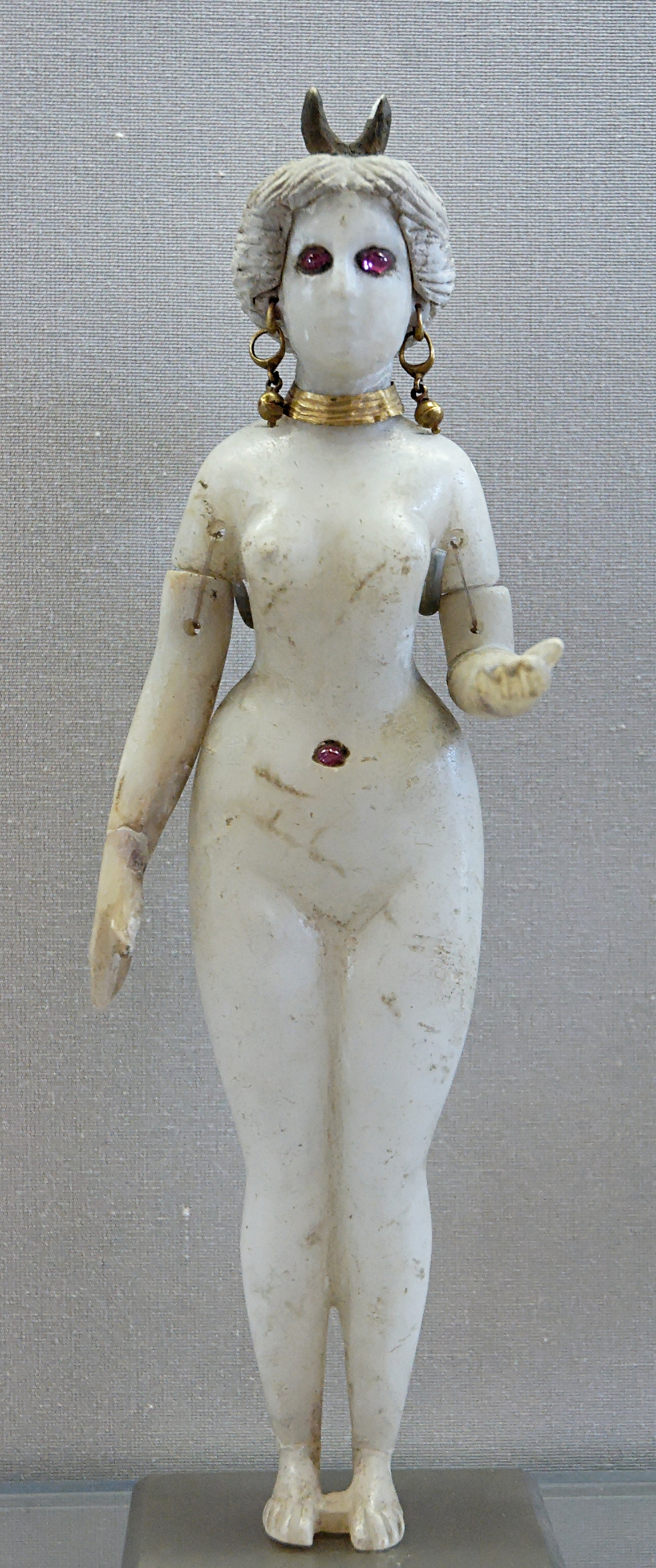
Necropolis of Hillah, near Babylon. Alabaster, gold, terracotta and rubies. Musée du Louvre

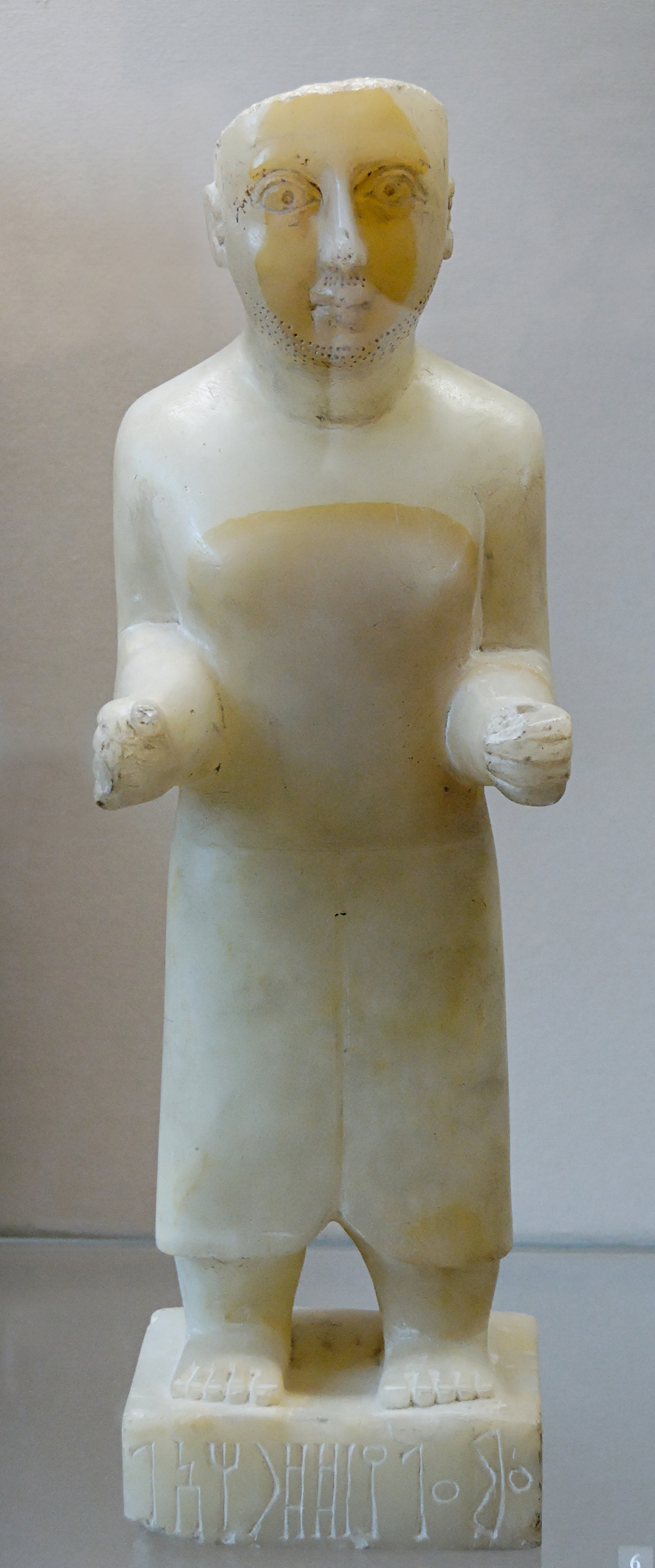
Alabaster statue, Yemen (1st century BC)

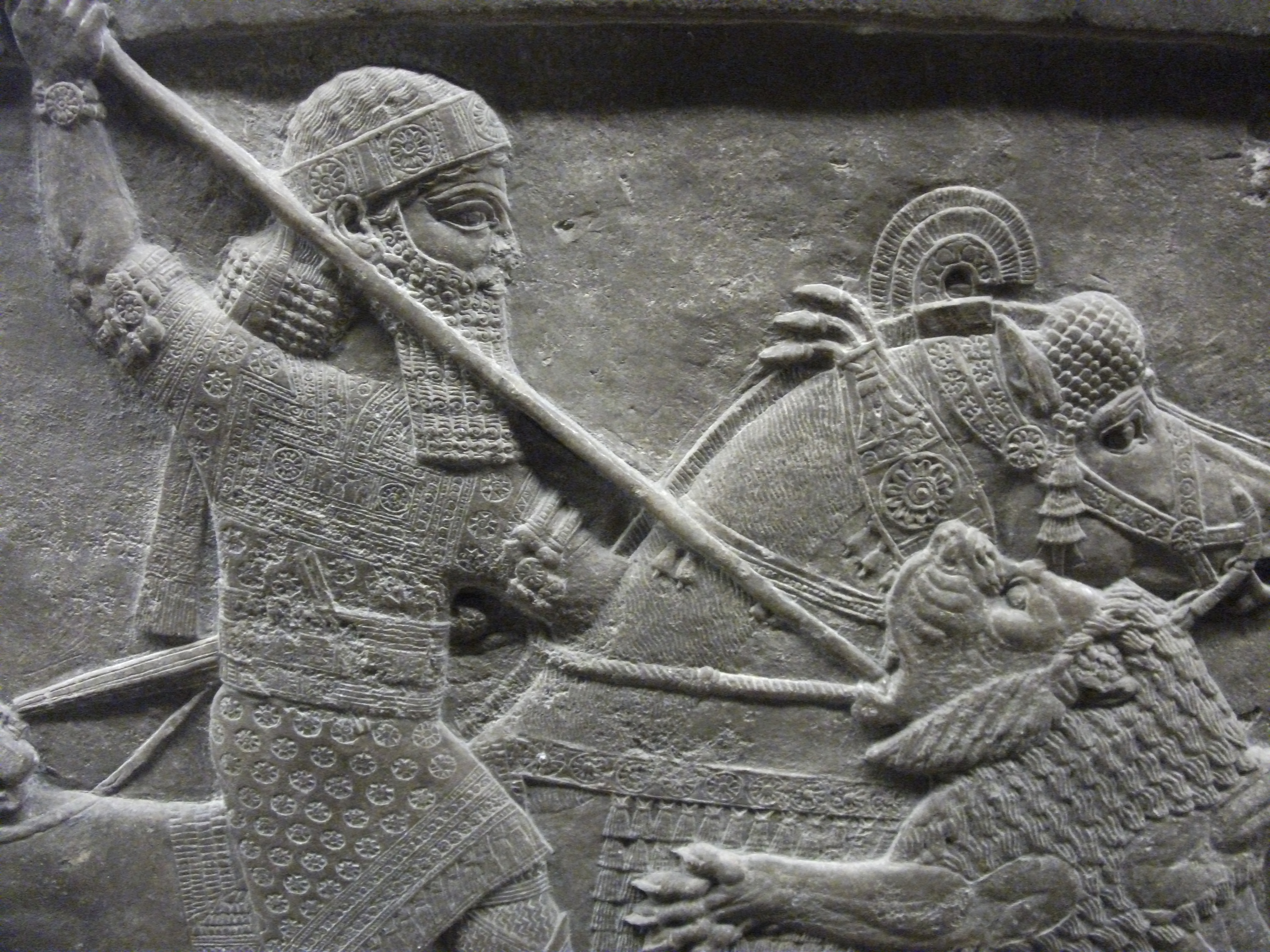
Assyrian relief; King Ashurbanipal spears a lion

==== European Middle Ages ====
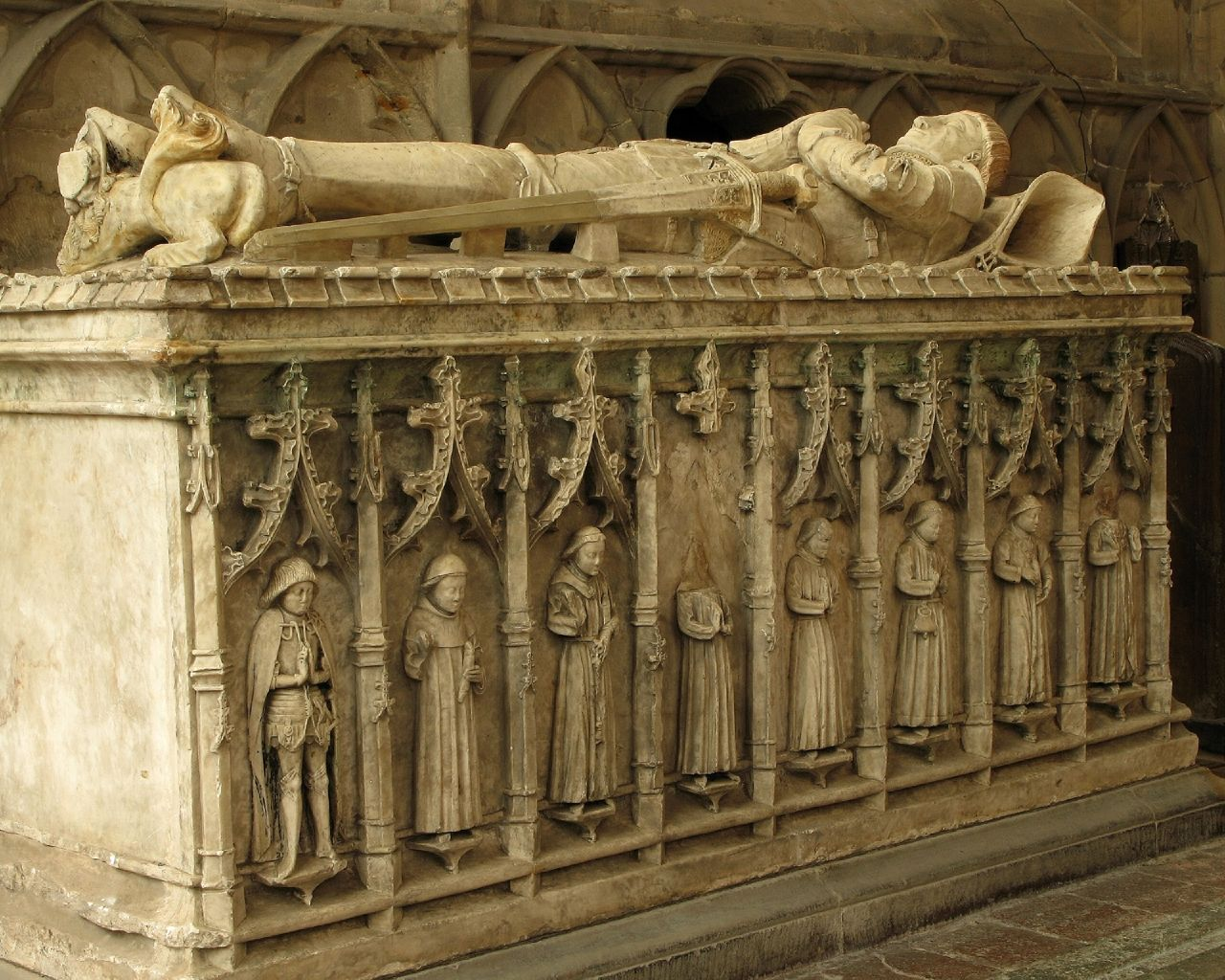
Alabaster sepulchral monument of Nicholas Fitzherbert, d. AD 1473, in St Mary and St Barlock's Church, Norbury, Derbyshire, England

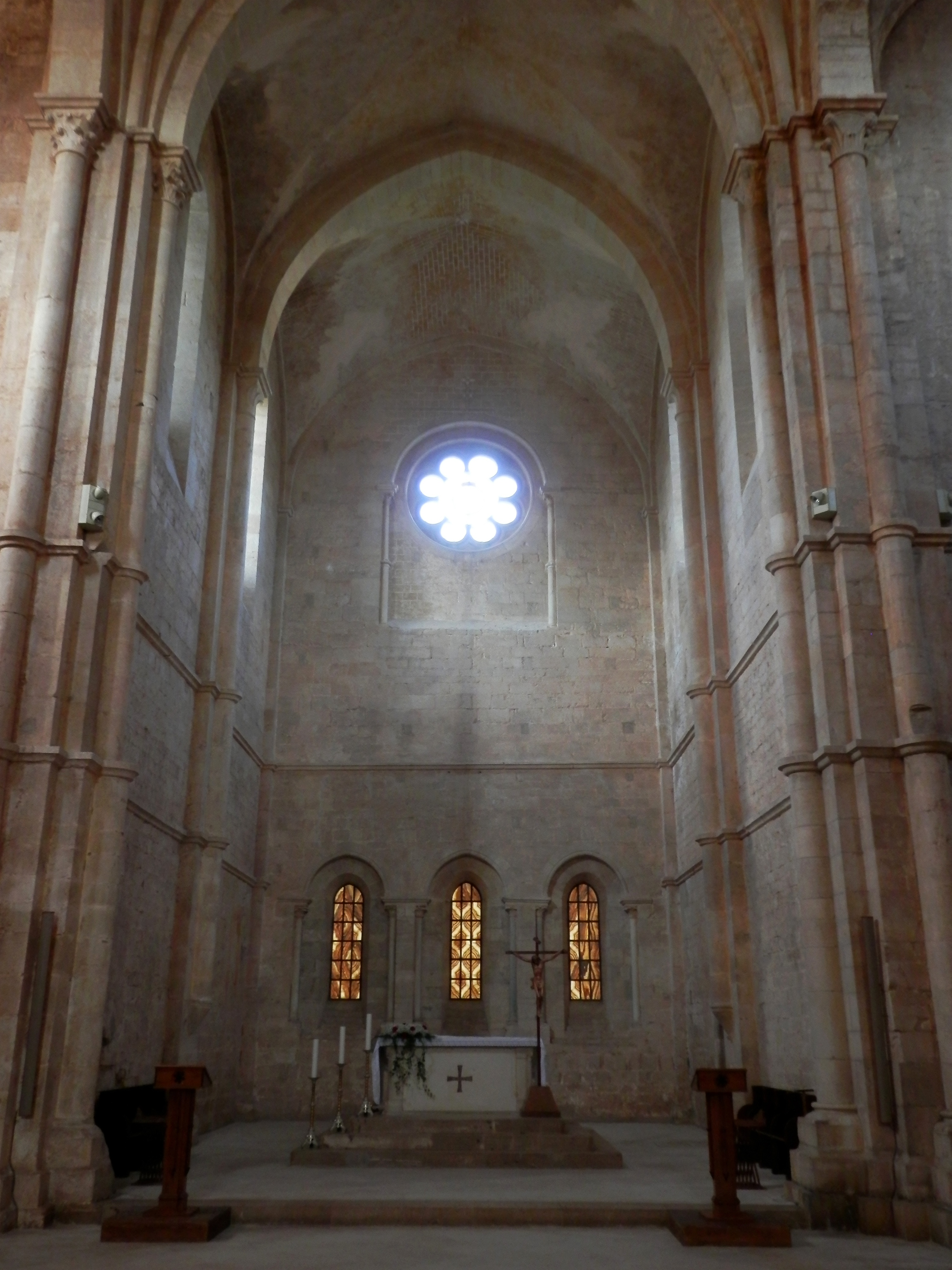
Alabaster windows in the choir of Fossanova Abbey church (12th century) in Latina, Italy

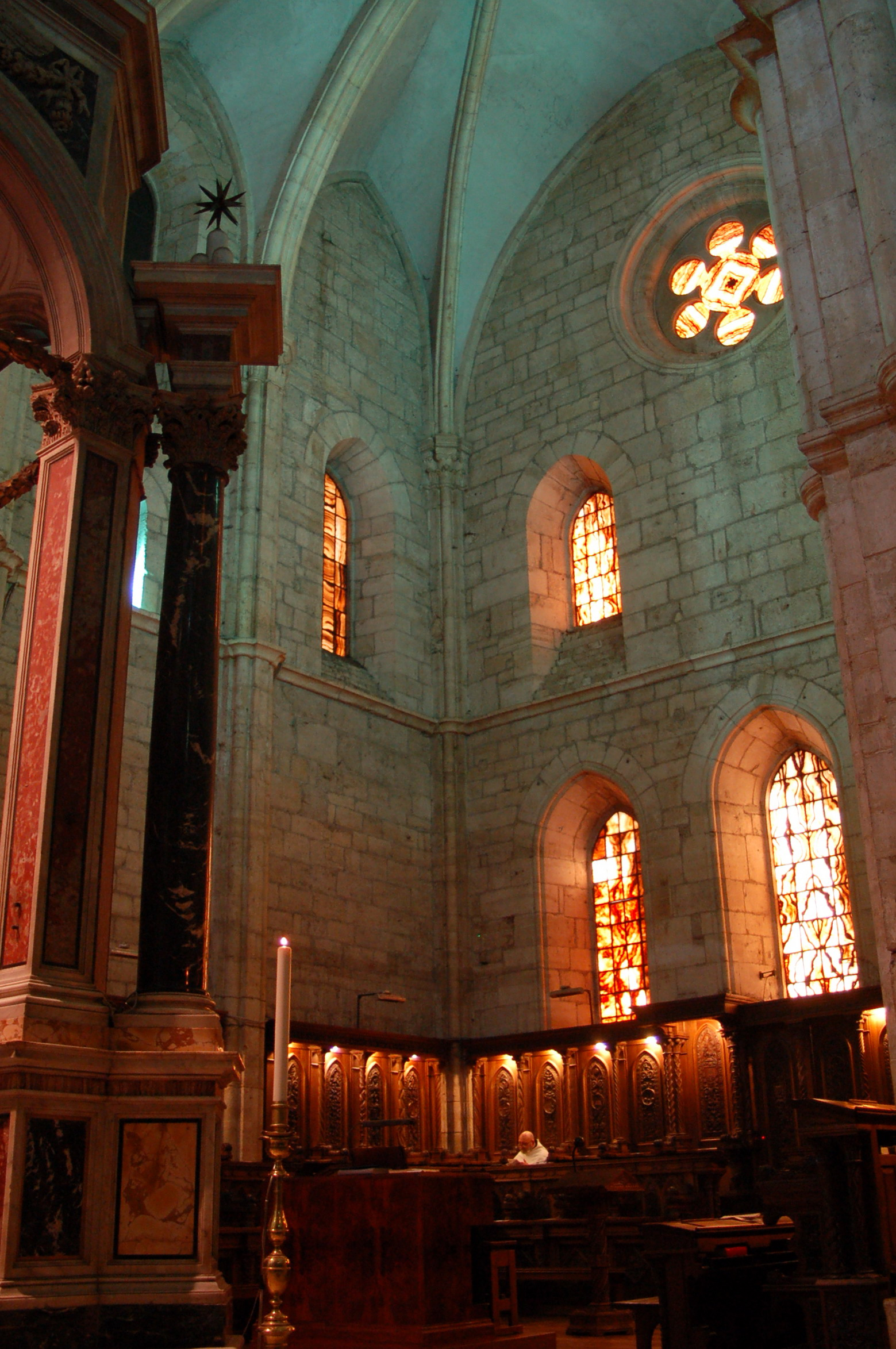
Alabaster windows and rosette in the central apse of Casamari Abbey church (1203–1217) in Lazio, Italy

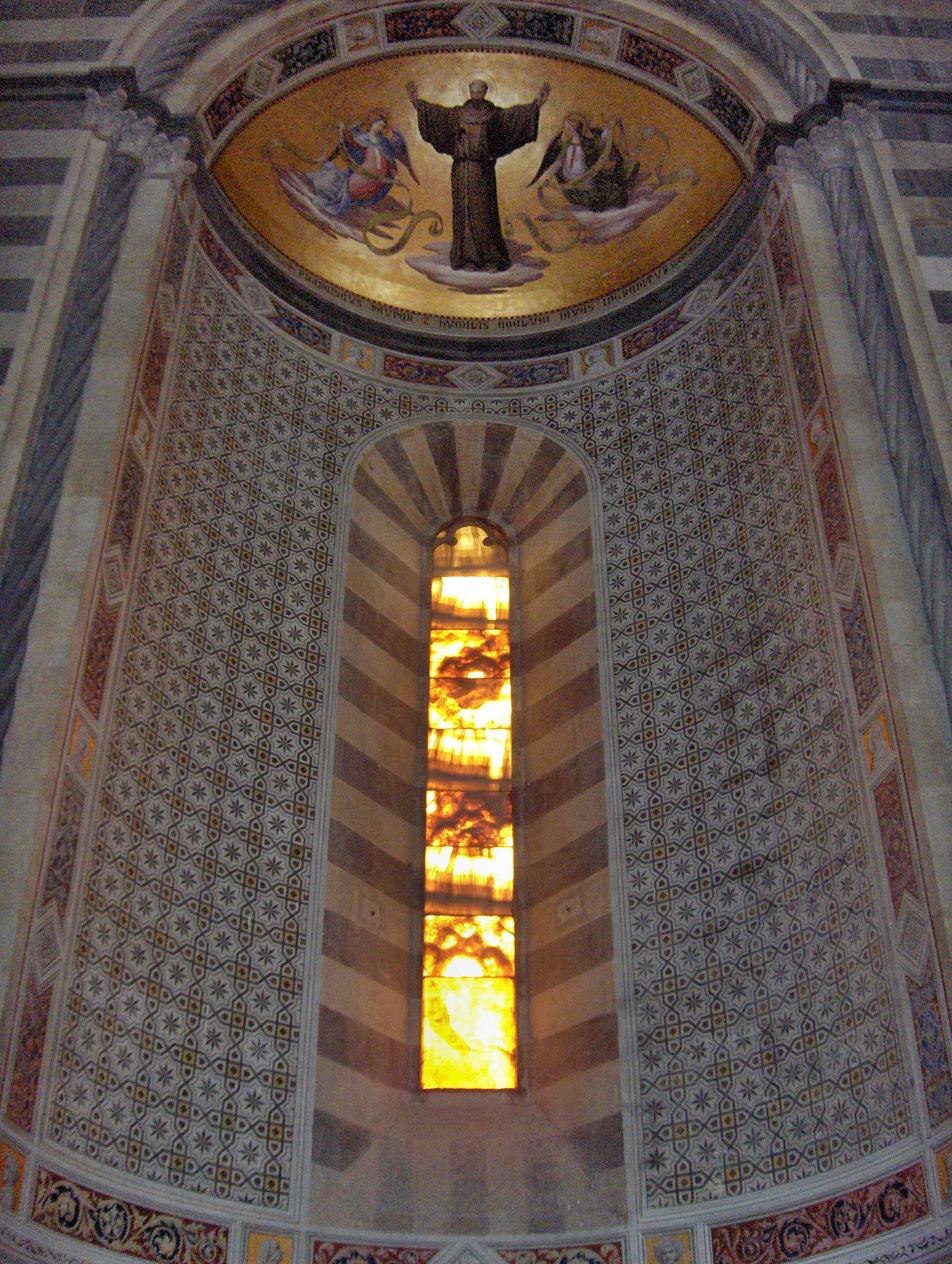
Alabaster window in Orvieto Cathedral (14th century), Italy

==== Modern ====
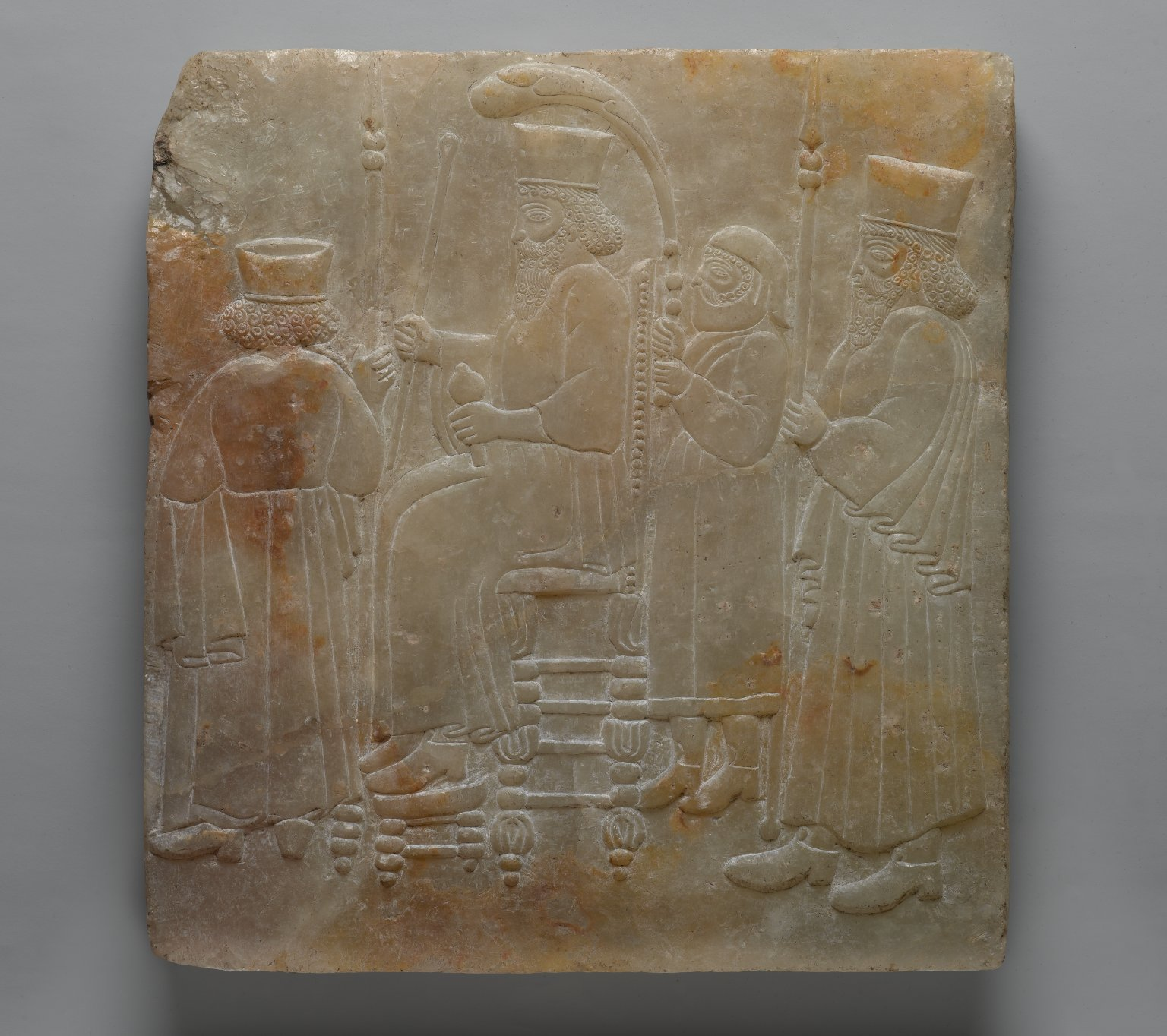
Archaizing Relief of a Seated King and Attendants, Iran, Qajar period (late 19th century CE, in the style of 5th–4th century BC). Brooklyn Museum.

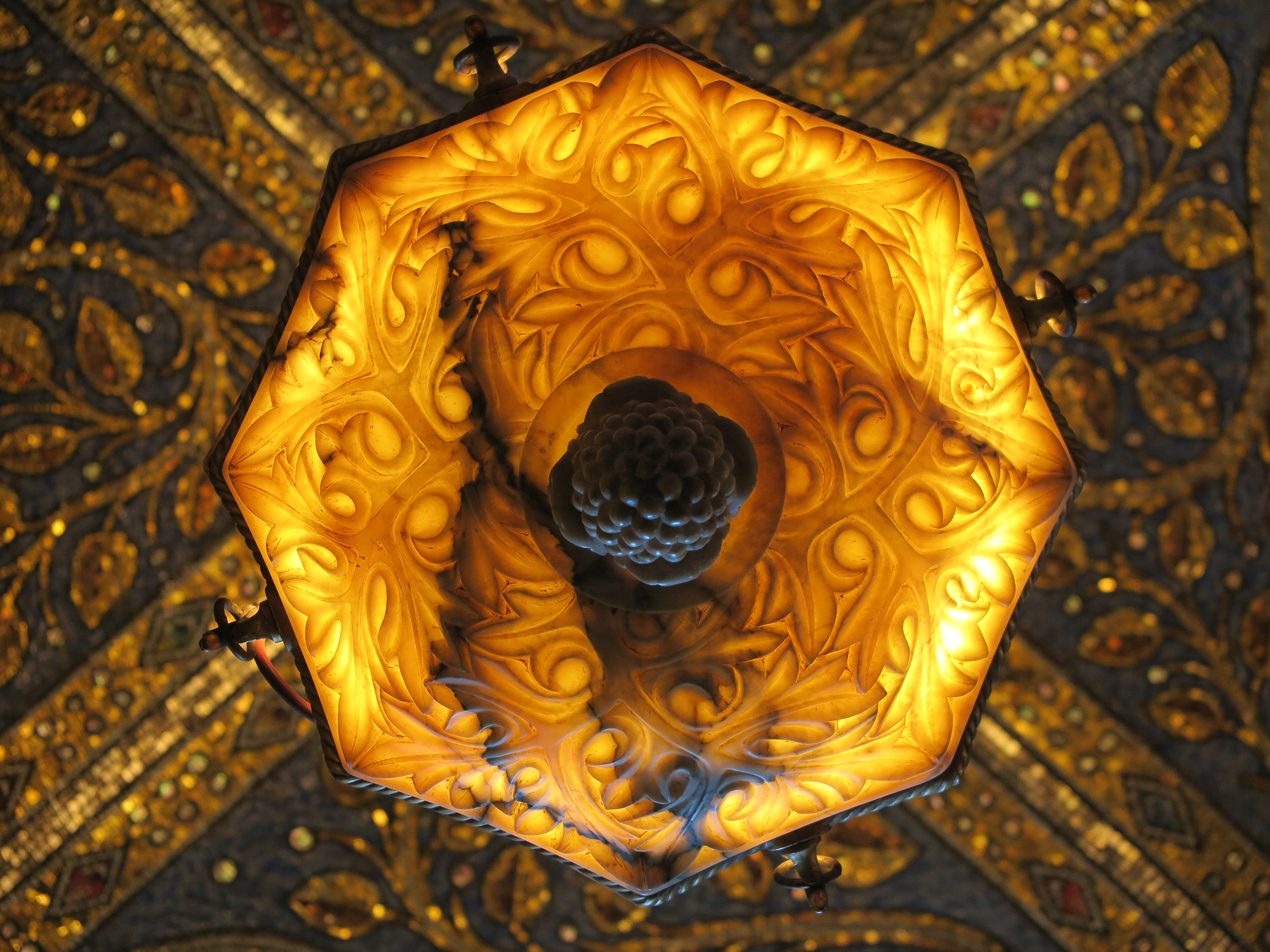
Alabaster lamp, Aachen Cathedral, Germany (early 20th century)

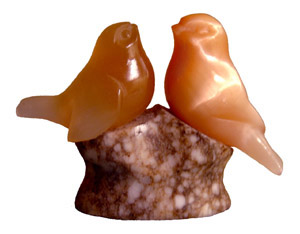
Objet d'art with gypsum alabaster base, showing typical mottling (modern)

== See also ==
=== Mineralogy ===
- Anhydrite – Mineral, anhydrous calcium sulfate – a mineral closely related to gypsum
- Calcium sulfate – Chemical derived from gypsum used in food and industry – the main inorganic compound (CaSO_{4}) of gypsum
- Fengite – Translucent marble or alabaster sheet – translucent sheets of marble or alabaster used during the Early Middle Ages for windows instead of glass
- List of minerals

=== Window and roof panels ===
Chronological list of examples:

- Mausoleum of Galla Placidia – Roman mausoleum – 5th century, Ravenna
- Basilica of San Vitale – Minor basilica in Ravenna, Italy – 6th century, Ravenna
- Valencia Cathedral – Cathedral in Valencia, Spain – mainly 13th–14th century, Valencia, Spain; the lantern of the octagonal crossing tower
- Orvieto Cathedral – Cathedral church in Umbria, Italy – 14th-century, Orvieto, Umbria, central Italy
- St. Peter's Basilica – Roman Catholic basilica and landmark in Vatican City – 17th century, Rome; alabaster window by Bernini (1598–1680) used to create a "spotlight"
- Church of All Nations – Church constructed 1919–1924 in Jerusalem – 1924, Jerusalem, architect: Antonio Barluzzi. Windows fitted with dyed alabaster panels.
- Church of the Transfiguration – Franciscan church on Mount Tabor in Israel – 1924, Mount Tabor, architect: Antonio Barluzzi. Alabaster roofing was attempted.
