= Alabastron =

Small oil-holding pottery or glass vessel

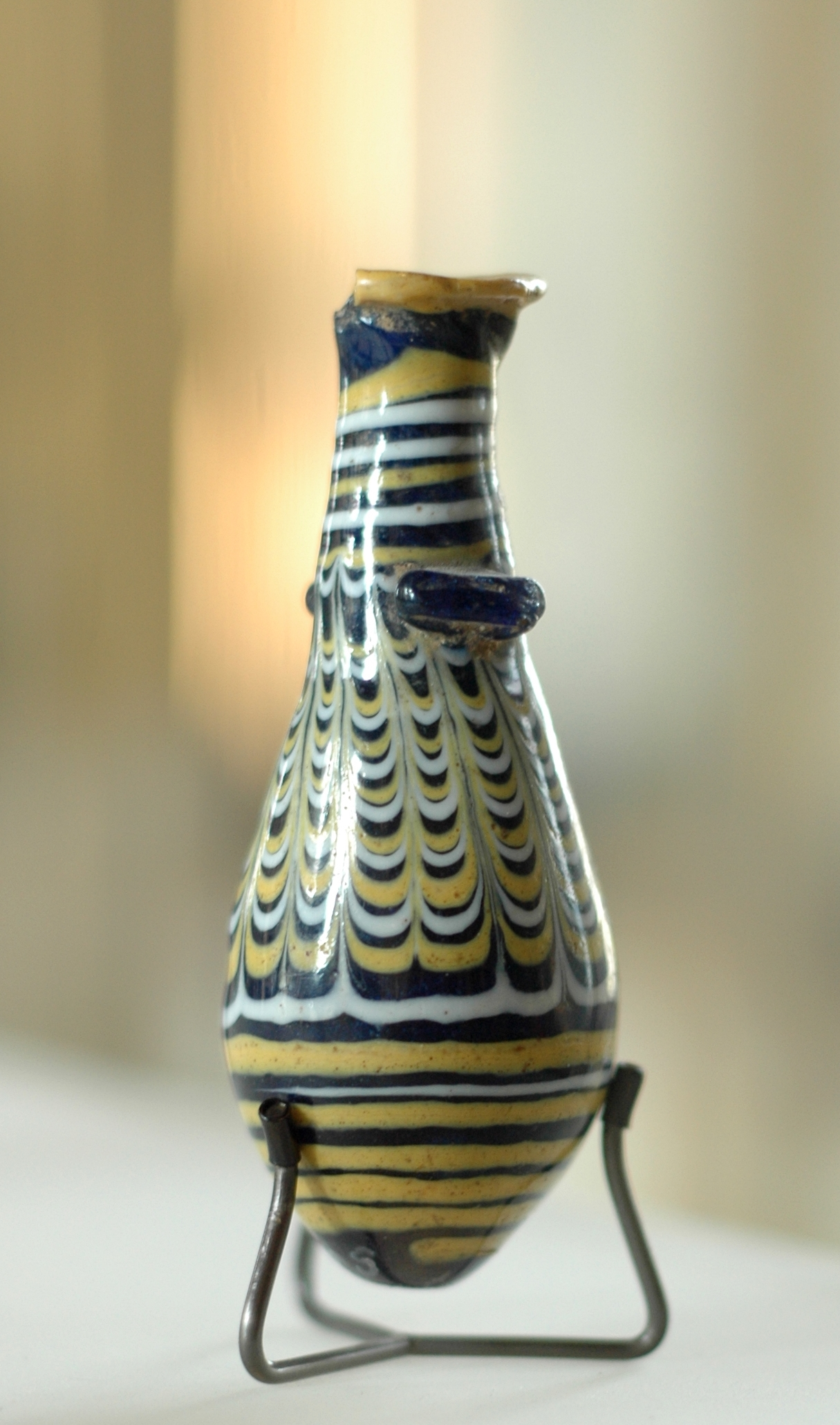
Greek glass alabastron, probably made in Italy in 1st/2nd century BC, and now part of the Campana Collection of the Musée du Louvre.

An alabastron /ˌæləˈbæstrən, -ˌtrɒn/ or alabastrum /ˌæləˈbæstrəm/ (Ancient Greek: ἀλάβαστρον or ἀλάβαστος; plural: alabastra or alabastri (ἀλάβαστρα or ἀλάβαστα)) is a small tapering or pear-shaped vessel, having no feet, used for holding perfumes or massage oils.

== History ==
The first mention of such scent bottles comes from Herodotus, who refers to a myrrh alabastron (μύρου ἀλάβαστρον) as one of the gifts sent by the Persian Emperor Cambyses II to the king of Ethiopia.

Ancient Roman historian Pliny the Elder, while speaking about the origins of precious stones, discusses the Alabastrum stone (alabastrites). According to him, this stone derived from a distinct town Alabastrum, located near Upper Egypt's ancient capital Thebes.

Some scholars believe that this town of Alabastrum (Alabastron) is located near Tell el-Amarna, Egypt. It is known today as Stone Village. There is also the town of Hebenu in this part of Egypt (Minya Governorate) that is also known as Alabastron.

The prototype of the shape of the alabastron container, which includes two lug handles, first appeared in Egypt at the end of the Middle Kingdom (around 1800 BC), and continued into the New Kingdom.

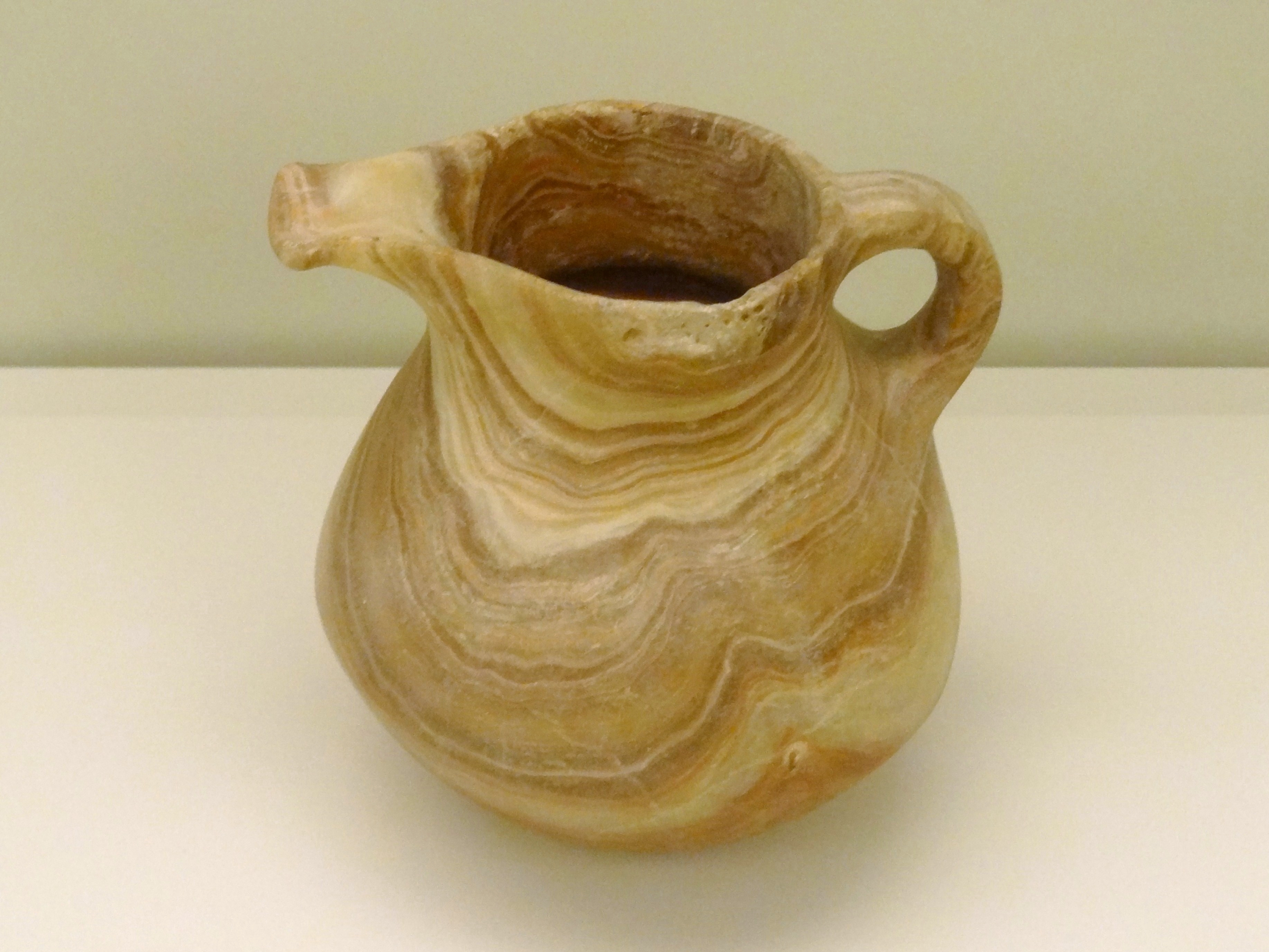
Limestone Alabastron from the island of Mochlos, Greece (Prepalatial, 2500–1800 BC) displays Early Minoan craftsmanship using colorful, banded limestone. Heraklion Archaeological Museum, Crete, Greece

After the end of the Late Bronze Age, Alabastron-shaped containers appeared again in Egypt in the second half of the eighth century, and they became quite common by the 26th Dynasty. At the same time, this type of container is widely attested elsewhere, such as in Assyrian territories, and the Levantine coast. An early glass Alabastron is documented from the reign of Sargon II (722–705). From the seventh century onward, Alabastra are found all across the Mediterranean and ancient Greece.

== Description ==
These containers were originally crafted from alabaster, particularly the onyx-alabaster variety, which was commonly used for this purpose. However, it's uncertain whether the vessels were named after the material or if the material was named after the vessels. They can also be made from stone and terra-cotta, with other materials like glass and even gold (χρύσεια ἀλάβαστρα) being used as well.

Most types of alabastron have a narrow body with a rounded end, a narrow neck and a broad, splayed mouth. They were often left without handles, but some types were equipped with ear-shaped projections or lugs into which holes were punched. Strings were then put through these holes for easy mobility.

Later designs were made from glass decorated with various patterns, such as scallops, festoons, or abstract patterns of rings or zigzags.

=== Distribution ===
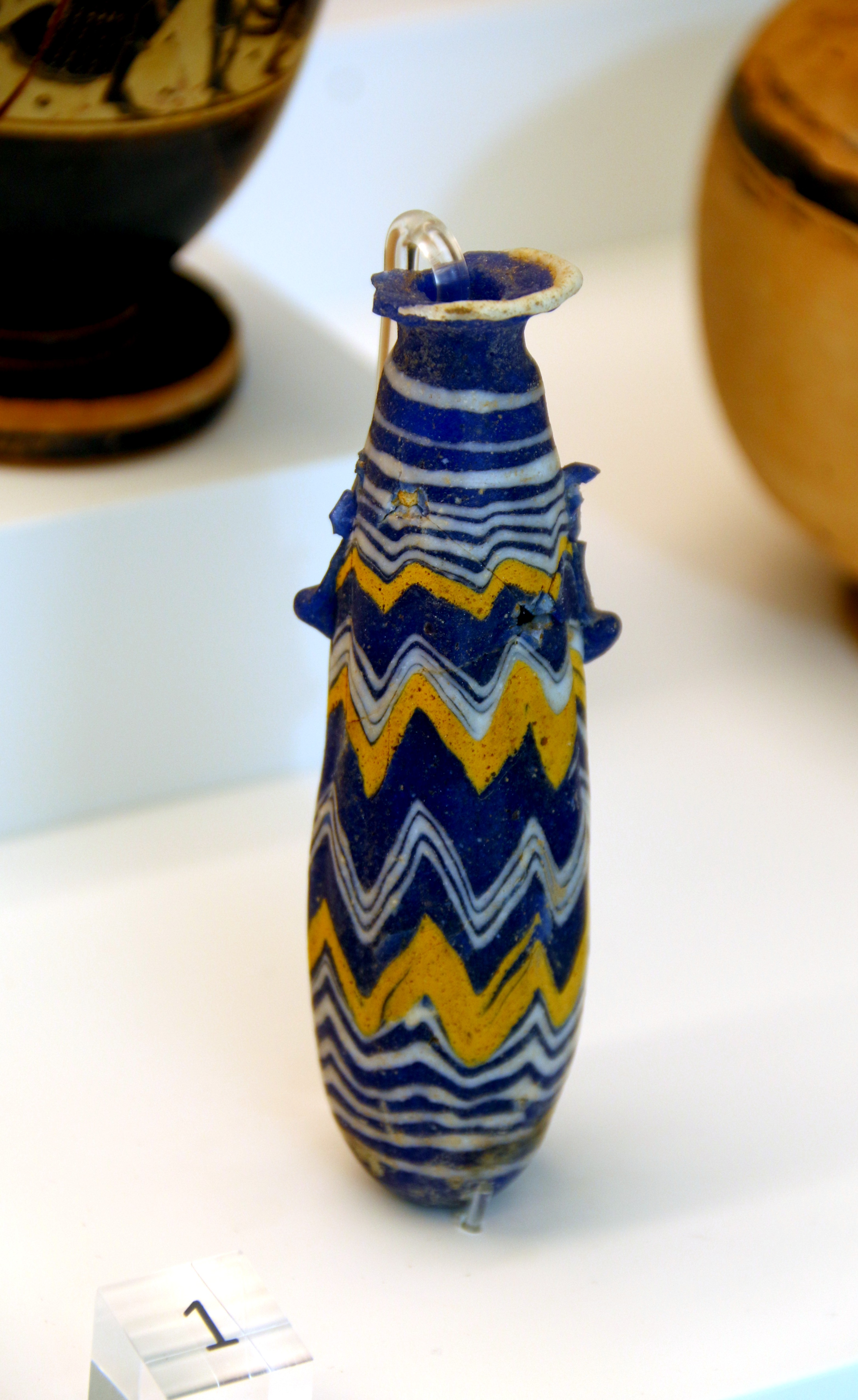
Phoenician alabastron (6th-5th century BC). Reggio Calabria archaeological museum

Around the 7th century BC, alabastra spread to Greece and became an important element of ancient Greek pottery. This spreading influence can be considered as part of the widely seen orientalizing phenomenon during this period. Lydia and Anatolia also played a big part in this type of production.

There were three distinct types of Greek alabastron:

- A basic Corinthian bulbous shape standing about 3–4 inches (76–102 mm) tall; a popular design found throughout Greece.
- A long and pointed version commonly seen in eastern Greek, Etruscan, and Italo-Corinthian pottery.
- An Attic type about 4–8 inches (10–20 cm) long with a rounded base and lugs for carrying purposes.

Alabastra also appeared in many other places in the ancient world, notably Assyria, Syria and Palestine. Alabastra have been traded by Greek and Phoenician merchants as far as Italy and the western Mediterranean.

The production of glass varieties is well documented on the islands of Cyprus and Rhodes, where the Phoenician activities have been widely attested. In Lydia, legendary for its wealth of gold, precious metal Alabastra are known from the sixth century BC.

Greek artisans were producing elaborately decorated silver alabastra, long and narrow and 12–16 centimeters (4.7–6.3 in) in height. The decoration usually involved dividing the body of the vase into four horizontal zones by ornamental bands around it.

An alabastrotheca (ἀλαβαστροθήκη or ἀλαβαστοθήκη) was a box or casket for storing alabastra or a holder used to keep the bottles upright when not in use, as their rounded bottoms made them unable to stand on their own.

== Notable examples ==
The quadrilingual "Caylus Vase of Xerxes" Alabastron with Egyptian hieroglyphs was famously used in the 19th century for deciphering ancient cuneiform scripts. Similar vases, found later, are the Jar of Xerxes I, and also the Yale Babylonian Collection Alabastron Vessel.

== Gallery ==
Ancient Alabastra

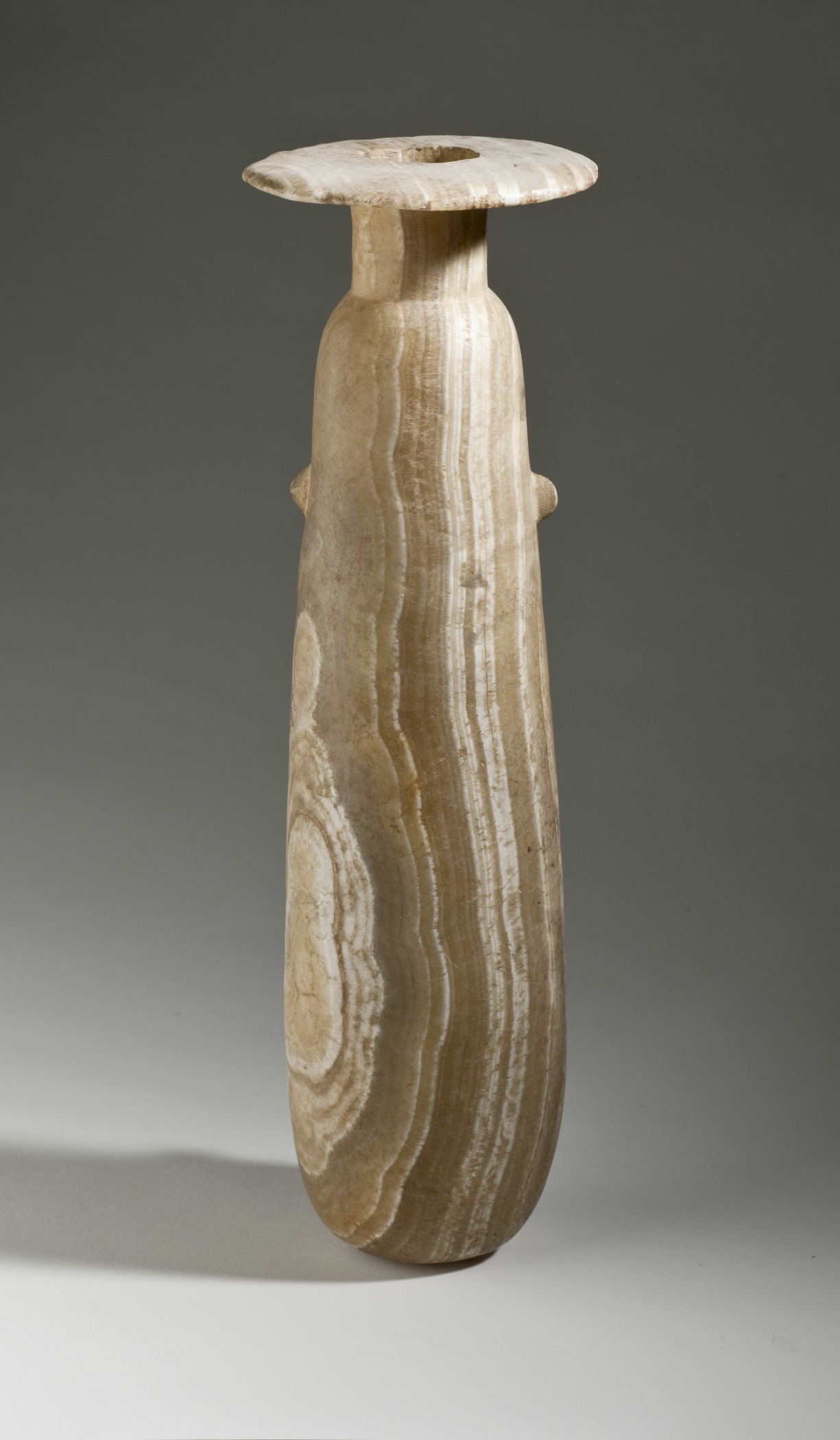
Classic Egyptian stone Alabastron from the 26th Dynasty, 664-525 B.C. LACMA

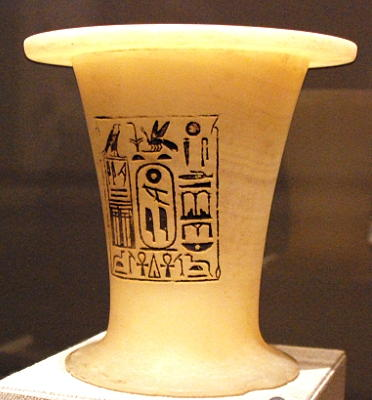
Offering vessel of Pepi I. Walters Art Museum

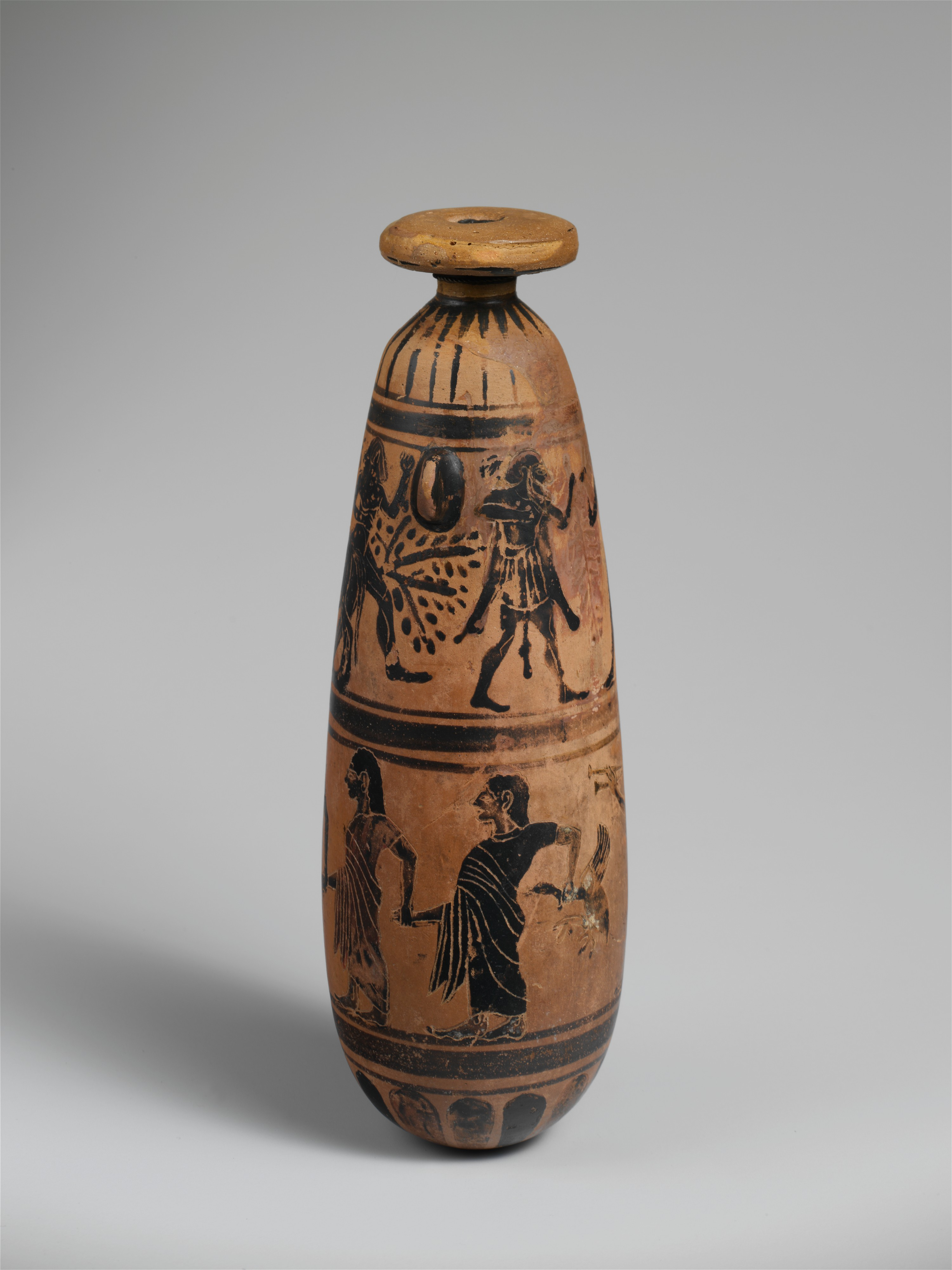
Etruscan terracotta alabastron. Metropolitan Museum

An Ethiopian soldier in the Persian army alabastron, ca. 480 BC. British Museum

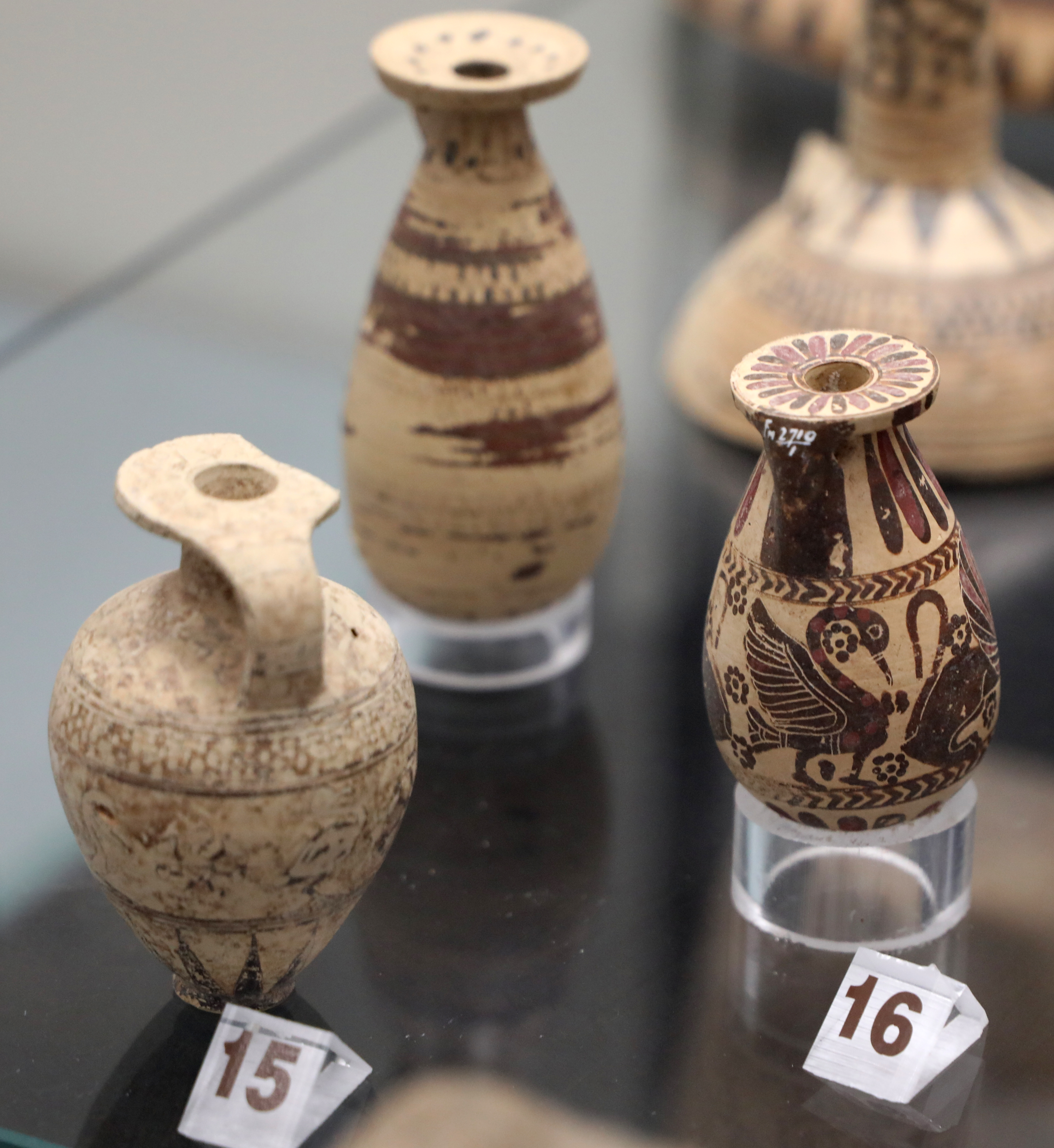
Early Corinthian alabastra from 650-600 BC. Museo archeologico nazionale della Sibaritide

== See also ==
- Caylus vase
- Ancient Greek vase painting
- Pottery of ancient Greece

== Bibliography ==
- "Alabastron." Encyclopædia Britannica. 2006

== External sites ==
- Alabastron. University of Colorado Boulder
- https://kerameikos.org/id/alabastron
