= John Waddy =

John Waddy may refer to:

- John Waddy (actor) (1751–1814), Irish actor and theatrical manager
- John Waddy (British Army officer) (1920–2020), officer in the Parachute Regiment during the Second World War, who later became Colonel SAS
- John Lloyd Waddy (1916–1987), Royal Australian Air Force fighter ace, who later became a Minister of the Crown
