= Le Badie =

- Frazione
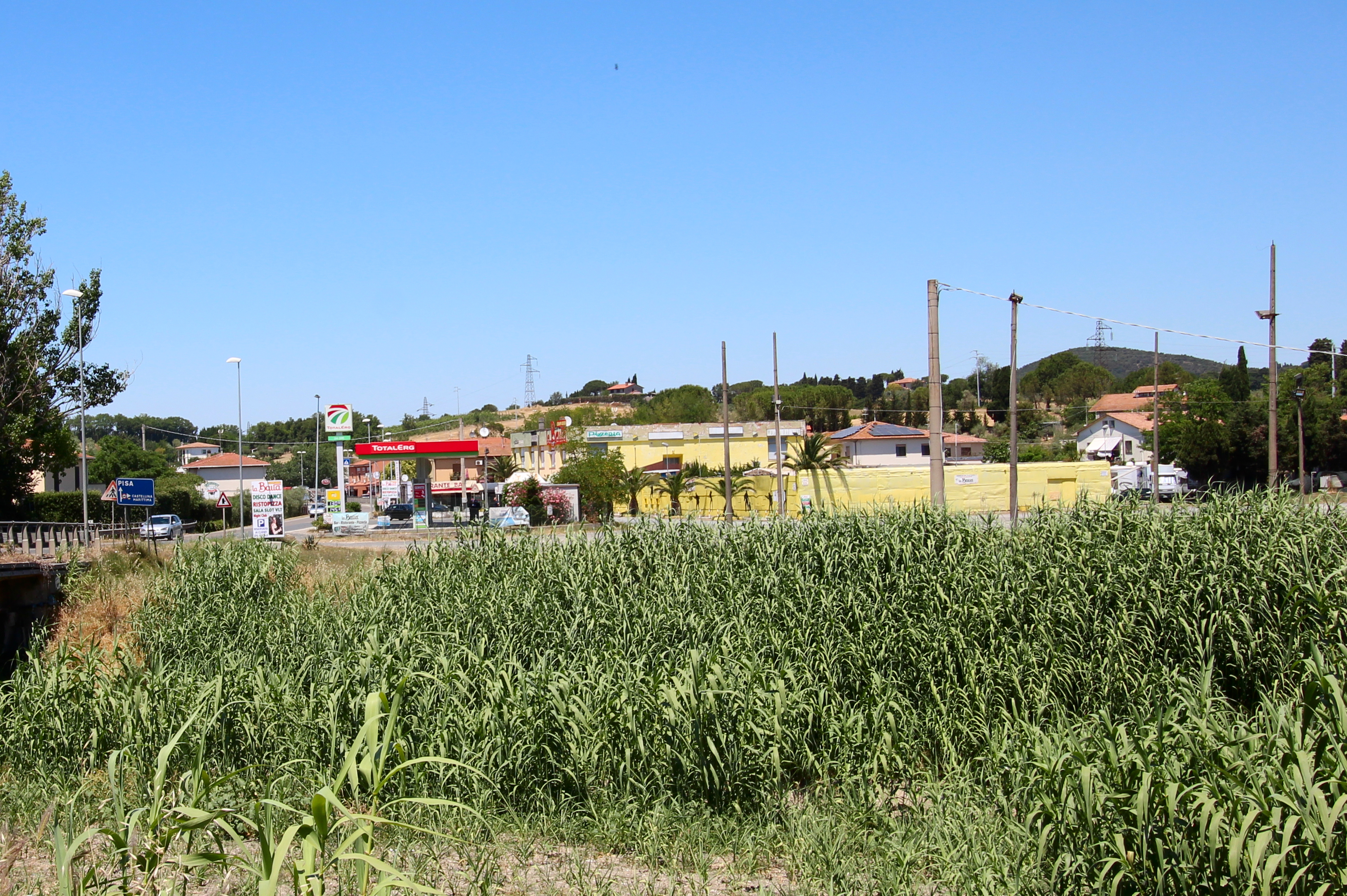

- Location of Le Badie in Italy
- Coordinates: 43°23′56″N 10°29′47″E
- Country: Italy
- Region: Tuscany
- Province: Pisa (PI)
- Comune: Castellina Marittima
- Elevation: 18 m (59 ft)

Population (2011)
  - Total: 144
- Time zone: UTC+1 (CET)
  - Summer (DST): UTC+2 (CEST)
- Postal code: 56040
- Dialing code: (+39) 050

Le Badie is a village in Tuscany, central Italy, administratively a frazione of the comune of Castellina Marittima, province of Pisa. At the time of the 2001 census its population was 167.

Le Badie is about 45 km from Pisa and 8 km from Castellina Marittima.
