= Castellina Marittima =

- Comune
- Comune di Castellina Marittima
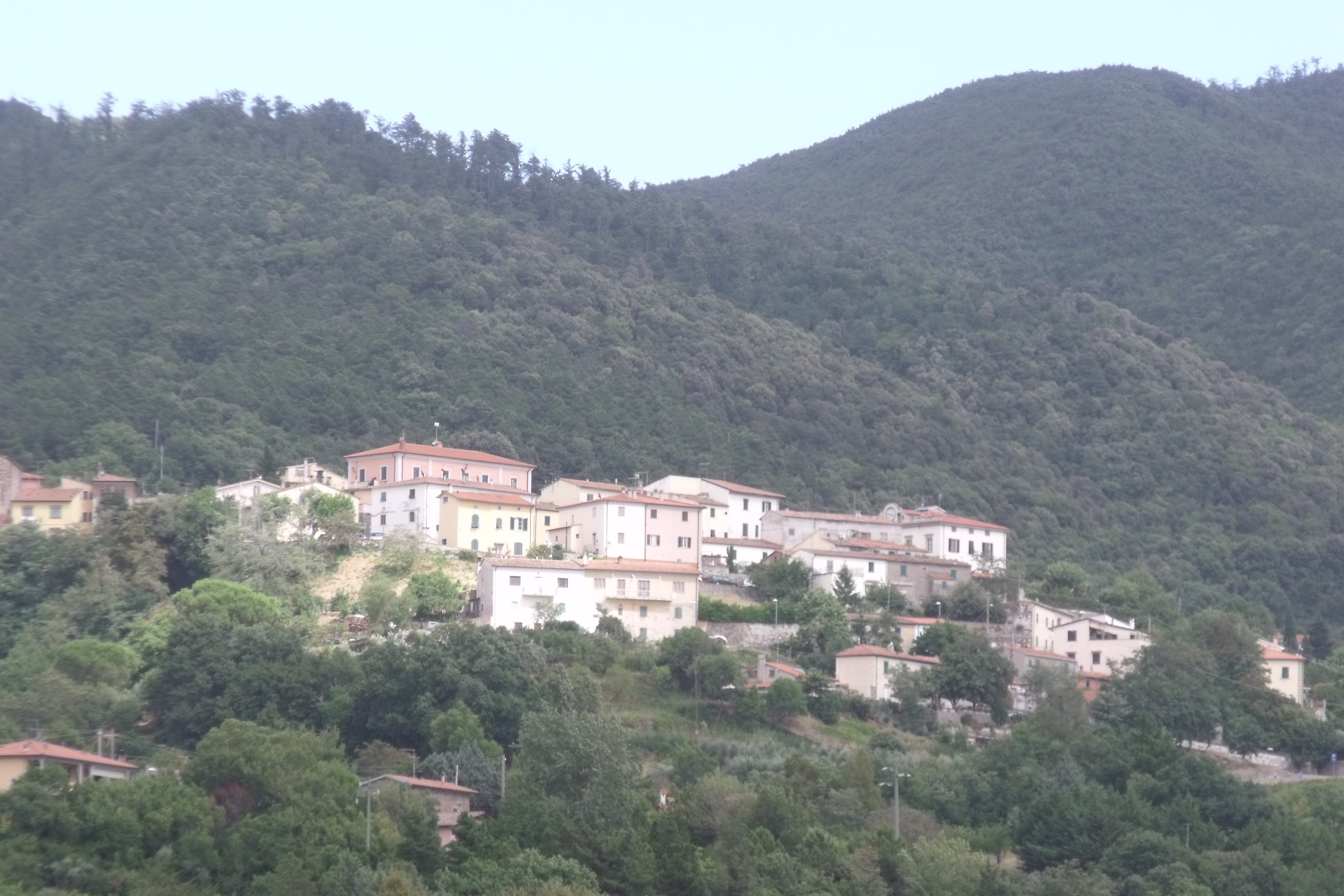
- Panorama of Castellina Marittima

- Coat of arms

- Location within Italy Location within Tuscany
- Coordinates: 43°25′N 10°35′E
- Country: Italy
- Region: Tuscany
- Province: Pisa (PI)
- Frazioni: Le Badie, Malandrone, Terriccio

Government
  - Mayor: Manolo Panicucci

Area
  - Total: 45.52 km^{2} (17.58 sq mi)
- Elevation: 375 m (1,230 ft)

Population (30 June 2017)
  - Total: 1,970
  - Density: 43.3/km^{2} (112/sq mi)
- Demonym: Castellinesi
- Time zone: UTC+1 (CET)
  - Summer (DST): UTC+2 (CEST)
- Postal code: 56040
- Dialing code: 050
- Patron saint: Saint John the Beheaded
- Saint day: August 29
- Website: Official website

Castellina Marittima is a comune (municipality) in the province of Pisa in the Italian region Tuscany, located about 70 km (43 mi) southwest of Florence and about 35 km (22 mi) southeast of Pisa.

== Geography ==
The territory of Castellina Marittima borders the following municipalities: Cecina, Chianni, Riparbella, Rosignano Marittimo, Santa Luce.

For centuries Castellina has been an important source for alabaster.

== Population ==
Historical population

Year	Pop.	±%
1861	1,774	—
1871	2,102	+18.5%
1881	2,347	+11.7%
1901	2,520	+7.4%
1911	2,763	+9.6%

Year	Pop.	±%
1921	2,772	+0.3%
1931	3,132	+13.0%
1936	2,908	−7.2%
1951	2,551	−12.3%
1961	2,157	−15.4%

Year	Pop.	±%
1971	1,864	−13.6%
1981	1,824	−2.1%
1991	1,816	−0.4%
2001	1,817	+0.1%

Source: Data from ISTAT
