= Badi, Iran =

Badi بادي
- Village
- Location within Iran
- Coordinates: 31°57′00″N 49°56′00″E
- Country: Iran
- Province: Khuzestan
- County: Izeh
- Bakhsh: Susan
- Rural District: Susan-e Gharbi

Population (2006)
  - Total: 29
- Time zone: UTC+3:30 (IRST)
  - Summer (DST): UTC+4:30 (IRDT)

Badi (Persian: بادي, also Romanized as Bādī) is a village in Susan-e Gharbi Rural District, Susan District, Izeh County, Khuzestan Province, Iran. At the 2006 census, its population was 29, in 4 families.
