= Wadi' =

- Gender: male
- Language(s): Arabic

Wadīʻ (Arabic: وديع, romanized: Wadīʿ [waˈdiːʕ], also anglicized as Wadie, Wadih or Wadia), is a masculine given name meaning 'meek'.

== Given name ==
- Wadie P. Deddeh, American politician
- Wadih el-Hage
- Wadih El Safi, Lebanese singer
- Wadih Gosn, Lebanese judoka
- Wadie Haddad
- Wadie Jwaideh, Iraqi American professor
- Wadih Saadeh
- Wadia Sabra, Lebanese composer

== Patronymic ==
- Nouhad Wadie Haddad, Lebanese singer
- Edward Wadie Said, Palestinian American academic
