= List of Iranian artifacts abroad =

List of Iranian artifacts abroad is a list of notable Iranian and Persian antiquities outside Iran, especially in museums. Most of these were found outside modern Iran, either in parts of the former Persian Empire, or places influenced by it.

== West and Central Asia ==
=== Afghanistan ===
Tillya Tepe, commonly referred to as the Bactrian Gold, is a significant archaeological discovery consisting of approximately 20,600 ornaments, coins, and artifacts crafted from gold, silver, ivory, and other materials. These items were unearthed from six richly adorned burial mounds (five female and one male) dated to the 1st century BCE–1st century CE. The collection includes necklaces inlaid with semi-precious stones, intricately designed belts, medallions, and a crown. The site of Yemshi Tepe, a fortified settlement located about 5 km northeast of modern Sheberghan near Akcha, lies just 500 meters from the Tillia Tepe necropolis. The treasure vanished during Afghanistan's conflicts but reemerged in public view in 2003.

The Buddhas of Bamiyan, along with other Afghan antiquities, suffered significant loss during decades of conflict. However, 33 Buddhist and Hindu artifacts, part of a larger cache of 2,500 items, were recently returned to Afghanistan. These pieces had been seized in U.S. raids between 2012 and 2014 from disgraced Manhattan art dealer Subhash Kapoor, who is currently imprisoned in India on charges of smuggling and theft.

=== Gallery of Tillya Tepe artifacts ===
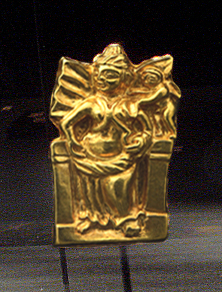
Aphrodite and Eros. Tomb II, Tillia tepe.

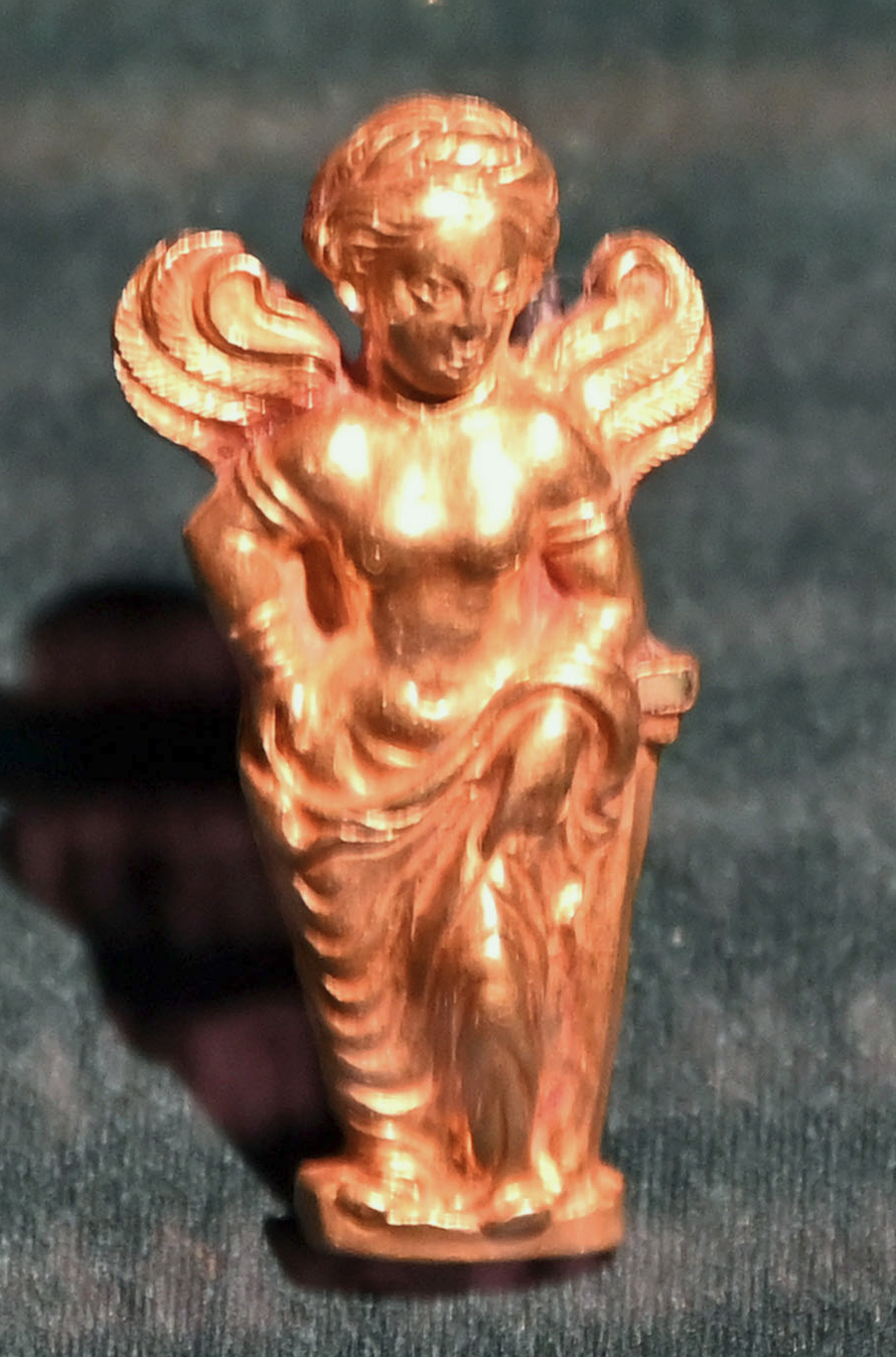
Statuette of winged figurine

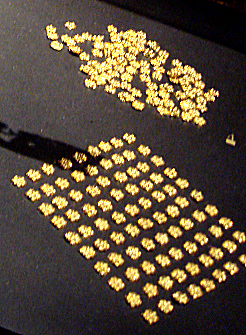
Cloth decorations.

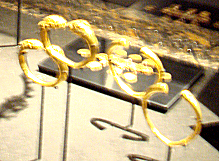
Bracelets.

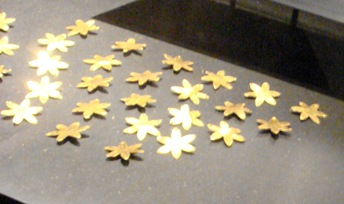
Decorative stars. Tomb I.

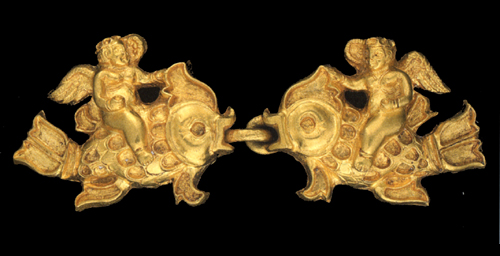
Amorini riding on fish, Tillia tepe. Tomb II.

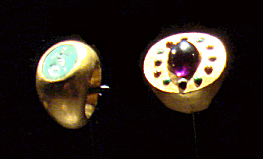
Rings from Tillia tepe; the left one represents a seated Athena. Tomb II.

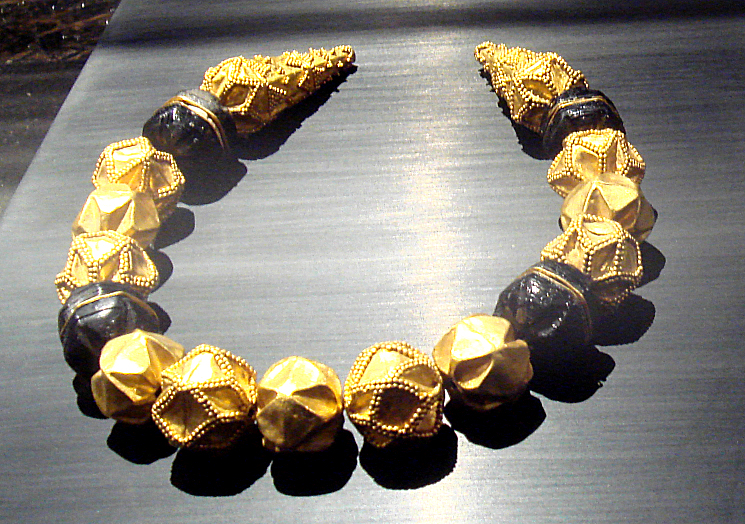
Necklace. Tomb II.

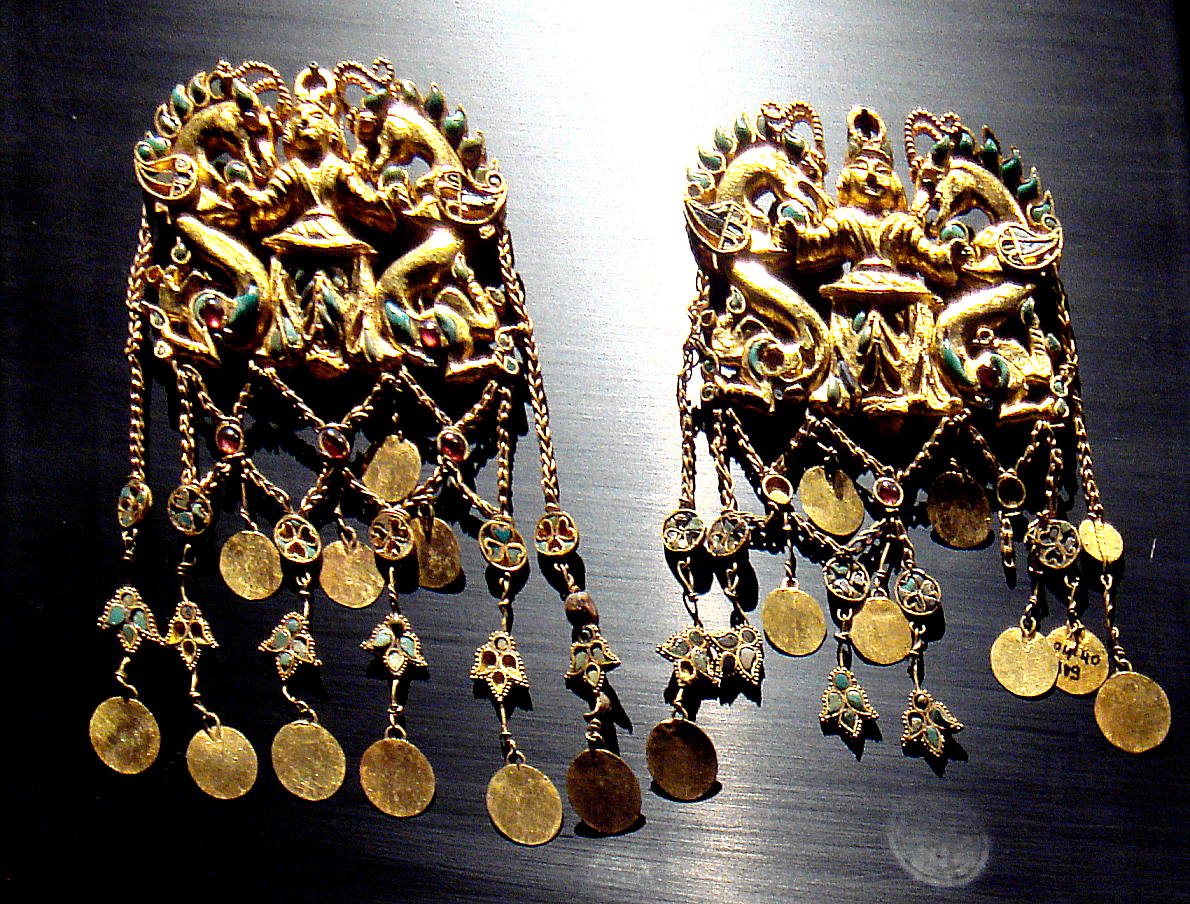
"Kings with dragons". Tomb II.

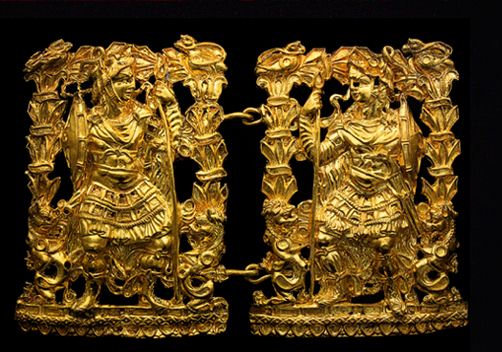
Men in armor, in Greek fighting gear. Tomb III.

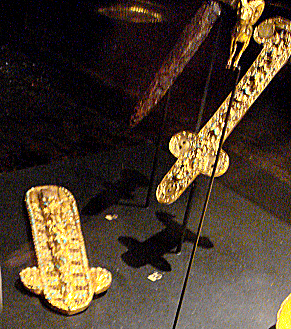
"Akinakes" polylobed decorated daggers. Tomb IV.

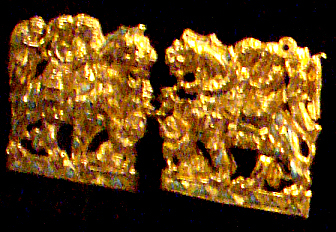
Dyonisos and Ariadne riding a lion. Tomb VI.

Xerxes Cuneiform Van

=== Anatolia (Turkey) ===
The Xerxes I inscription at Van is a trilingual cuneiform inscription of Xerxes the Great (r. 486–465 BCE). Located on the southern slope of a mountain near the Van Fortress by Lake Van in modern-day Turkey, it lay within the Achaemenid province of Armenia during Xerxes’ reign. The inscription, carved approximately 20 metres (70 feet) above ground on a smoothed rock face, was begun by Darius I of Persia (r. 522–486 BCE), who left it blank.

A Persian city unearthed at Oluz Höyük in Amasya also revealed a trove of artifacts during excavations, where the archaeologists uncovered the column bases of a 2,500-year-old palace from the Achaemenid era. The site contains phases A and B, representing architectural evolution. The site's director of excavations, Dr. Şevket Dönmez of Istanbul University stated: ““For the first time this year, a colonnaded reception hall called 'Apadana', a throne hall, and an executive hall began to come to light. We are just at the beginning of the excavations. But even the current findings are very exciting.” He emphasized the importance of this discovery for Anatolian Iron Age, ancient Persian studies, and religious history.

== Europe and the United States ==
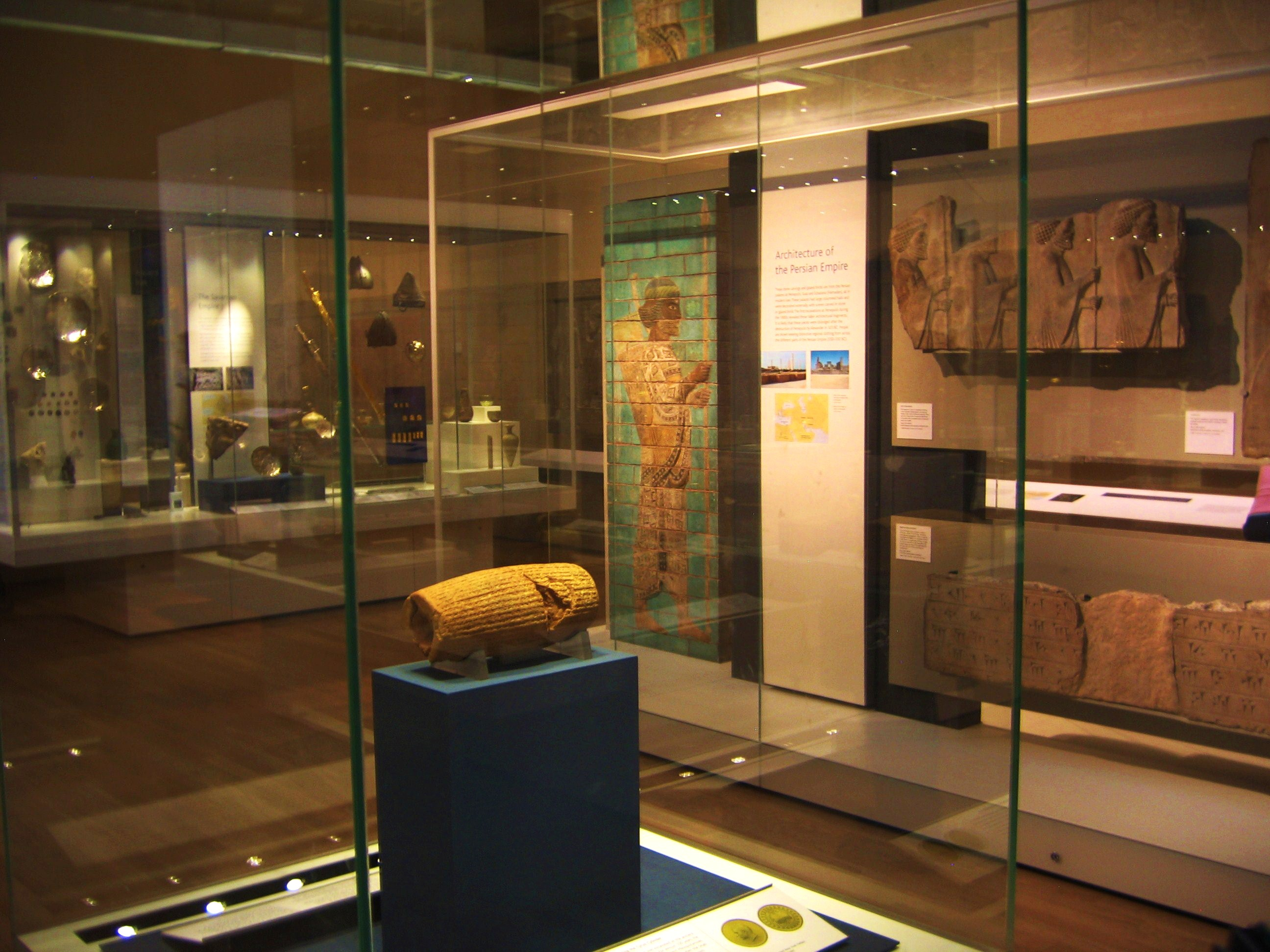
The Cyrus Cylinder in Room 52 of the British Museum in London

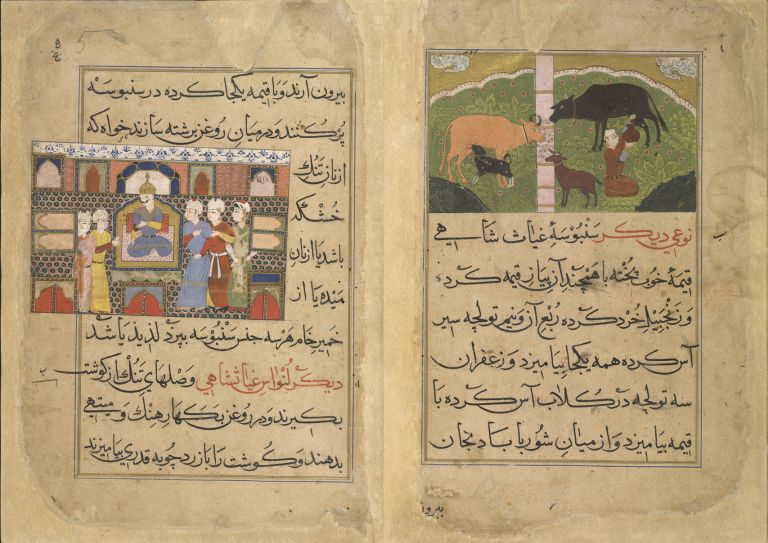
Persian manuscript Nimatnama-i-Nasiruddin-Shahi explaining the preparation of samosas

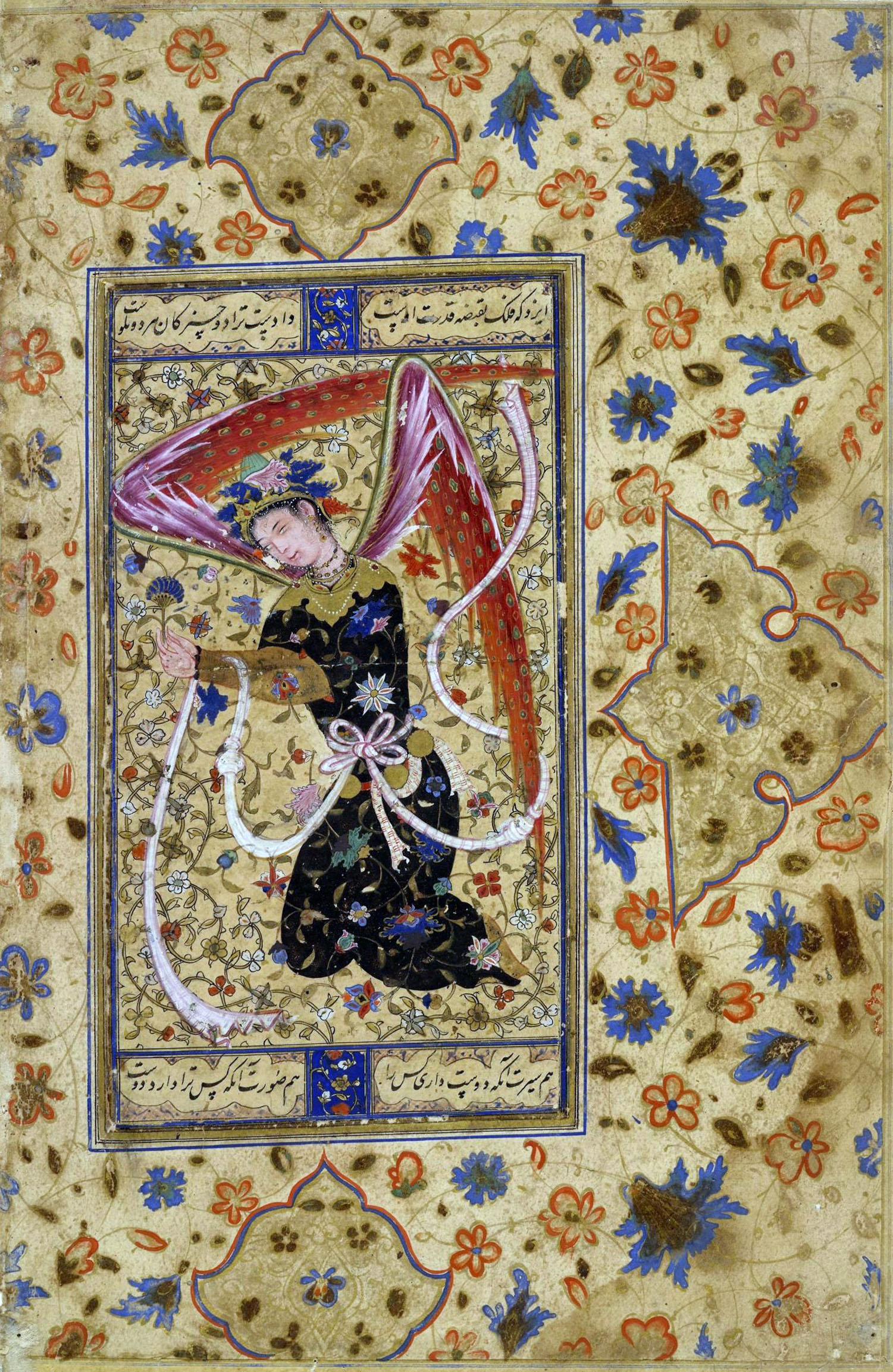
Persian angel, 1555

The Metropolitan Museum of Art features a range of Persian antiquities, including ceramics, engraved coins, and pottery dating back over 3,500 years. Many pieces were originally part of the University of Chicago’s Oriental Institute.

The Cyrus Cylinder, an ancient clay artifact inscribed in Akkadian cuneiform script, was commissioned by Cyrus the Great following his conquest of Babylon in 539 BCE. Discovered in 1879 at Babylon (modern-day Iraq), it is housed in the British Museum, which also funded its discovery.

The Louvre Museum's Department of Near Eastern Antiquities, founded in 1881, exhibits artifacts from Mesopotamia, the Levant, and Persia, including pieces from Sumer, Akkad, and Mari. Notable items include the Stele of the Vultures, Statue of Ebih-Il, and the famed Code of Hammurabi. The Persian section features the "Funerary Head" and Archers of Darius I, as well as objects on loan from Persepolis.

The Oxus treasure (Persian: گنجینه آمودریا) is a remarkable collection of about 180 gold and silver objects from the Achaemenid period, along with roughly 200 coins. Discovered near the Oxus River (likely close to Kobadiyan, Tajikistan) between 1877 and 1880, the treasure is believed to have been associated with a temple where votive offerings accumulated over centuries. The artifacts are typically dated to the 6th–4th centuries BCE, while some coins span later periods.

Most surviving objects are held in the British Museum (Room 52), with some items also housed in the Victoria and Albert Museum and the Hermitage Museum in Saint Petersburg.

=== Georgia ===
The structure known as the Atashgah, meaning "place of fire," in Tbilisi traces its origins to the 5th or 6th century AD during the rule of the Sasanian Empire, when Georgia was under Persian control. It is believed to have functioned as a Zoroastrian fire temple before later conversions. Additionally, a trove of Persian manuscripts is preserved at the Dagestan Scientific Centre.

== Japan ==
The Miho Museum, which holds over 2,000 artifacts in its permanent collection includes many Achaemenid and Central Asian pieces. Some scholars argue several of these objects in its collection may be part of the lost Oxus Treasure, resurfacing in 1993 in Afghanistan, though this theory remains debated.

The Tokyo National Museum also preserves a wide range of Iranian artifacts, including pottery, paintings, calligraphy, metalwork, sculpture, and textiles.

== Gallery ==
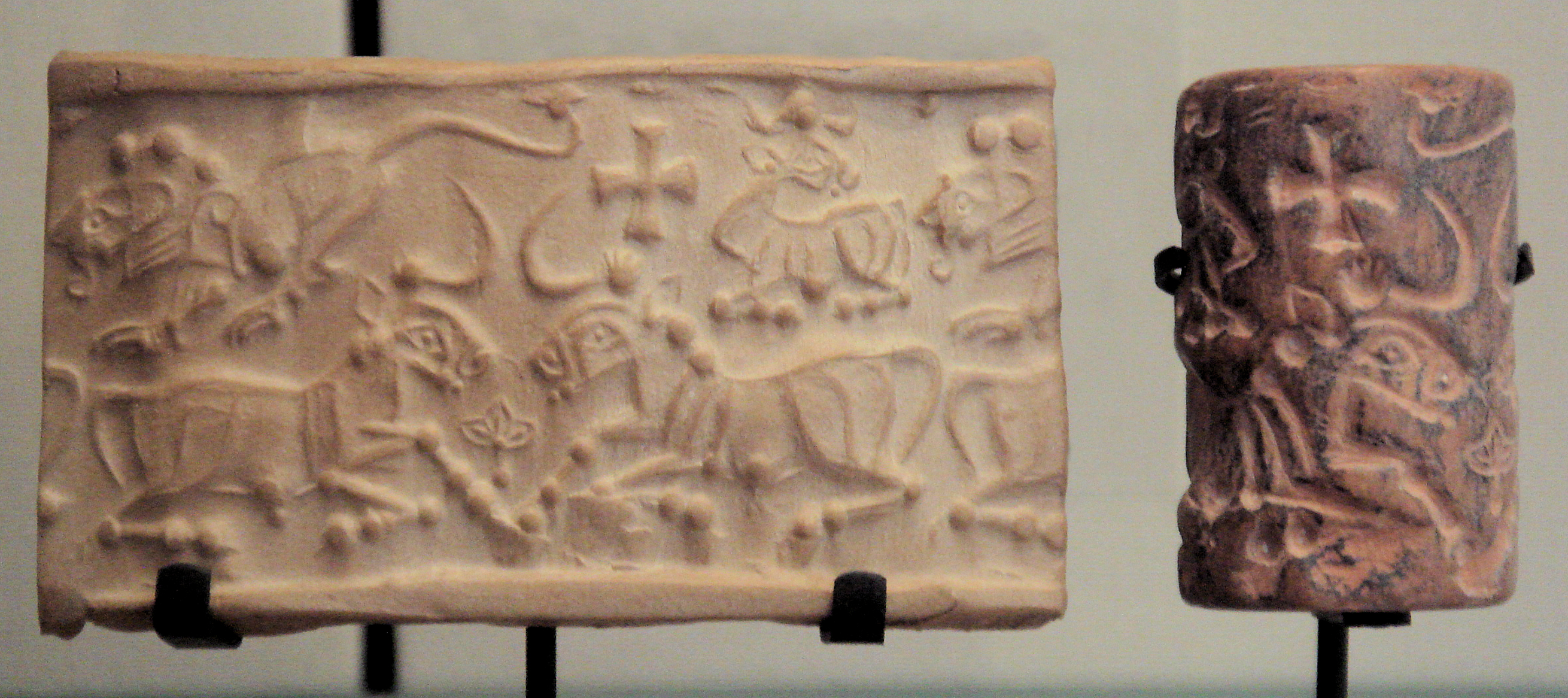
Proto-Elamite cylinder seal (Louvre Museum)

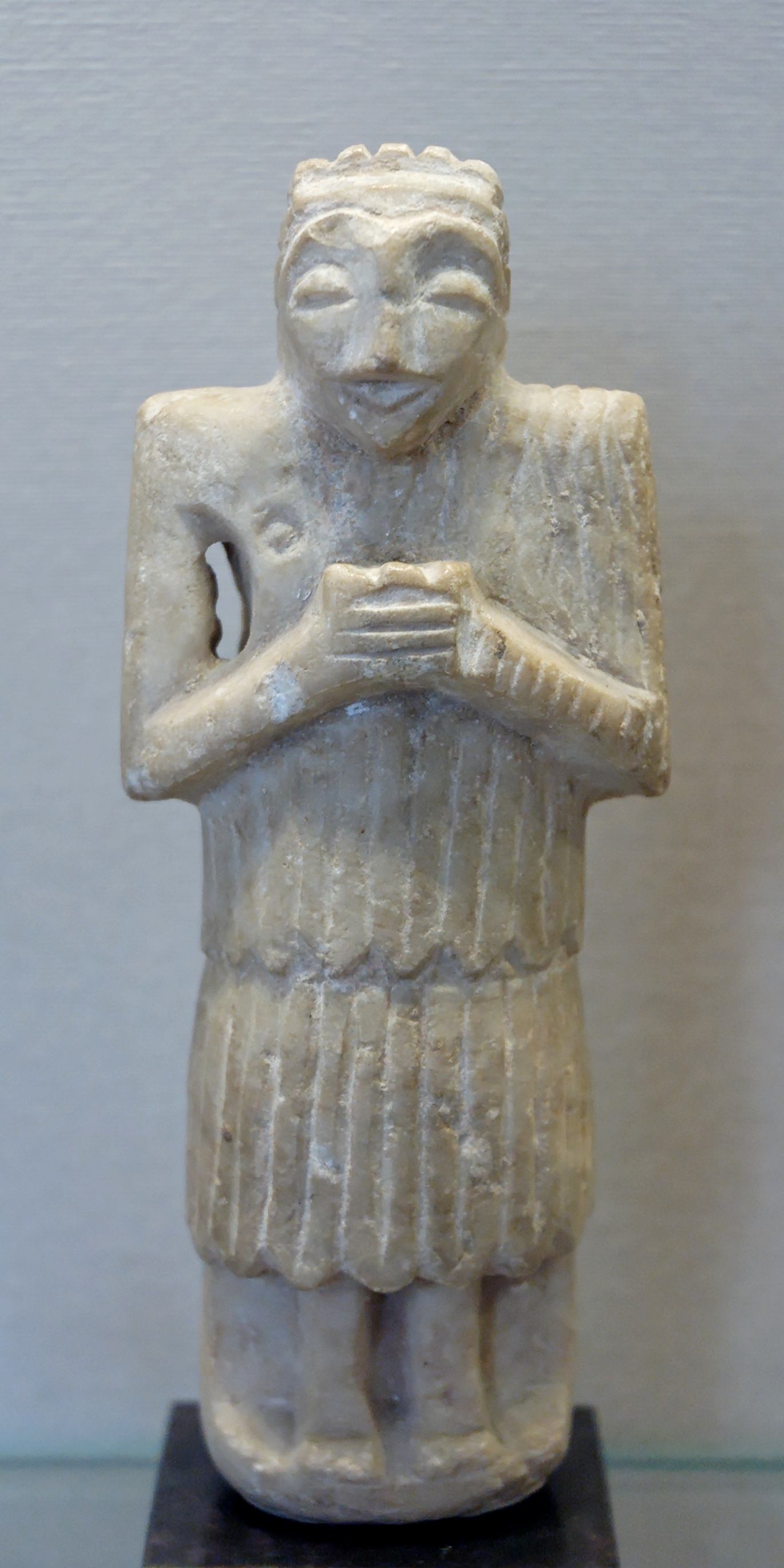
Orant figure of Susa IV (Louvre Museum)

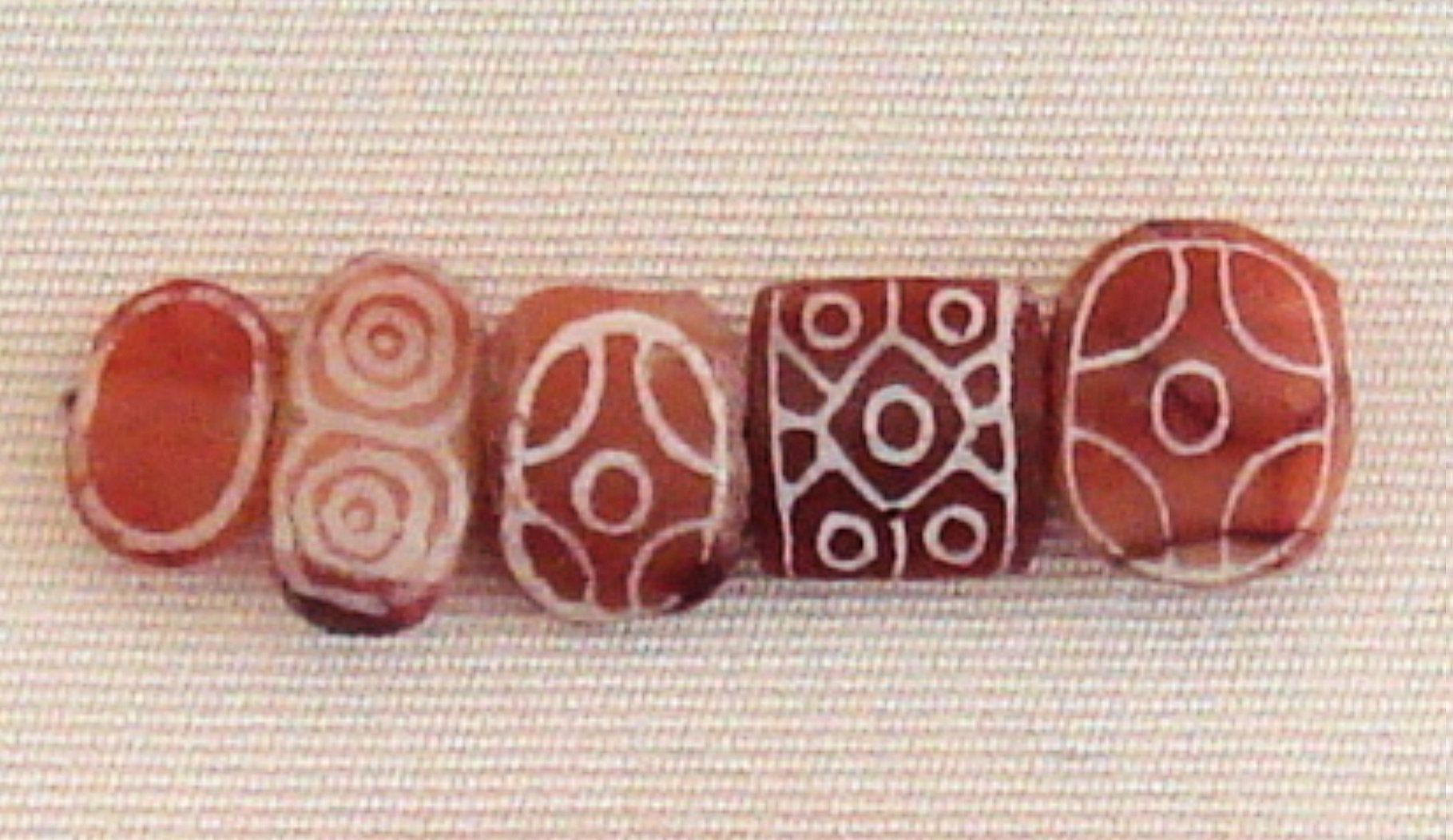
Carnelian beads (Louvre Museum)

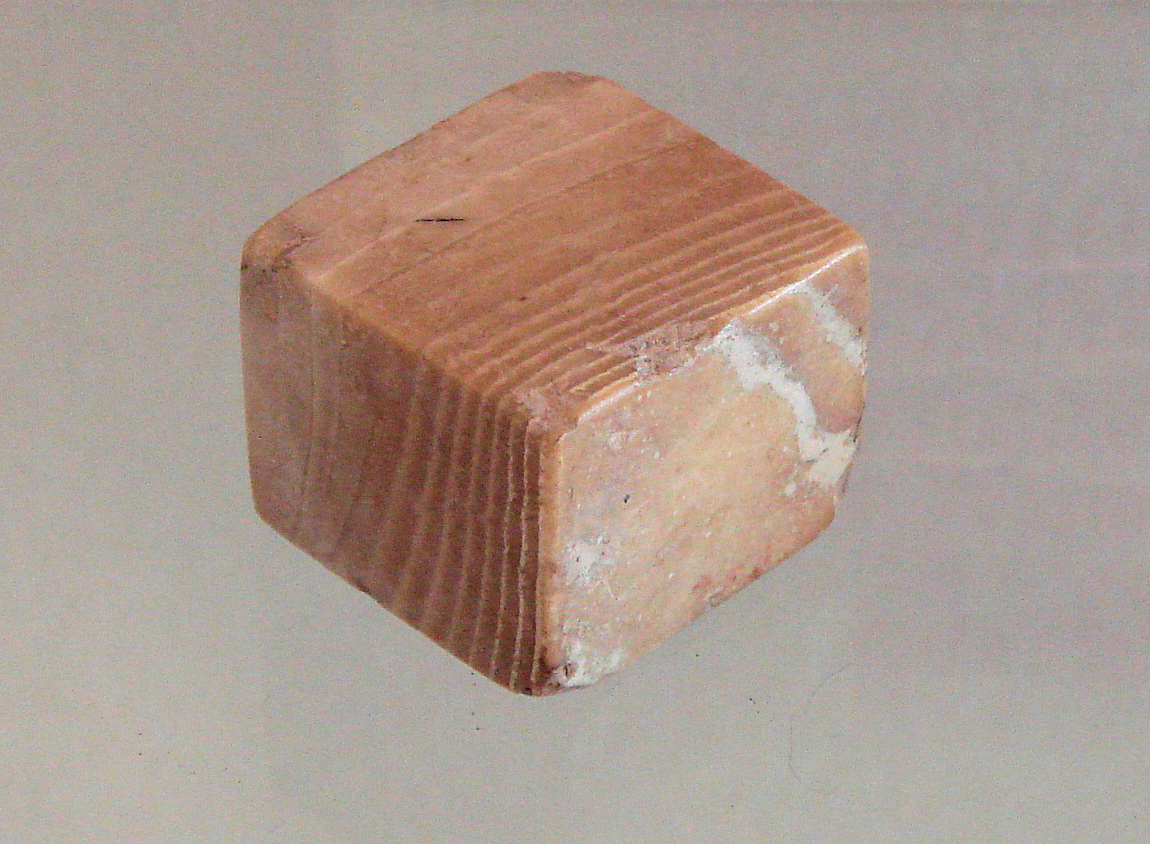
Weight in veined jasper (Louvre Museum)

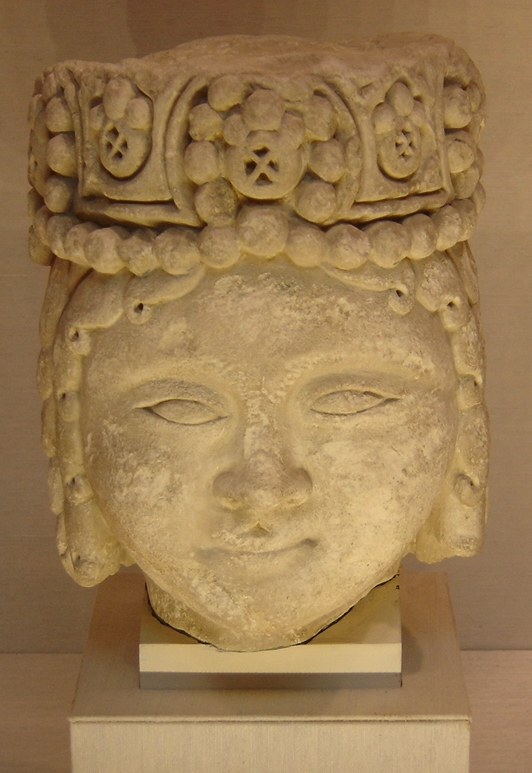
Iranian male royal figure (Metropolitan Museum of Art)

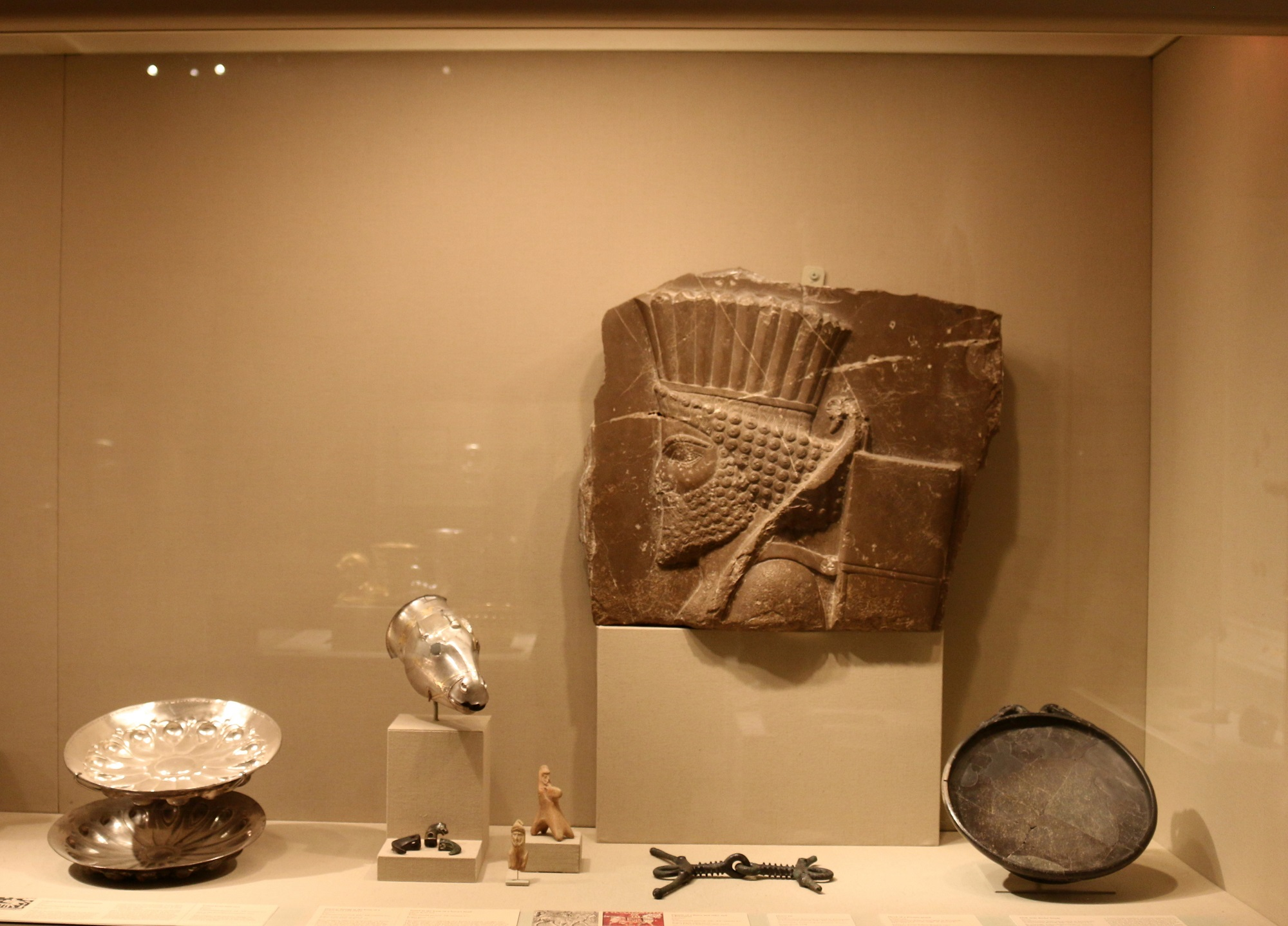
Persian objects (Metropolitan Museum of Art)

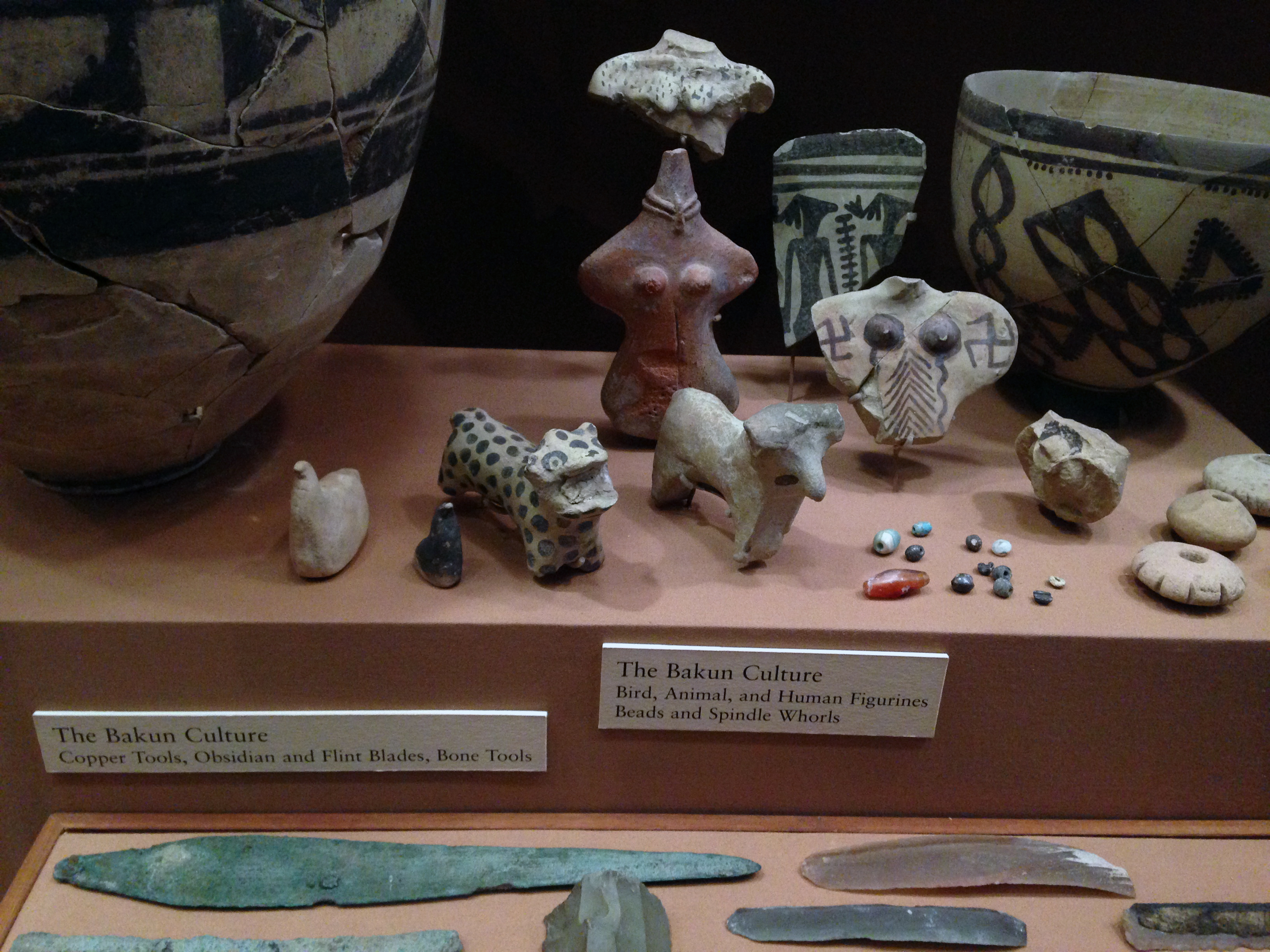
Artifacts of Tall-i Bakun in University of Chicago Oriental Institute

== See also ==
- Antiochus cylinder
- Babylonian Chronicles
- Babylonian Map of the World
- Cylinders of Nabonidus
- Cyrus Cylinder
- Gilgamesh flood myth
- Greater Iran
- Jar of Xerxes I
- Yale Babylonian Collection Alabastron Vessel
- Kurkh Monoliths
- Lachish reliefs
- Lakh Mazar
- Library of Ashurbanipal
- Lion Hunt of Ashurbanipal
- Persian Inscriptions on Indian Monuments
- Rassam cylinder
- Sennacherib's Annals
- Tall-i Bakun
- Xerxes I inscription at Van

== Bibliography ==
- Forgotten Empire: The World of Ancient Persia by John Curtis (Editor), Nigel Tallis.
- Ancient Persia: A Concise History of the Achaemenid Empire, 550–330 BCE Paperback – Illustrated, January 20, 2014 by Matt Waters (Author).
- Boardman, Sir John, "The Oxus Scabbard", Iran, Vol. 44, (2006), pp. 115–119, British Institute of Persian Studies, JSTOR
- Collon, Dominique, "Oxus Treasure", Grove Art Online, Oxford Art Online, Oxford University Press, accessed 4 July 2013, subscription required.
- Curtis, John, The Oxus Treasure, British Museum Objects in Focus series, 2012, British Museum Press, ISBN 9780714150796
- Curtis, John, "The Oxus Treasure in the British Museum", Ancient Civilizations from Scythia to Siberia, Vol. 10 (2004), pp. 293–338
- "Curtis and Tallis", Curtis, John and Tallis, Nigel (eds), Forgotten Empire - The World of Ancient Persia (catalogue of British Museum exhibition), 2005, University of California Press/British Museum, ISBN 9780714111575, google books
- Dalton, O.M., The Treasure Of The Oxus With Other Objects From Ancient Persia And India, 1905 (nb, not the final 3rd edition of 1963), British Museum, online at archive.org, catalogs 177 objects, with a long introduction.
- Frankfort, Henri, The Art and Architecture of the Ancient Orient, Pelican History of Art, 4th ed 1970, Penguin (now Yale History of Art), ISBN 0140561072
- Mongiatti, Aude; Meeks, Nigel & Simpson, St John (2010). "A gold four-horse model chariot from the Oxus Treasure: a fine illustration of Achaemenid goldwork" (PDF). The British Museum Technical Research Bulletin. 4. British Museum: 27–38. ISBN 9781904982555.
- Muscarella, Oscar White, Archaeology, Artifacts and Antiquities of the Ancient Near East: Sites, Cultures, and Proveniences, 2013, BRILL, ISBN 9004236694, 9789004236691, google books
- Yamauchi, Edwin M., review of The Treasure of the Oxus with Other Examples of Early Oriental Metal-Work, Journal of the American Oriental Society, Vol. 90, No. 2 (Apr. - Jun., 1970), pp. 340–343, JSTOR
- "Zeymal": "E. V. Zeymal (1932-1998)", obituary by John Curtis, Iran, Vol. 37, (1999), pp. v-vi, British Institute of Persian Studies, JSTOR
- Arberry, A.J. (1953). The Legacy of Persia. Oxford: Clarendon Press. ISBN 978-0-19-821905-7. OCLC 1283292.
- Arnold, Bill T.; Michalowski, Piotr (2006). "Achaemenid Period Historical Texts Concerning Mesopotamia". In Chavelas, Mark W. (ed.). The Ancient Near East: Historical Sources in Translation. London: Blackwell. ISBN 978-0-631-23581-1.
- Bedford, Peter Ross (2000). Temple Restoration in Early Achaemenid Judah. Leiden: Brill. ISBN 978-90-04-11509-5.
- Beaulieu, P.-A. (Oct 1993). "An Episode in the Fall of Babylon to the Persians". Journal of Near Eastern Studies. 52 (4): 241–261. doi:10.1086/373633. S2CID 162399298.
- Becking, Bob (2006). ""We All Returned as One!": Critical Notes on the Myth of the Mass Return". In Lipschitz, Oded; Oeming, Manfred (eds.). Judah and the Judeans in the Persian period. Winona Lake, IN: Eisenbrauns. ISBN 978-1-57506-104-7.
- Bidmead, Julye (2004). The Akitu Festival: Religious Continuity And Royal Legitimation In Mesopotamia. Piscataway, NJ: Gorgias Press LLC. ISBN 978-1-59333-158-0.
- Briant, Pierre (2006). From Cyrus to Alexander: A History of the Persian Empire. Winona Lake, IN: Eisenbraun. ISBN 978-1-57506-120-7.
- Brown, Dale (1996). Persians: Masters of Empire. Alexandra, VA: Time-Life Books. ISBN 978-0-8094-9104-9.
- Buchanan, G. (1964). "The Foundation and Extension of the Persian Empire". In Bury, J.B.; Cook, S.A.; Adcock, F.E. (eds.). The Cambridge Ancient History: IV. The Persian Empire and the West. Cambridge: Cambridge University Press. OCLC 57550495.
- Curtis, John; Tallis, Nigel; André-Salvini, Béatrice (2005). Forgotten Empire: The World of Ancient Persia. Berkeley: University of California Press. ISBN 978-0-520-24731-4.
- Dandamaev, M.A. (1989). A political history of the Achaemenid Empire. Leiden: Brill. ISBN 978-90-04-09172-6.
- Daniel, Elton L. (2000). The History of Iran. Westport, CT: Greenwood Publishing Group. ISBN 978-0-313-30731-7.
- Dick, Michael B. (2004). "The "History of David's Rise to Power" and the Neo-Babylonian Succession Apologies". In Batto, Bernard Frank; Roberts, Kathryn L.; McBee Roberts, Jimmy Jack (eds.). David and Zion: Biblical Studies in Honor of J.J.M. Roberts. Winona Lake, IN: Eisenbrauns. ISBN 978-1-57506-092-7.
- Dusinberre, Elspeth R. M. (2013). Empire, Authority, and Autonomy in Achaemenid Anatolia. Cambridge University Press. ISBN 978-1107577152.
- Dyck, Jonathan E. (1998). The Theocratic Ideology of the Chronicler. Leiden: Brill. ISBN 978-90-04-11146-2.
- Fowler, Richard; Hekster, Olivier (2005). Imaginary kings: royal images in the ancient Near East, Greece and Rome. Stuttgart: Franz Steiner Verlag. ISBN 978-3-515-08765-0.
- Free, Joseph P.; Vos, Howard Frederic (1992). Vos, Howard Frederic (ed.). Archaeology and Bible history. Grand Rapids, MI: Zondervan. ISBN 978-0-310-47961-1.
- Fried, Lisbeth S. (2004). The priest and the great king: temple-palace relations in the Persian Empire. Winona Lake, IN: Eisenbrauns. ISBN 978-1-57506-090-3.
- Grabbe, Lester L. (2004). A History of the Jews and Judaism in the Second Temple Period: Yehud, the Persian Province of Judah. London: Continuum International Publishing Group. ISBN 978-0-567-08998-4.
- Grabbe, Lester L. (2006). "The "Persian Documents" in the Book of Ezra: Are They Authentic?". In Lipschitz, Oded; Oeming, Manfred (eds.). Judah and the Judeans in the Persian period. Winona Lake, IN: Eisenbrauns. ISBN 978-1-57506-104-7.
- Hallo, William (2002). Hallo, William; Younger, K. Lawson (eds.). The Context of Scripture: Monumental inscriptions from the biblical world. Vol. 2. Leiden: Brill. ISBN 978-90-04-10619-2.
- Haubold, Johannes (2007). "Xerxes' Homer". In Bridges, Emma; Hall, Edith; Rhodes, P.J. (eds.). Cultural Responses to the Persian Wars: Antiquity to the Third Millennium. Oxford: Oxford University Press. ISBN 978-0-19-927967-8.
- Hilprecht, Hermann Volrath (1903). Explorations in Bible lands during the 19th century. Philadelphia: A.J. Molman and Company.
- Janzen, David (2002). Witch-hunts, purity and social boundaries: the expulsion of the foreign women in Ezra 9–10. London: Sheffield Academic Press. ISBN 978-1-84127-292-4.
- Khatchadourian, Lori (2016). Imperial Matter: Ancient Persia and the Archaeology of Empires. University of California Press. ISBN 978-0520964952.
- Koldewey, Robert; Griffith Johns, Agnes Sophia (1914). The excavations at Babylon. London: MacMillan & co.
- Kuhrt, Amélie (1982). "Babylonia from Cyrus to Xerxes". In Boardman, John (ed.). The Cambridge Ancient History: Vol IV – Persia, Greece and the Western Mediterranean. Cambridge: Cambridge University Press. ISBN 978-0-521-22804-6.
- Kuhrt, Amélie (1983). "The Cyrus Cylinder and Achaemenid imperial policy". Journal for the Study of the Old Testament. 25. ISSN 1476-6728.
- Kuhrt, Amélie (2007). The Persian Empire: A Corpus of Sources of the Achaemenid Period. London: Routledge. ISBN 978-0-415-43628-1.
- Kuhrt, Amélie (2007b). "Cyrus the Great of Persia: Images and Realities". In Heinz, Marlies; Feldman, Marian H. (eds.). Representations of Political Power: Case Histories from Times of Change and Dissolving Order in the Ancient Near East. Winona Lake, IN: Eisenbrauns. ISBN 978-1-57506-135-1.
- Lincoln, Bruce (2007). Religion, empire and torture: the case of Achaemenian Persia, with a postscript on Abu Ghraib. Chicago: University of Chicago Press. ISBN 978-0-226-48196-8.
- Llewellyn-Jones, Lloyd (2009). "The First Persian Empire 550–330BC". In Harrison, Thomas (ed.). The Great Empires of the Ancient World. Getty Publications. p. 104. ISBN 978-0-89236-987-4.
- Mallowan, Max (1968). "Cyrus the Great (558-529 B.C.)". In Frye, Richard Nelson; Fisher, William Bayne (eds.). The Cambridge History of Iran. Vol. 2, The Median and Achaemenian periods. Cambridge: Cambridge University Press. ISBN 978-0-521-20091-2. OCLC 40820893.
- Mitchell, T.C. (1988). Biblical Archaeology: Documents from the British Museum. London: Cambridge University Press. ISBN 978-0-521-36867-4.
- Pahlavi, Mohammed Reza (1967). The White Revolution of Iran. Imperial Pahlavi Library.
- Pritchard, James Bennett, ed. (1973). The Ancient Near East, Volume I: An Anthology of Texts and Pictures. Princeton: Princeton University Press. OCLC 150577756.
- Shabani, Reza (2005). Iranian History at a Glance. Mahmood Farrokhpey (trans.). London: Alhoda UK. ISBN 978-964-439-005-0.
- van der Spek, R.J. (1982). "Did Cyrus the Great introduce a new policy towards subdued nations? Cyrus in Assyrian perspective". Persica. 10. OCLC 499757419.
- Walker, C.B.F. (1972). "A recently identified fragment of the Cyrus Cylinder". Iran: Journal of the British Institute of Persian Studies. 10 (10): 158–159. doi:10.2307/4300475. ISSN 0578-6967. JSTOR 4300475.
- Wiesehöfer, Josef (2001). Ancient Persia: From 550 BC to 650 AD. London: I.B. Tauris. ISBN 978-1-86064-675-1.
- Weissbach, Franz Heinrich (1911). Die Keilinschriften der Achämeniden. Vorderasiatische Bibliotek (in German). Leipzig: J. C. Hinrichs.
- Winn Leith, Mary Joan (1998). "Israel among the Nations: The Persian Period". In Coogan, Michael David (ed.). The Oxford History of the Biblical World. Oxford: Oxford University Press. ISBN 978-0-19-513937-2.
- Farrokh, Kaveh (2007). "Cyrus the Great and early Achaemenids". Shadows in the Desert: Ancient Persia at War. Oxford: Osprey Publishing. ISBN 978-1-84603-108-3.
- Lauren, Paul Gordon (2003). "Philosophical Visions: Human Nature, Natural Law, and Natural Rights". The Evolution of International Human Rights: Visions Seen. Philadelphia: University of Pennsylvania Press. ISBN 978-0-8122-1854-1.
