= Xerxes I inscription at Van =

Cuneiform inscription near Lake Van, Turkey

Inscription of Xerxes the Great near the Van Fortress, written in Old Persian, Elamite and Babylonian

Location of Xerxes I's inscription at Van

The Xerxes I inscription at Van, also known as the XV Achaemenid royal inscription, is a trilingual cuneiform inscription of the Achaemenid King Xerxes I (r. 486–465 BC). It is located on the southern slope of a mountain adjacent to the Van Fortress, near Lake Van in present-day Turkey. When inscribed it was located in the Achaemenid province of Armenia. The inscription is inscribed on a smoothed section of the rock face near the fortress, approximately 20 metres (70 feet) above the ground. The niche was originally carved out by Xerxes' father, King Darius (r. 522–486 BC), but he left the surface blank.

== Text ==
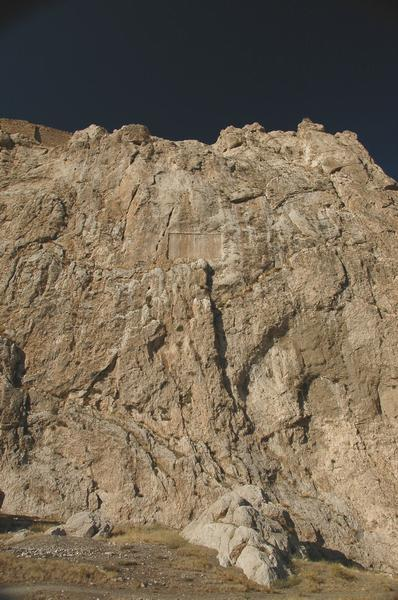
The inscription, located high up on the cliff

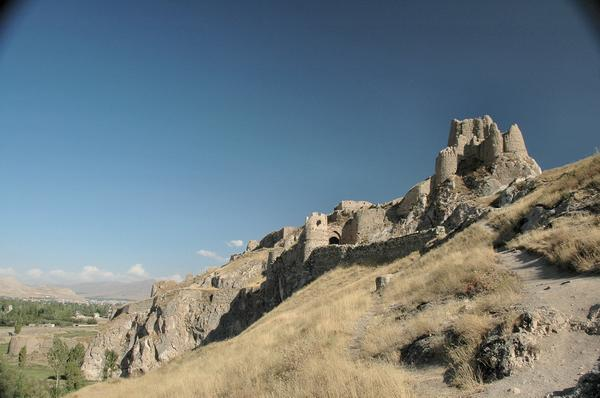
Van Citadel, approach from the west

The inscription consists of 27 lines of writing in Old Persian, Elamite and Babylonian. The inscription reads the same in each language. A translation into English reads:

"A great god is Ahuramazda, the greatest of the gods, who created this earth, who created yonder sky, who created man, created happiness for man, who made Xerxes king, one king of many, one lord of many.
I (am) Xerxes, the great king, king of kings, king of all kinds of people, king on this earth far and wide, the son of Darius the king, the Achaemenid.
Xerxes the great king proclaims: King Darius, my father, by the favor of Ahuramazda, made much that is good, and this niche he ordered to be cut; as he did not have an inscription written, then I ordered that this inscription be written.
He may Ahuramazda protect, together with the gods, and my kingdom and what I have done."

== Position ==
Placed high off the ground, in a region where there was very little literacy, the text had an additional meaning for those who were able to read, or to whom it was read aloud. In the opening sentence, Xerxes I mentions Ahuramazda, thus connecting himself to the religion of his father Darius, making use of language similar to that his father used for his imperial inscriptions in Iran proper. In this inscription, Xerxes I makes it clear that he reigns through the legitimation of his god Ahuramazda, the greatest god, the creator god. By mentioning his descent from Darius, Xerxes I asserts that he is the lawful ruler of the Achaemenid Empire. Xerxes I also shows that he is a good son and a good king, as he finished the work initiated by his father. According to Elspeth R. M. Dusinberre (2013): "The inscription practically reiterates the campaign against Greece that was responsible for Xerxes' personal presence in Anatolia". She thus concludes that the inscription at Van is far from "a mildly risible description of filling an empty space; rather, it serves as a highly visible and exceptionally powerful royal statement of empire and authority, situated in a spot charged with historical meaning and kingly significance".

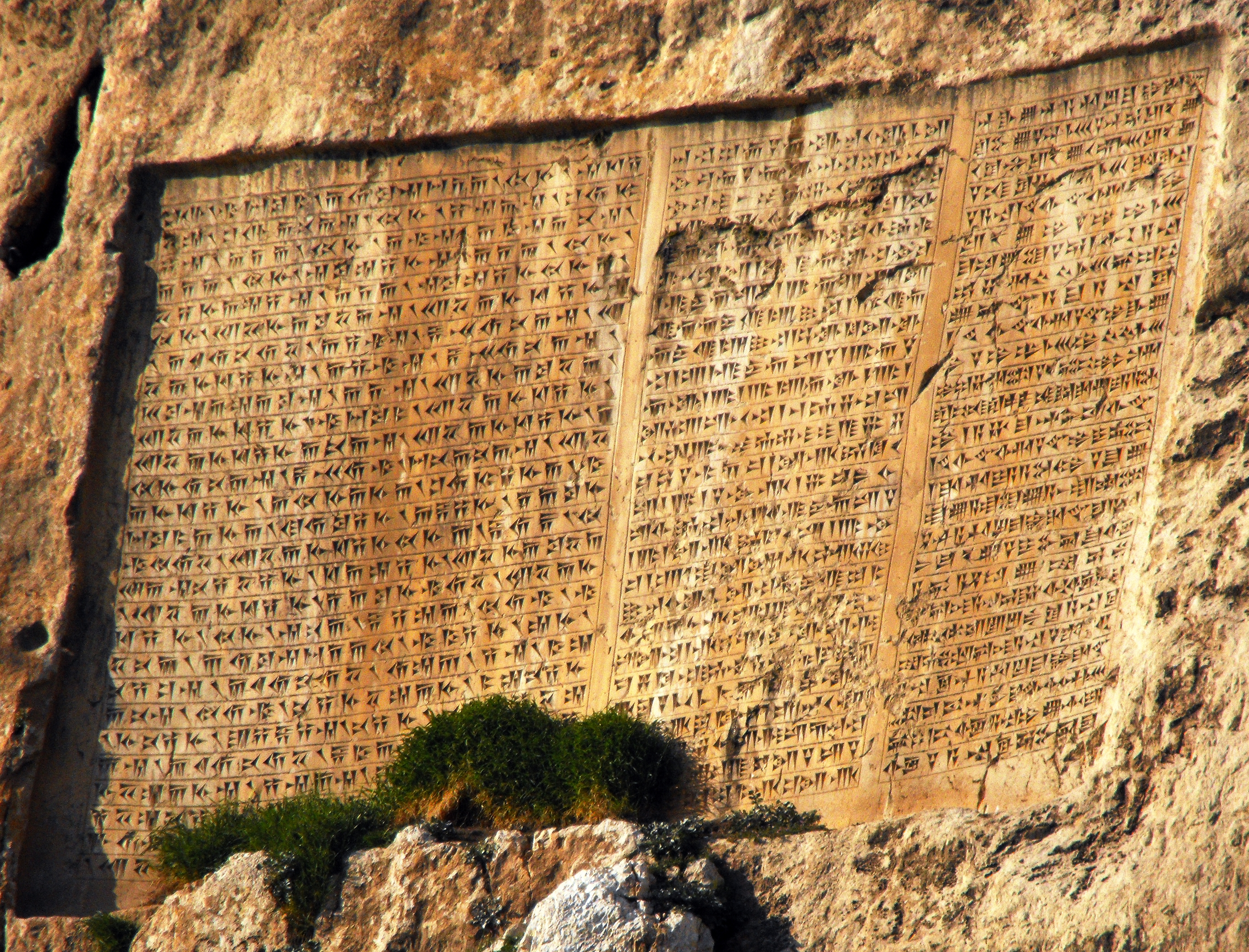
Another photograph of the inscription

Amélie Kuhrt (2007) wonders why Darius chose this particular spot for an inscription: "The siting of the niche is in a prominent position, but the reason for Darius' wish to leave an inscription here in particular is unknown. Could it have been connected with the many battles he fought in this region following the seizure of the throne?". Lori Khatchadourian (2016) states that the spot was specifically chosen to show that the area was now part of another power. By placing the inscription at the fortress of Tushpa (i.e. the Van Fortress), in the center of the former entity of Urartu, Darius and Xerxes "were making a claim on the former foundations of authority that had long prevailed in the region", now remade as a province of the Achaemenid Empire.

== Assessment ==
The inscription at Van carries numerous messages. Being one of only few attested Old Persian inscriptions outside Iran, it "overtly extends kingly reach into the "mountains and valleys of Anatolia" according to Dusinberre. According to Dusinberre, by making use of only "Mesopotamian and Persian languages", the Achaemenid kings made a firm statement about that kingly reach: "This is a conquering overlord, a foreigner of power, who now exerts authority over the ancient lands of Urartu". The fact that the inscription was not translated into the local language supports this, according to Dusinberre. There had been a long history of military conflict between Urartu and Assyria; the choice of these specific languages was an outright affirmation of Achaemenid control over Armenia, and of Achaemenid military superiority over Assyria. Dusinberre adds that the Old Persian text takes up twice as much room as the Babylonian and Elamite versions. Furthermore, the Old Persian text is "carved slightly larger" and with more "generous spacing between the characters". According to Dusinberre: "This may be intended similarly to convey a comment about the superiority of the Achaemenid Persians over the ancient Mesopotamian peoples". As the inscription is located high off the ground, and so is difficult to read from ground level, Dusinberre deems these small visual details important.

== See also ==
- History of Achaemenid Egypt
- List of Iranian artifacts abroad

== Languages ==
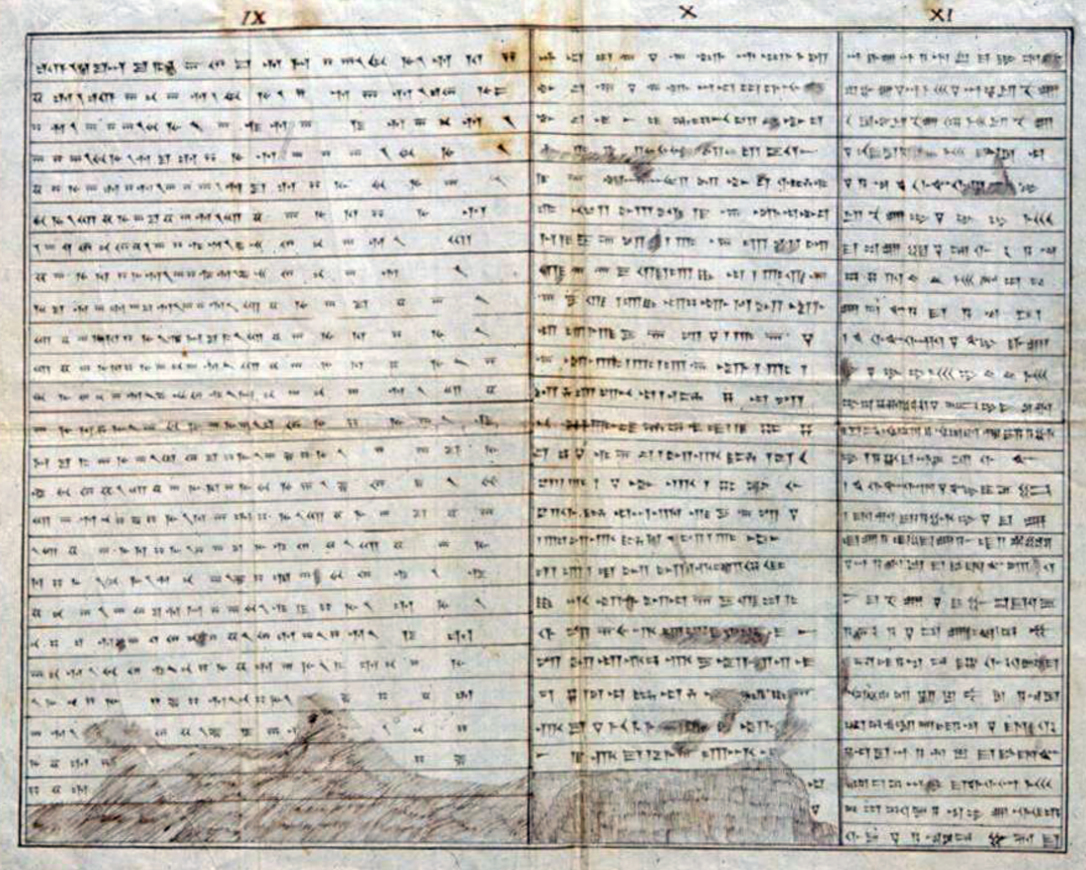
Xerxes I inscription at Van, copy by Friedrich Eduard Schulz in 1827

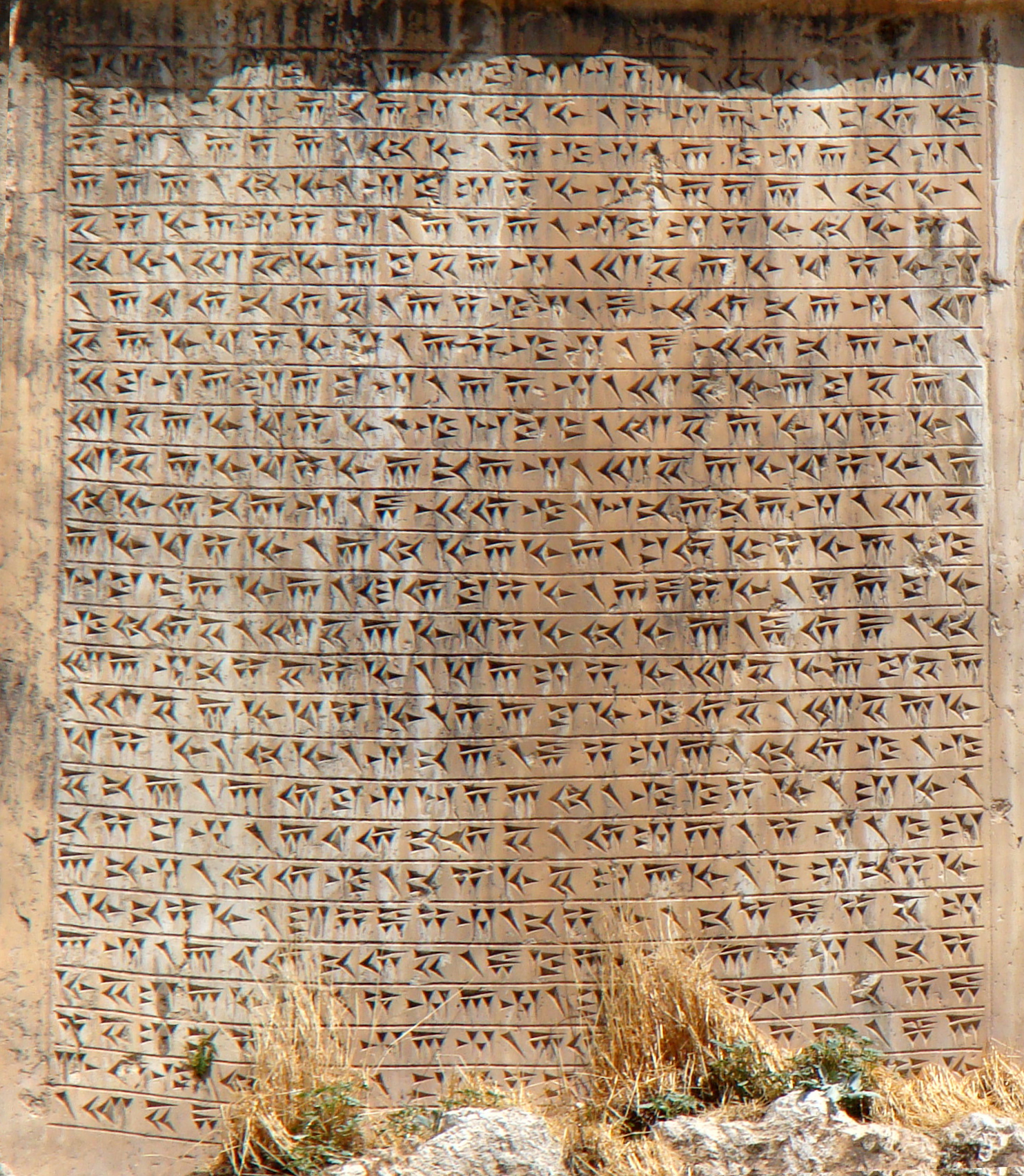
Inscription in Old Persian

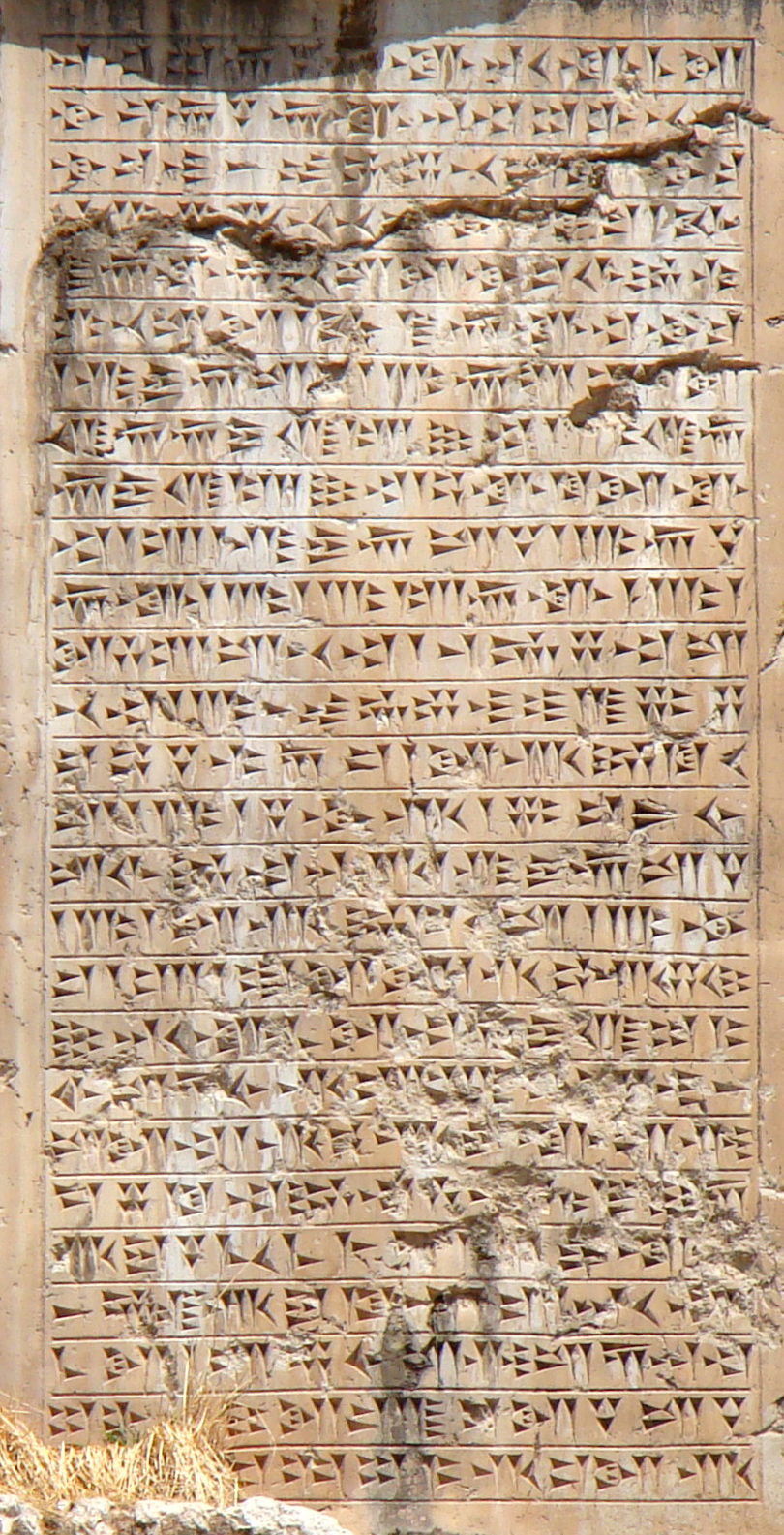
Inscription in Elamite

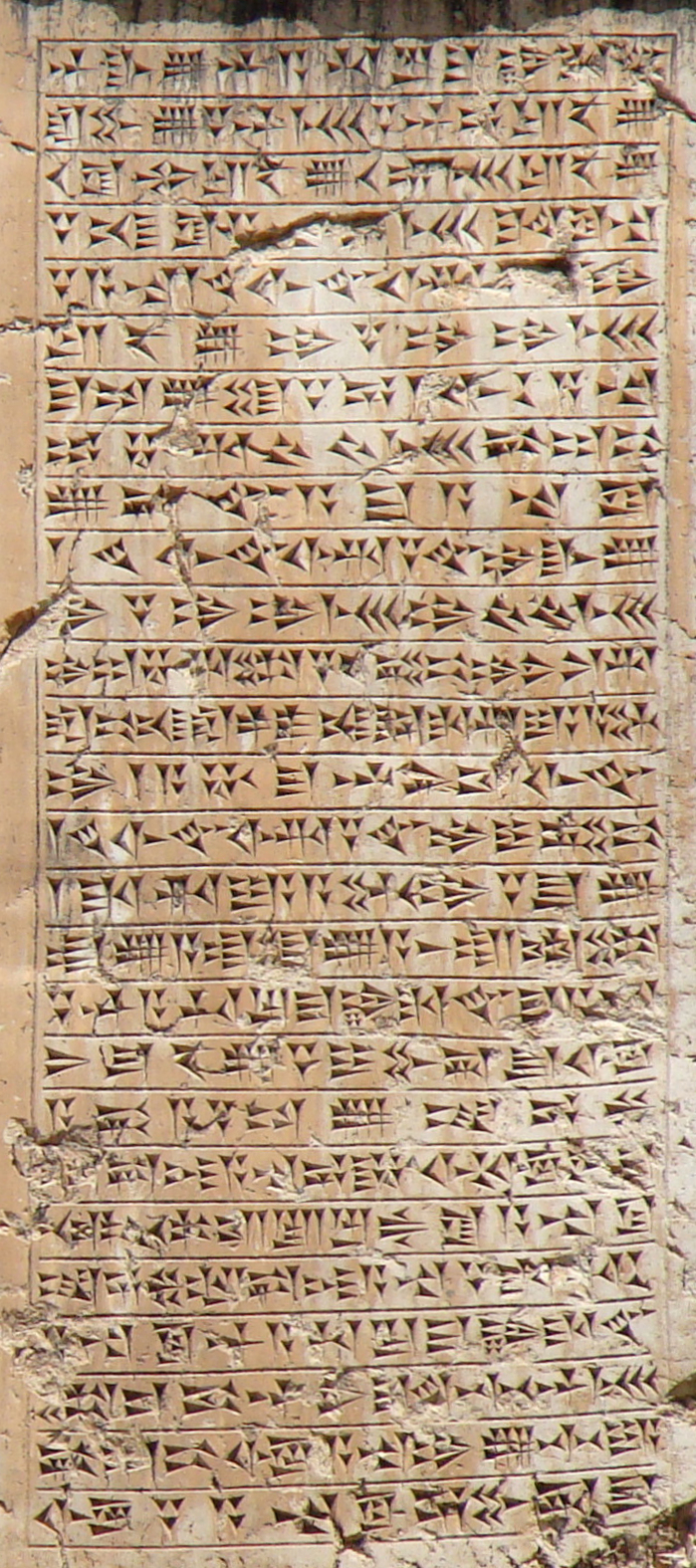
Inscription in Babylonian

== Sources ==
- Dusinberre, Elspeth R. M. (2013). Empire, Authority, and Autonomy in Achaemenid Anatolia. Cambridge University Press. ISBN 978-1107577152.
- Khatchadourian, Lori (2016). Imperial Matter: Ancient Persia and the Archaeology of Empires. University of California Press. ISBN 978-0520964952.
- Kuhrt, Amélie (2007). The Persian Empire: A Corpus of Sources from the Achaemenid Period. Routledge. ISBN 978-0415552790.
