= Phoenician finds at Oluz Höyük =

Archaeological discoveries in Turkey

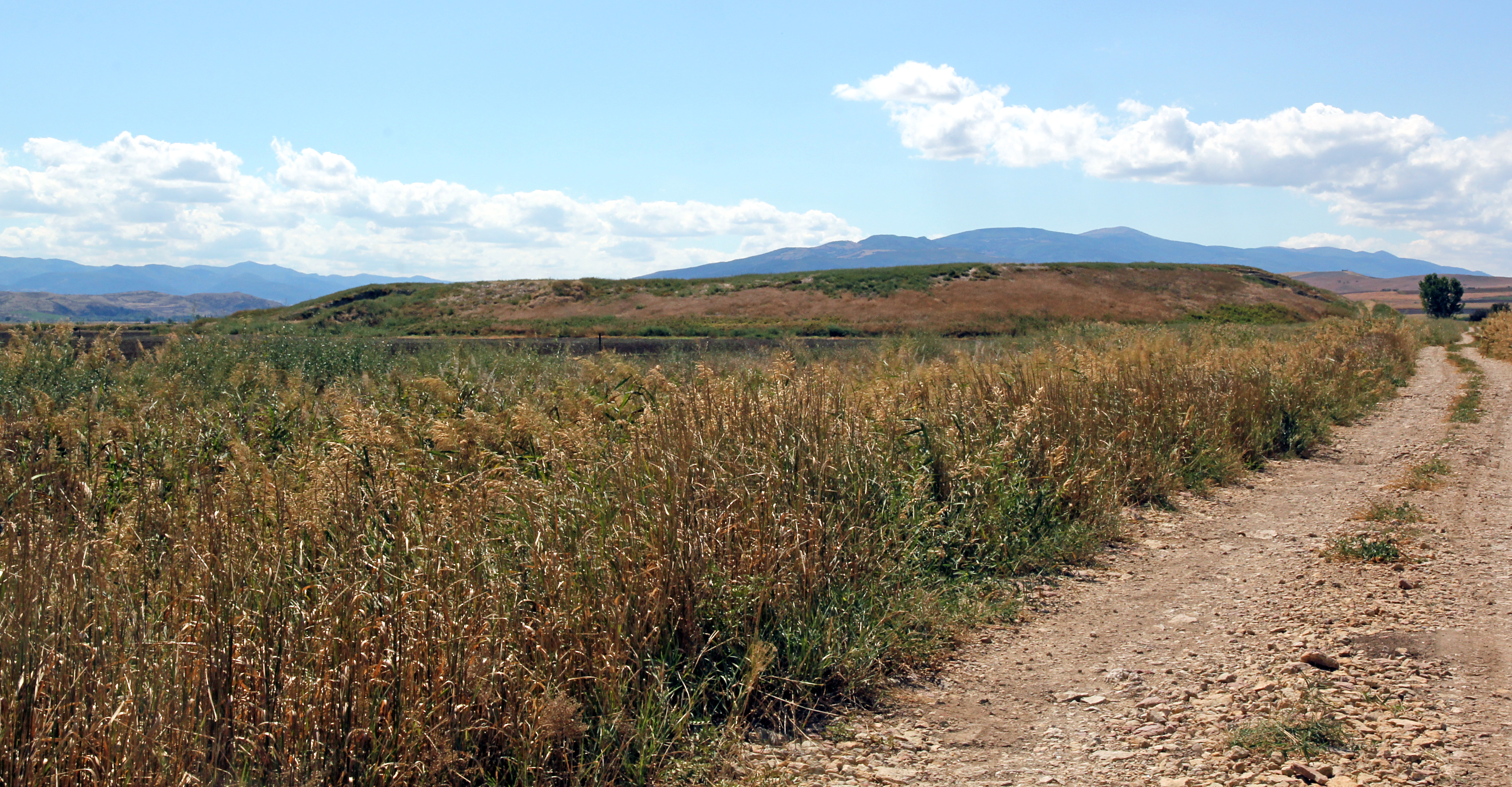
The tell of Oluz Höyük

Phoenician finds at Oluz Höyük are a collection of archaeological discoveries made at the multi-layered settlement of Oluz Höyük in Amasya Province, Turkey. Announced in late 2025, the finds include human-faced glass beads and a group of infant jar burials, which together suggest a previously undocumented presence or strong cultural influence of the Phoenicians deep within Anatolia during the Iron Age. The discoveries were made during excavations led by Professor Şevket Dönmez of Istanbul University.

== Background ==
Oluz Höyük is a significant tell in north-central Anatolia, near the modern city of Amasya, with a history of settlement spanning approximately 6,500 years. Excavations at the site began in 2007 and have revealed ten distinct occupational layers, including architectural remains from the Hittite, Phrygian, and Persian periods. The site is considered a key location for understanding the political, religious, and cultural transformations of the region.

== Discoveries ==
The evidence suggesting a Phoenician connection consists of three main components: distinctive glass artifacts, a unique burial practice, and the architectural style of a sanctuary.

=== Human-faced glass beads ===
Among the artifacts recovered were small glass beads shaped like human faces. Dönmez compared the beads with Phoenician examples, including material associated with Carthage. Such beads were widely traded in antiquity and are often interpreted as protective amulets. Their discovery in central Anatolia suggests that Phoenician trade networks extended much farther inland than previously assumed. Professor Dönmez had previously noted the presence of Phoenician-style glass beads at the site in earlier scholarly publications.

=== Infant jar burials ===
Excavators also found up to eight infant and fetal burials in ceramic jars. The jars were carefully arranged with deliberate spacing across a sacred area of the site. Excavation director Dönmez stated that this funerary practice has "no known parallel elsewhere in Anatolia," setting it apart from traditional regional burial customs.

=== Sanctuary architecture ===
The infant burials were found within a temple precinct dedicated to the ancient Anatolian goddess Kubaba. The sanctuary's architectural plan features a long, narrow layout, described as a "megaroid" plan, which closely resembles known temple designs of the Arameans and Phoenicians in the Eastern Mediterranean. Dönmez noted that the architectural parallels were "striking" and suggested that the presence of a Semitic-origin community like the Phoenicians in central Anatolia was surprising.

== Interpretation and significance ==
Dönmez has proposed a Phoenician connection on the basis of the glass beads, jar burials, and architectural parallels.

Dönmez has also raised a possible comparison with infant burials from Phoenician contexts, while emphasizing that osteological study is required before the nature of the Oluz Höyük burials can be determined.

Researchers caution that any direct cultural parallel must be evaluated scientifically. Dönmez stressed that only detailed osteological and anthropological studies can determine whether the children died of natural causes or were part of a ritual tradition, and thus confirm the link to the Tophet tradition.

== See also ==
- Phoenicia
- Tophet
- Kubaba
- Archaeology of Turkey

== Sources ==
- Altuntaş, Leman (2025a). "Anatolia's First Phoenician Find: Human-Faced Glass Beads and Baby Jar Burials Unearthed". Arkeonews.
- Altuntaş, Leman (2025b). "Possible Phoenician Infant Jar Burials Discovered at Oluz Höyük in Central Anatolia". Anatolian Archaeology.
- Moeed, Abdul (December 30, 2025). "Ancient Artifacts and Rare Burials Found in Central Anatolia Point to Phoenician Presence". Greek Reporter.
- Dönmez, Şevket (2015). "Achaemenid presence at Oluz Höyük, north-central Anatolia". In Şevket Dönmez (ed.). The Danubian Lands between the Black, Aegean and Adriatic Seas. Archaeopress. p. 495.
- Dönmez, Şevket; Saba, M (2019). "New Discoveries at Oluz Höyük: An Early Zoroastrian Sanctuary in North-Central Anatolia". In S. R. Steadman; G. McMahon (eds.). The Archaeology of Anatolia, Volume III. Cambridge Scholars Publishing. pp. 112–121.
