= Oluz Höyük =

Archaeological site in Amasya, Turkey

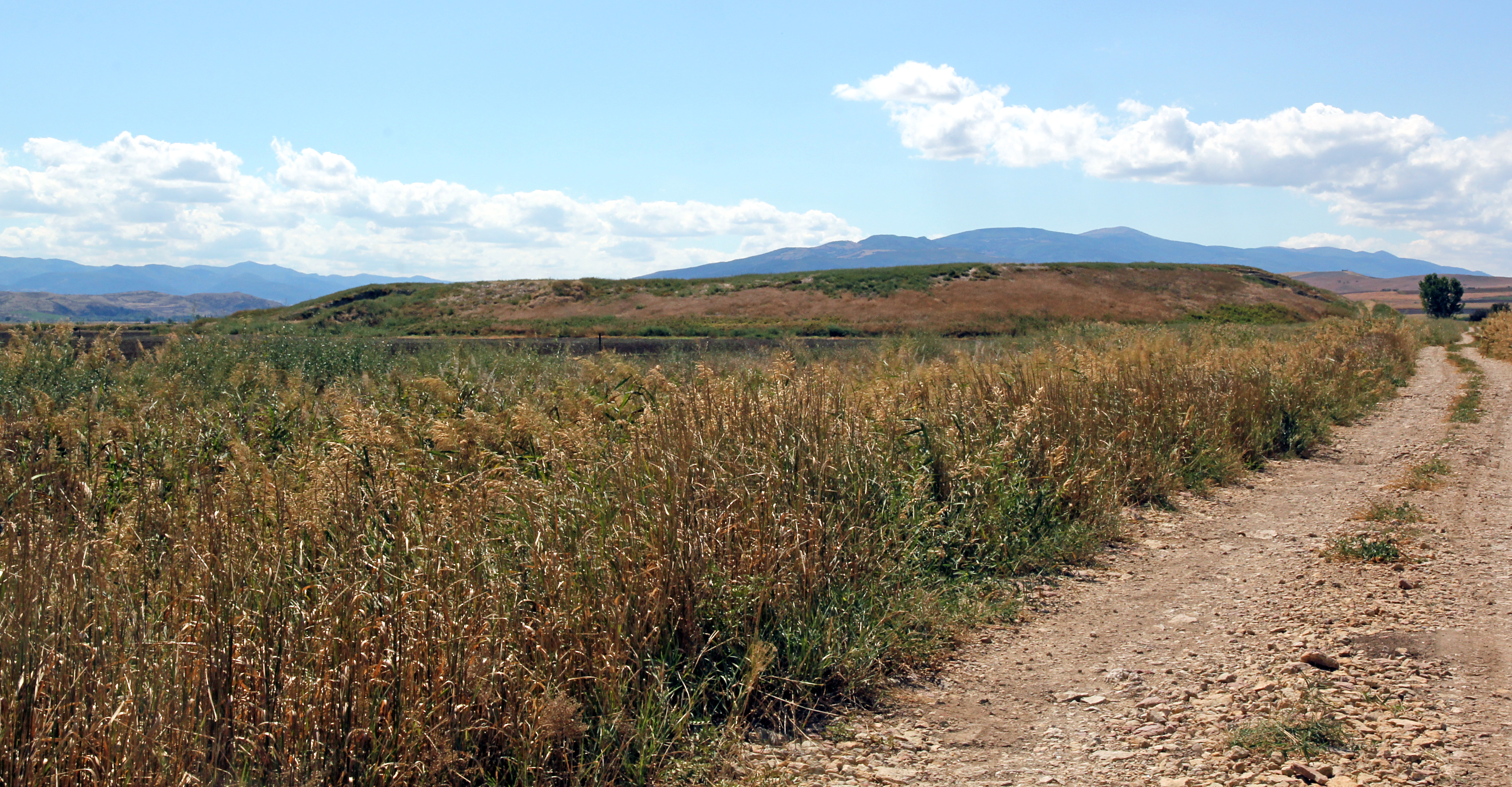
- The tell in 2022

- Location within Turkey
- 40°32′44″N 35°37′43″E
- Type: settlement mound
- Periods: Early Bronze Age, Iron Age, Classical
- Cultures: Hittite, Phrygian, Achaemenid, Hellenistic
- Location: Amasya Province, Turkey
- Region: Black Sea region

Site notes
- Excavation dates: Excavations since 2007
- Archaeologists: Şevket Dönmez
- Discovered: 1999

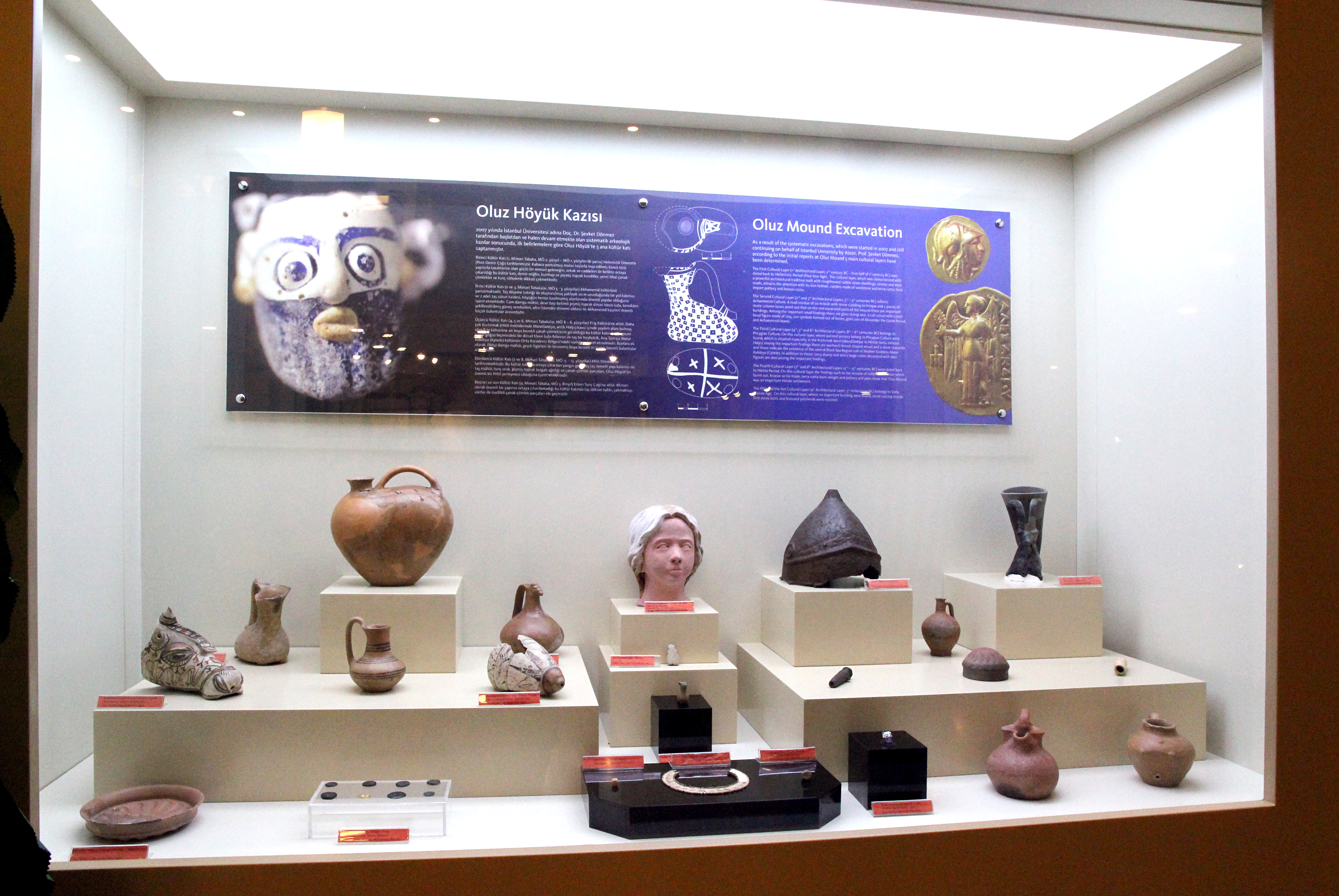
Various finds from Oluz Höyük exhibited in the Amasya Museum.

Oluz Höyük is an archaeological site located in the Amasya Province of north-central Anatolia, Turkey. Situated 25 kilometers (16 mi) southwest of the city of Amasya in the Çekerek River valley, the site is a multi-layered settlement mound (höyük) with occupation extending from at least the Early Bronze Age to the Middle Ages; with earlier material also reported. Excavations led by Şevket Dönmez since 2007, have uncovered remains from the Achaemenid (Persian) and Phrygian periods, including a structure interpreted by the excavators as a fire temple (atashkadeh) and a monumental road.

== Location ==
Oluz Höyük is located on the fertile Gelgiden plain, near the village of Gözlek. The mound is nearly circular and rises approximately 15 meters (49 ft) above the surrounding plain. It sits in the valley of the Çekerek River, which was known as the Zuliya in Hittite times and the Skylax in Classical antiquity.

== Excavation history ==
Oluz Höyük was identified by the team of Şevket Dönmez of Istanbul University during archaeological surveys of Amasya Province conducted between 1997 and 1999. Systematic archaeological excavations began in 2007 under Dönmez's direction and have continued since. Excavations have identified ten successive settlement layers, extending from the Chalcolithic period to the Middle Ages.

== Finds ==
Early Bronze Age finds include pottery, plastered floor fragments, a stone casting mould, a marble idol and a terracotta stamp seal. Evidence from the Iron Age period surrounding the collapse of the Hittite Great Kingdom includes carbonized wheat and vetch seeds from, which the excavators have interpreted as evidence of ritual activity. During the Phrygian period, a sanctuary centred on an altar dedicated to Kubaba occupied the settlement. The altar, dated by the excavators to around 600 BC, was associated with a fragmentary stone statuette of the goddess and other votive objects. The 2B architectural layer, dated to the Persian period approximately 450–300 BC, contains Achaemenid remains. These include a paved road known as the Persian Road, a structure interpreted as an atashkadeh or fire sanctuary, and an adjacent pillared worship hall supported by six columns. The excavators interpret the complex as evidence for early forms of Zoroastrian religious practice at the settlement. Finds from the Achaemenid levels include a human-headed glass bead described by the excavators as Phoenician in type, as well as Achaemenid bowls, a phiale, a terracotta rhyton and other luxury objects. Hellenistic occupation is represented by the first architectural layer. Initial excavations dated this phase to the late second and early first centuries BC on the basis of pottery and coin finds; architectural remains include stone foundations, paved surfaces, and a substantial building complex. Medieval glazed pottery dating approximately from the 10th to 14th centuries AD indicates later occupation of the mound. In 2024, the excavation team announced the discovery of another fire altar, which Dönmez attributed to a Median phase of the site around the beginning of the sixth century BC. He interpreted the structure as an earlier Phrygian altar that had subsequently been modified for fire rituals.

== See also ==
- Phoenician finds at Oluz Höyük – Archaeological discoveries in Turkey

== Sources ==
- Altuntaş, Leman (30 December 2025). "Anatolia's First Phoenician Find: Human-Faced Glass Beads and Baby Jar Burials Unearthed". Arkeonews.
- Beyazıt, A. Y. (2019). "An Early Bronze Age Site in North-Central Anatolia: Oluz Höyük". DergiPark.
- Dönmez, Şevket; Dönmez, E. Emine Naza (2009). "Amasya-Oluz Höyük Excavation: 2007 Season Work - Preliminary Results". Belleten. 73 (267). Türk Tarih Kurumu: 395–422. doi:10.37879/belleten.2009.395. ISSN 0041-4255.
- Dönmez, Şevket; Saba, Mona (2023). "Demir Çağı Kappadokia'sında İlk Tapınak: Oluz Höyük İbadethane ve Ateşgedesi" [The First Temple in Iron Age Cappadocia: The Sanctuary and Fire Temple at Oluz Höyük]. Höyük (in Turkish). 0 (12). Türk Tarih Kurumu: 57–78. doi:10.37879/hoyuk.2023.2.057. ISSN 1309-8780.
- Dönmez, Şevket; Saba, Mona (2019). "Chapter Nine: New Discoveries at Oluz Höyük: An Early Zoroastrian Sanctuary in North-Central Anatolia". In Steadman, S.R.; McMahon, G. (eds.). The Archaeology of Anatolia. Vol. III. Recent Discoveries (2017-2018). Newcastle upon Tyne, UK: Cambridge Scholars Publishing. pp. 112–121. ISBN 9781527542365. OCLC 1291010287.
- Dönmez, Şevket (2019). "The Land of Sacred Fire: Amasya - Oluz Höyük". In Tsetskhladze, G. R. (ed.). Settlements and Necropoleis of the Black Sea and its Hinterland in Antiquity. Archaeopress. pp. 244–257. ISBN 978-1-78969-206-8.
- Türkiye Today Newsroom (6 September 2024). "2,600-year-old Medo-Persian fire altar unearthed in Türkiye's Oluz Hoyuk". Türkiye Today.
