= Van Fortress =

Massive stone fortification in Turkey

- Van, Turkey
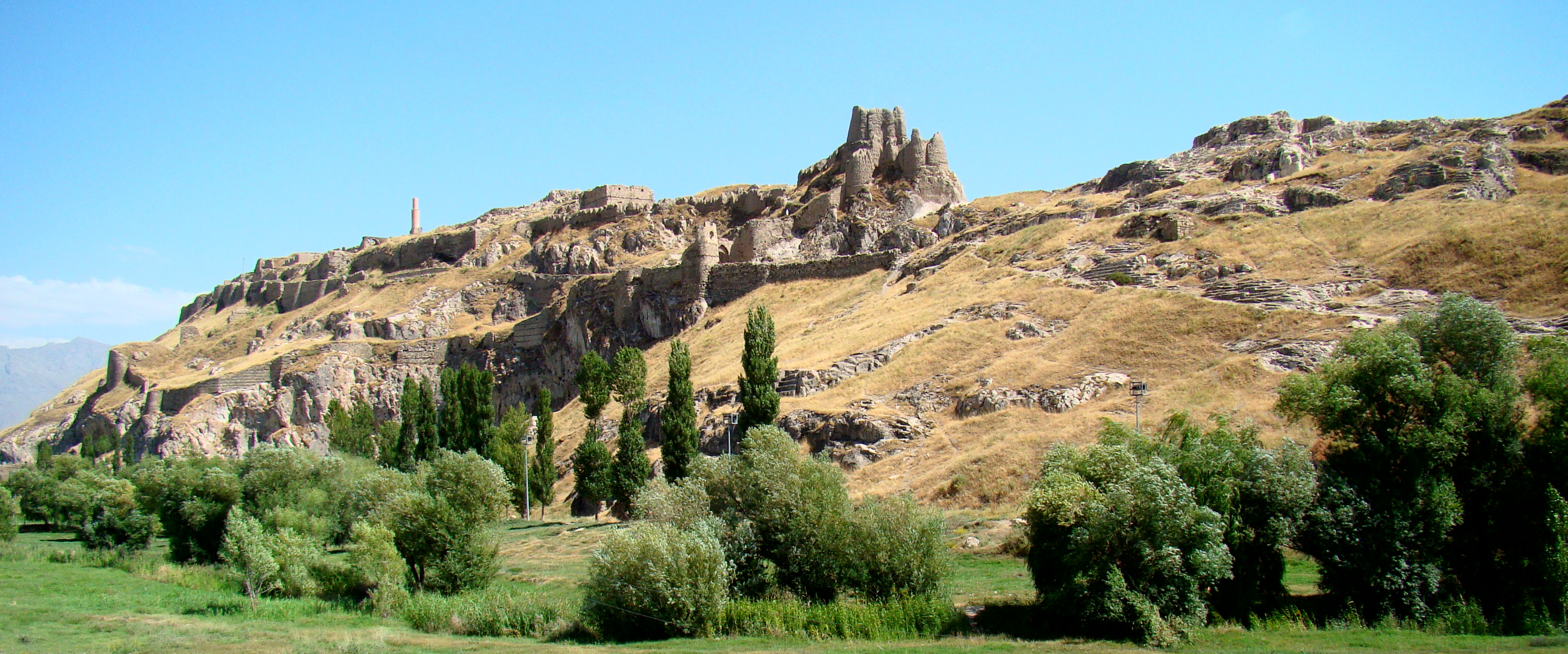
- Van Fortress as seen from the northwest

Site information
- Type: Fortress
- Open to the public: Yes
- Condition: Large sections of walls are still standing.

Location
- Shown within Turkey Van Fortress (Near East)
- Coordinates: 38°30′09″N 43°20′24″E

Site history
- Built: 8th and 7th centuries BC
- Materials: Unmortared basalt (lower walls) and mud-bricks
- Demolished: Partially

The Fortress of Van (also known as Van Citadel; Turkish: Van Kalesi; Armenian: Վանի Բերդ; Kurdish: Kela Wanê) is a massive stone fortification built by the ancient kingdom of Urartu during the 9th to 7th centuries BC, and is the largest example of its kind. It overlooks the ruins of Tushpa, the ancient Urartian capital during the 9th century, which was centered upon the steep-sided bluff where the fortress now sits. A number of similar fortifications were built throughout the Urartian kingdom, usually cut into hillsides and outcrops in places where modern-day Armenia, Turkey and Iran meet. Successive groups such as the Medes, Achaemenids, Armenians, Parthians, Romans, Sassanid Persians, Byzantines, Arabs, Seljuks, Safavids, Afsharids, Ottomans and Russians each controlled the fortress at one time or another. The ancient fortress is located just west of Van and east of Lake Van in the Van Province of Turkey.

Silva Tipple New Lake led an American expedition to the ruins in 1938–40. Most of the finds and field records from this were lost in the sinking of the S.S. Athenia in 1940.

The lower parts of the walls of Van Citadel were constructed of unmortared basalt, while the rest was built from mud bricks.

Such fortresses were used for regional control, rather than as a defense against foreign armies. The ruins of this fortress sit outside the modern city of Van, where they support walls built in the medieval era.

== The "Royal Stable" ==
At the Van Citadel, there is a "royal stable" (Siršini) of the dimensions of 20 m length, 9 m width and 2,5 m height, carved in rock. Oxen and sheep were held here to be sacrificed for the Urartian gods, according to the inscriptions discovered at the location.

== Achaemenid inscription ==
A stereotyped trilingual inscription of Xerxes the Great from the 5th century BC is inscribed upon a smoothed section of the rock face, some 20 meters (60 feet) above the ground near the fortress. The niche was originally carved out by Xerxes' father, King Darius, but left the surface blank. The inscription survives in near perfect condition and is divided into three columns of 27 lines written in (from left to right) Old Persian, Elamite, and Babylonian.

== Gallery ==
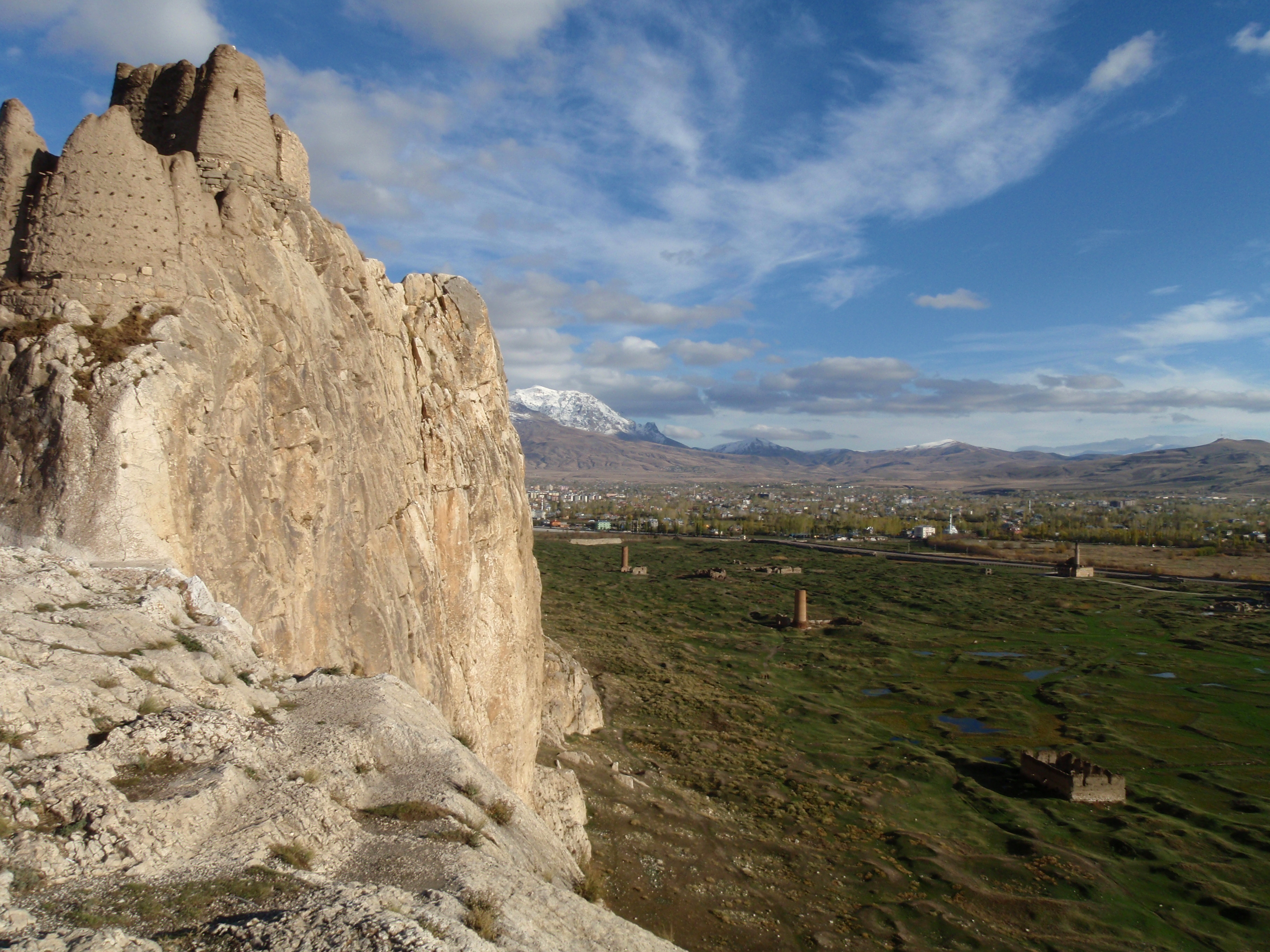
Citadel with the ruins of the city of Tushpa below

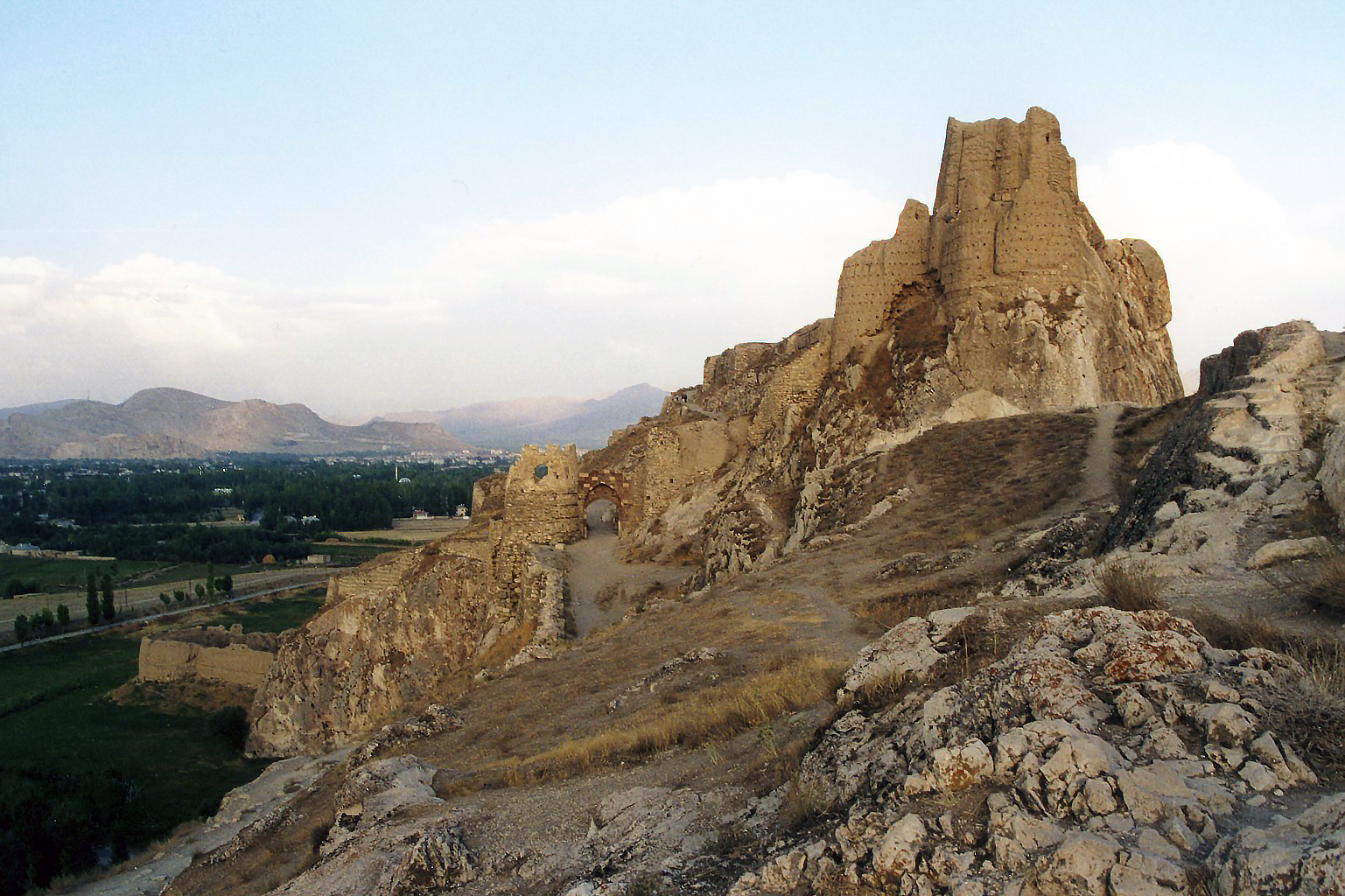
Van Fortress

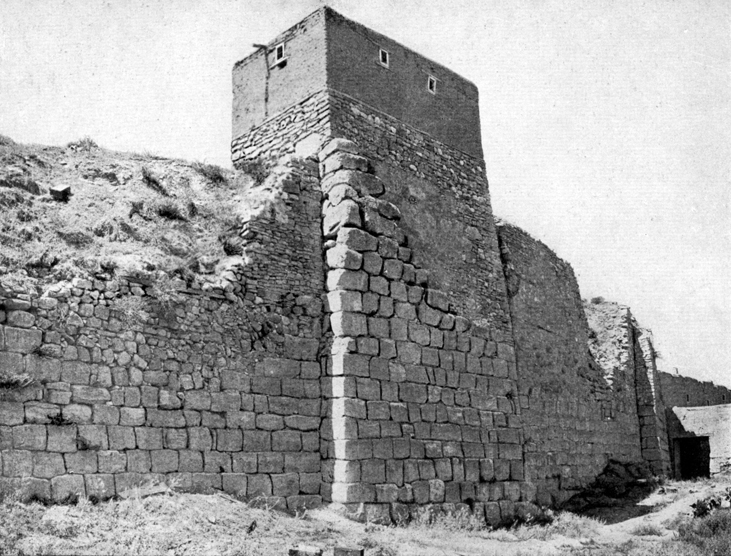
The walls of the fortress (Russian Archeological Society, 1916)

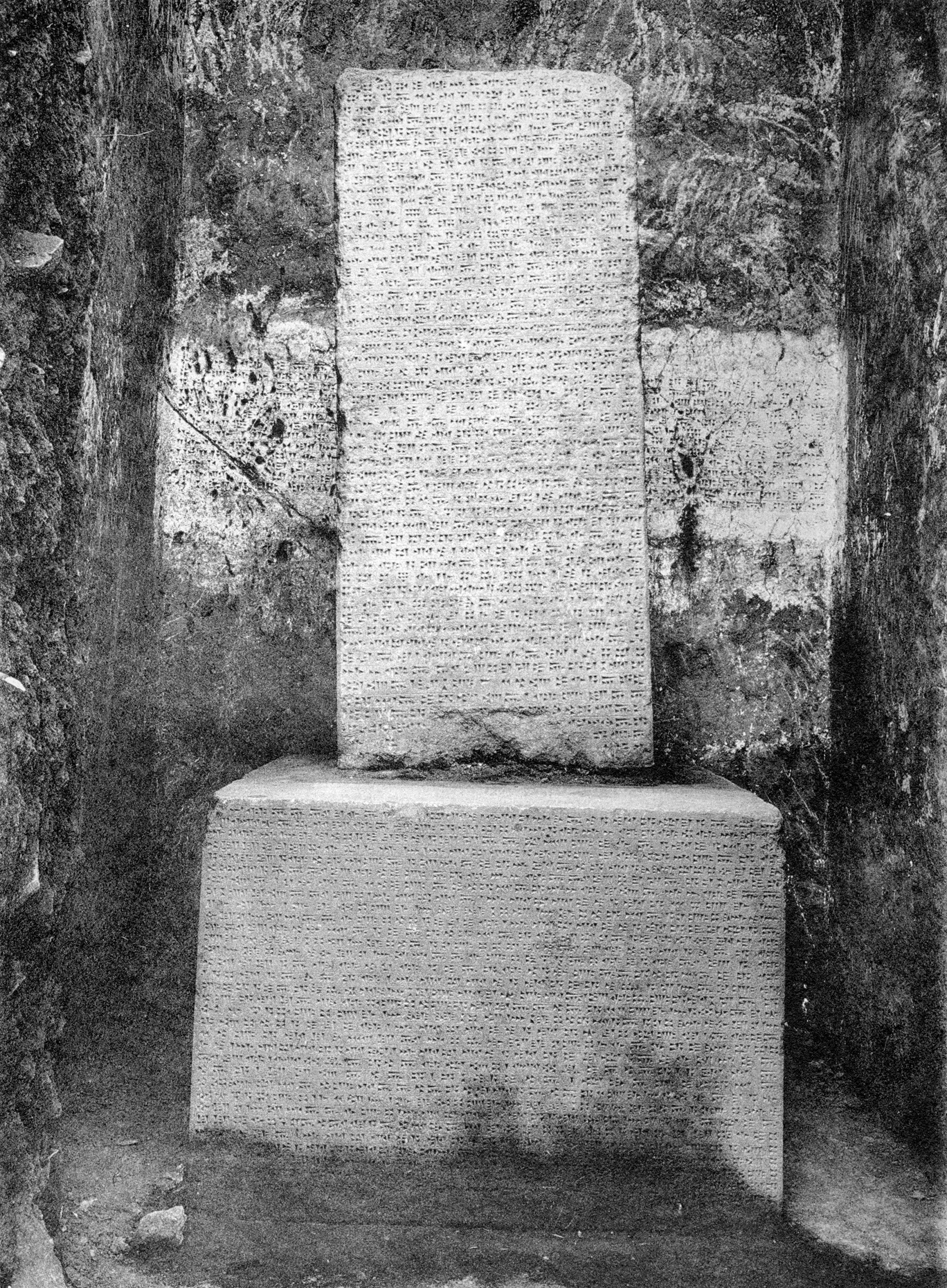
Annals of Sarduri (1915)

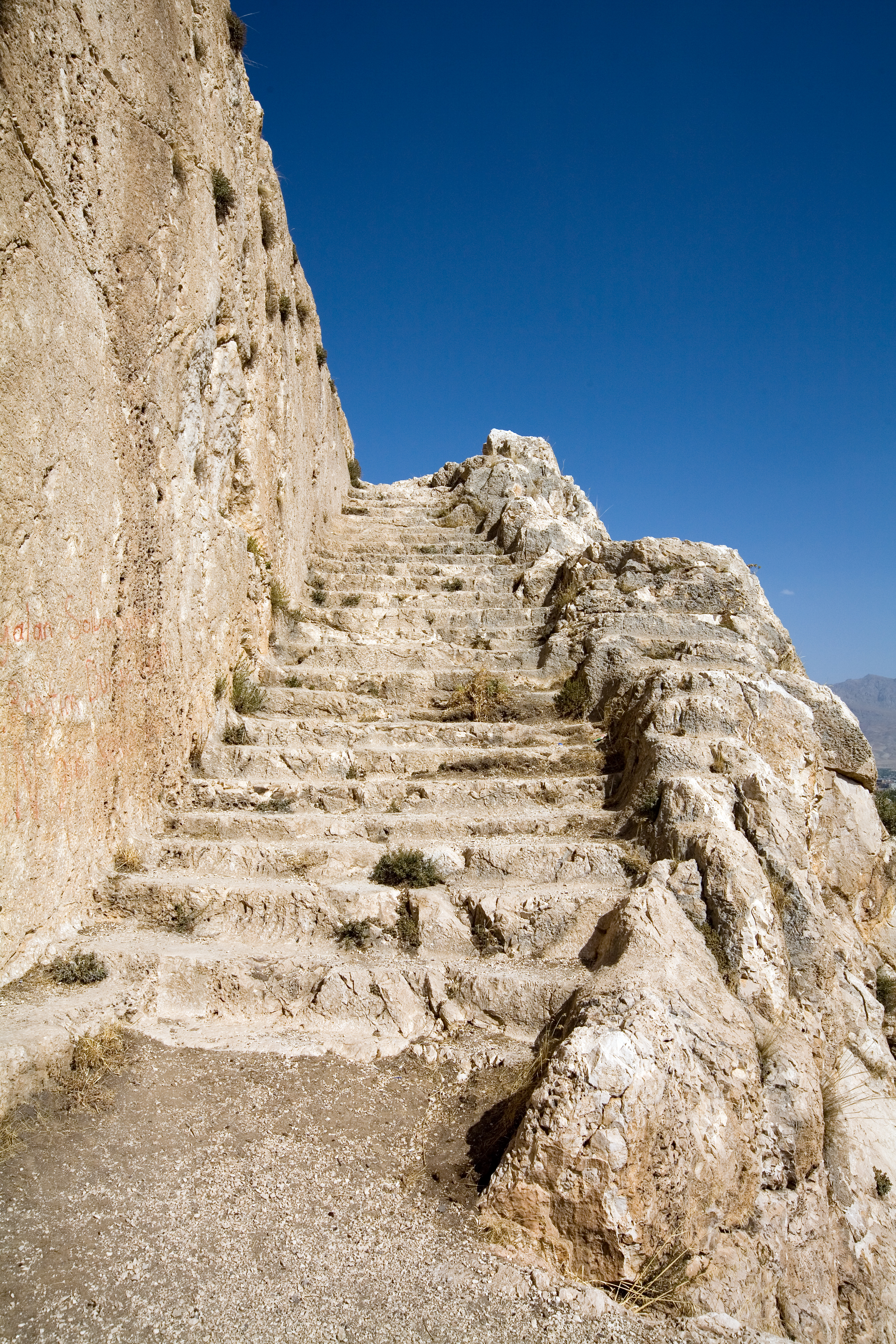
Stairs at the fortress

Xerxes I's inscription near the Van Citadel
