= Elspeth Dusinberre =

Elspeth Rogers McIntosh Dusinberre (born 1967 or 1968) is Professor of Distinction and President's Teaching Scholar in Classics at the University of Colorado Boulder. She focuses on cultural interactions in Anatolia, with an emphasis on the history of the Achaemenid Empire in Anatolia. She received her AB (summa cum laude) in 1991 from Harvard University and her PhD in 1997 from the University of Michigan (Dissertation: "Satrapal Sardis: Aspects of Empire in an Achaemenid Capital"). Dusinberre has received 12 University of Colorado teaching awards and been awarded the Wiseman Award by the Archaeological Institute of America for her 2013 publication, Empire, Authority, and Autonomy in Achaemenid Anatolia.

In 2018, she was named Distinguished Research Lecturer at the University of Colorado Boulder. Most recently, her work has focused on the seal impressions on the Persepolis Fortification Archive and on the archaeological site of Gordion, capital of ancient Phrygia, in Turkey.

== Selected publications ==
- Aspects of Empire in Achaemenid Sardis (Cambridge 2003)
- Gordion Seals and Sealings: Individuals and Society (Philadelphia 2005)
- 2010 “Lydo-Persian Seals from Sardis” and “Ivories from Lydia.” in: The Lydians and Their World, edited by N. D. Cahill, 177-190, 191-200. Istanbul: Yapı Kredi Yayınları.
- Empire, Authority, and Autonomy in Achaemenid Anatolia (Cambridge 2013)
- A Mid-6th-Century b.c.e. Deposit from Gordion in Central Anatolia: Evidence for Feasting and the Persian Destruction, with Kathleen M. Lynch and Mary M. Voigt (Chicago 2019)
- The Art of Empire in Achaemenid Persia: Studies in Honor of Margaret Cool Root (E. R. M. Dusinberre, M. B. Garrison, and W. F. M. Henkelman eds.) (Leiden: Nederlands Instituut voor het Nabije Oosten, 2020)
