= National Museum of India =

Museum in New Delhi, India

National Museum, New Delhi

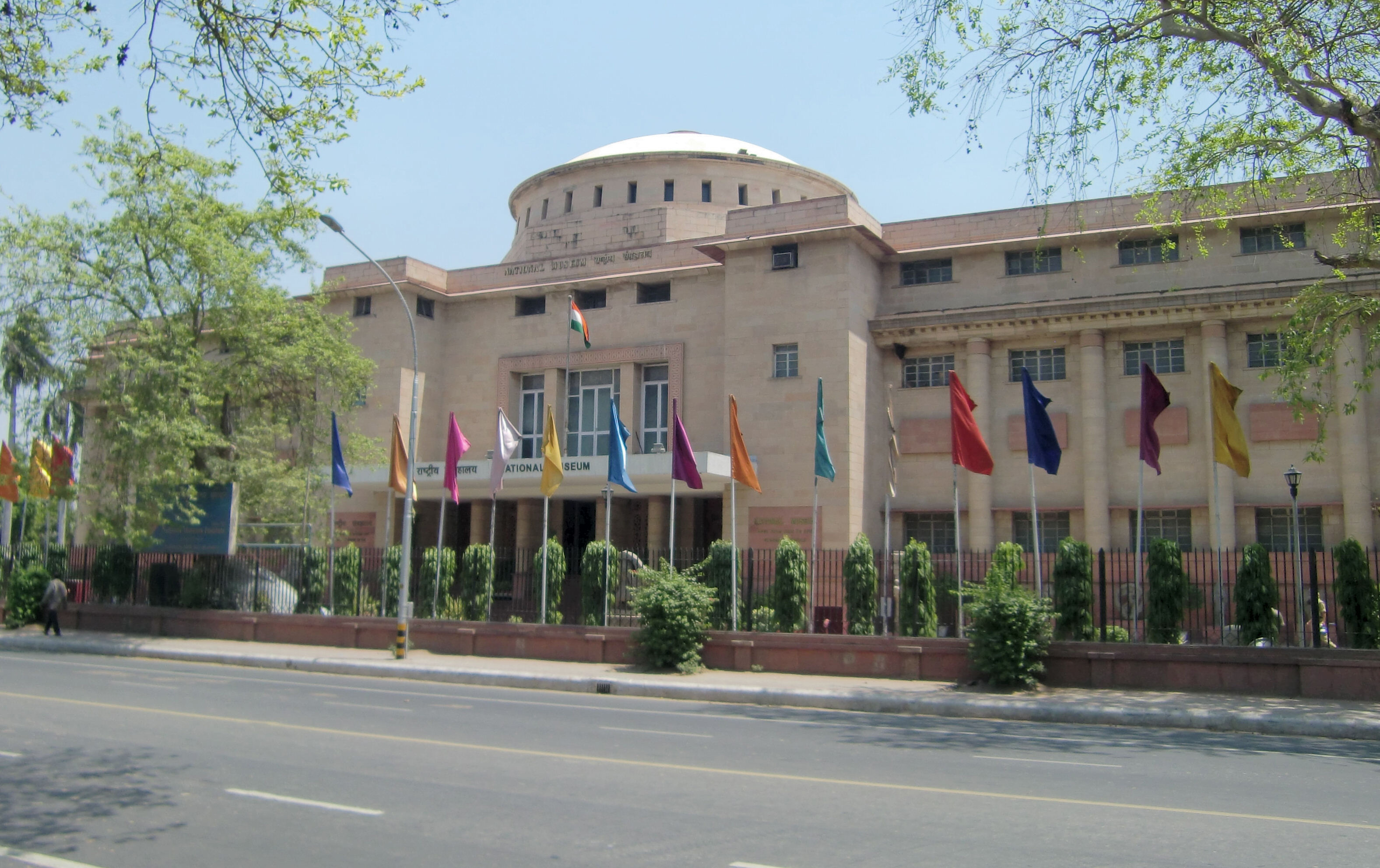
- The front view of National Museum New Delhi India in 2009

- Location within Delhi
- Interactive fullscreen map
- Established: 15 August 1949; 77 years ago
- Location: Janpath, New Delhi, India
- Coordinates: 28°36′43″N 77°13′09″E
- Key holdings: List: Dancing Girl (sculpture); Ivory Carved Dashavtar; Ivory carved tusk depicting Buddha life stories; Jade collection; Some of the Akota Bronzes; Carved wood vahanas
- Collection size: 206,000 objects
- CEO: Shri Rajpal Singh hemti
- Architect: Ganesh Bikaji Deolalikar
- Owner: Indian Government
- Public transit access: Udyog Bhawan
- Website: nationalmuseumindia.gov.in

The National Museum, New Delhi, also known as the National Museum of India, is one of the largest museums in India. Established in 1949, it holds a variety of articles ranging from the pre-historic era to modern works of art. It functions under the Ministry of Culture, Government of India. The museum is situated on Janpath. The blueprint of the National Museum had been prepared by the Gwyer Committee set up by the Government of India in 1946. The museum has around 200,000 works of art, mostly Indian, but some of foreign origin, covering over 5,000 years.

It also houses the National Museum Institute of History of Art, Conservation and Museology on the first floor which was established in 1983 and has been a university since 1989, running master's and doctoral level courses in art history, conservation and museology.

== History ==
In 1946, the idea of building a National Museum for India was proposed by the Gwyer Committee. Sir Maurice Gwyer, the former chief justice of India and vice chancellor of Delhi University, headed the committee. One of the members of the committee was Sir Mortimer Wheeler, then heading the Archaeological Survey of India (ASI), who is often cited as chief initiators of the National Museum as he advocated for the museum's development although reports indicate that he was concerned with unifying ASI site museums under the umbrella of a museum's branch rather than setting up a new museum. Sir Sobha Singh had contracted the project.

The roots of the National Museum begin with an exhibition of Indian art and artefacts organized by the Royal Academy of Arts, London. The exhibition went on display in the galleries of Burlington House during the winter months of 1947–48. This Exhibition of The Art of India and Pakistan in London was arguably the first exhibition sponsored by the British government which gave Indian artefacts the status of high art. Before its return to India, with Jawaharlal Nehru's support, it was decided that these important collections should be showcased here upon their return so that they could be enjoyed and appreciated by the people of India. At the close of the exhibit, requests were released to the loaning museums and collectors, urging them to surrender object ownership to what was to become the National Museum. When the decision was taken to make a permanent National Museum, the exhibits were first displayed in the state rooms of the Rashtrapati Bhavan (then called Government House) on 15 August 1949, and the rooms were formally inaugurated by C. Rajgopalachari, Governor General of India. Until the mid-1950s, it essentially remained a permanent version of the temporary exhibit – consisting of the same pieces, and remaining in the state rooms. In 1955 building began on the new current location of the National Museum at Janpath. However, when the National Museum was ready in 1960, the statue of Buddha and the Rampurva Bull were retained at the Rashtrapati Bhavan on the request of Jawaharlal Nehru.

Since its inception, the National Museum owed much of its original structure and organization to the example of the Indian Museum, Kolkata, as some of its first curators were former employees of the Indian Museum, such as C. Sivaramamurti, even though the National Museum aspired to displace the historic position the Indian Museum had come to acquire as the largest and grandest museum in India. The National Museum encouraged scholars and the public to think differently about the objects on display by placing the objects within a broad historical context and allowing the objects to speak for a larger representation outside of itself.

Grace Morley was the first director of the National Museum, New Delhi, who earlier played an instrumental role as the founding director (1935–58) of the San Francisco Museum of Art (now San Francisco Museum of Modern Art). She joined the National Museum on 8 August 1960 and continued to hold its charge for six more years. She was one of the advocates of cultural democracy who believed that art should be available to everyone—and held firm convictions about the crucial role that museums could play in this endeavour. In her installations for the National Museum, this desire for secularisation and democratisation was effected through the presentation of sculptures in classic white-cube spaces with minimal contextual information. It was her 'visual storage' display system, minimalist teak pedestals, air-conditioning vents, track-lighting, and large glass cases with staggered risers for visual variety which led to the museum acquiring international recognition and the museum in its working still reflects her image. She instructed carpenters to build display cases and Eamesian-type couches, cabinets and cases that reflected modernist, uncluttered lines. Such elements produced the perfect streamlined stage for a performance of the modern by viewing audiences. Harmonious colour schemes, dramatic, dim lighting, cushions of space around eye-level objects, and the occasional leafy plant for a visual pause, all contributed to the creation of a modern museum.

== Departments and collections ==
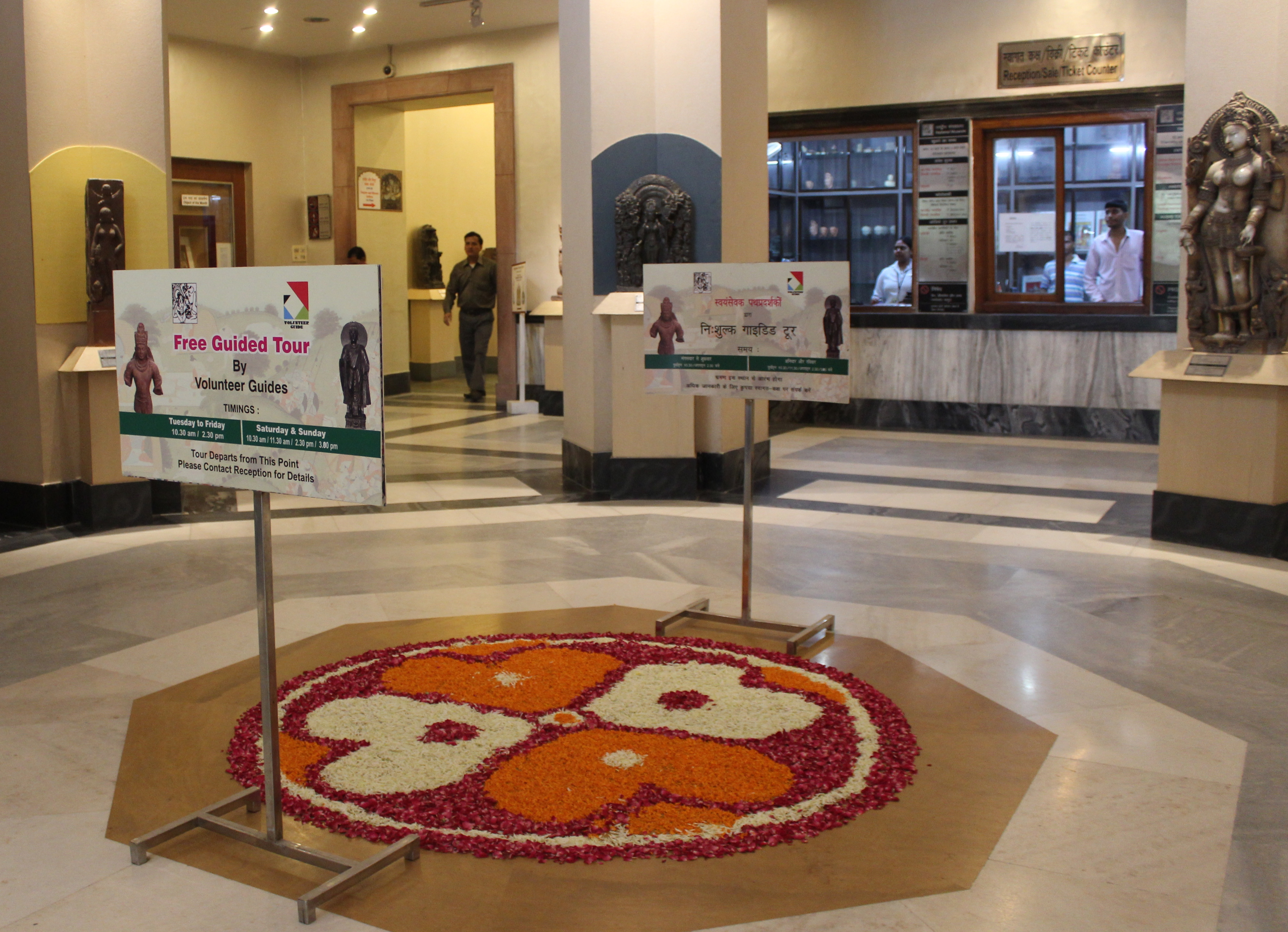
Reception of the museum

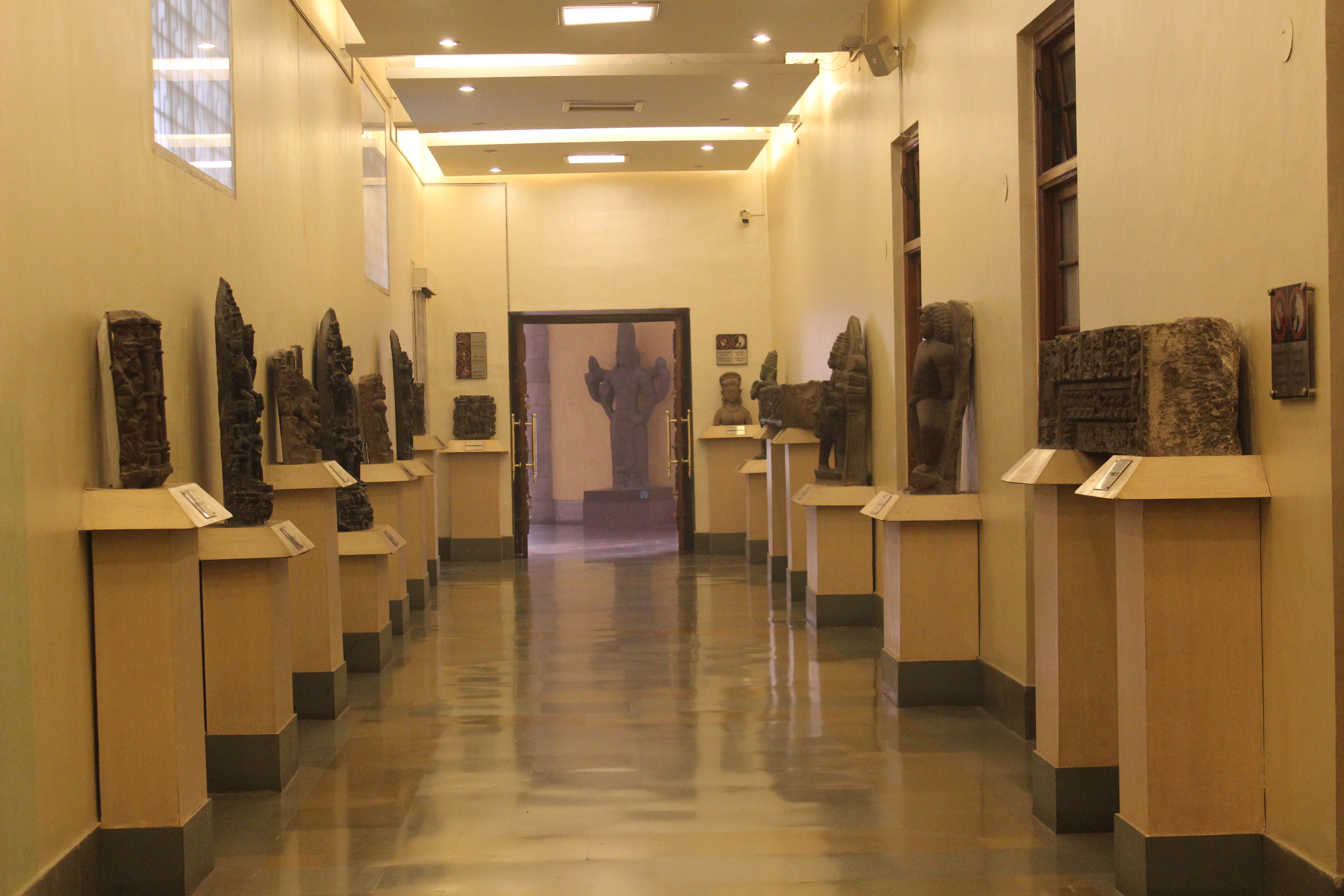
The entrance corridor of the National Museum, housing artefacts on both sides

Presently, there are several departments in the National Museum.

- Pre-History Archaeology
- Archaeology
- Manuscripts
- Numismatics & Epigraphy
- Paintings
- Arms & Armour
- Decorative Arts
- Central Asian Antiquities
- Pre-Columbian Art
- Jewellery
- Anthropology
- Anubhav
- Education
- Public Relations
- Publication
- Conservation
- Display

The collections of the National Museum represent almost all disciplines of art: archaeology (sculptures in stone, bronze and terracotta), arms, armour, decorative arts, jewellery, manuscripts, miniatures and Tanjore paintings, textiles, numismatics, epigraphy, Central Asian antiquities, anthropology, Pre-Columbian American and Western Art Collections.

The museum has in its possession over 200,000 works of art, of both Indian and foreign origin. While the National Museum has over 200,000 exhibits, it currently displays six to seven percent of its collection. The remaining is exhibited on a rotational basis or in temporary exhibitions. The final phase of expansion will allow it to display another three to four percent of the treasures.

== Building ==
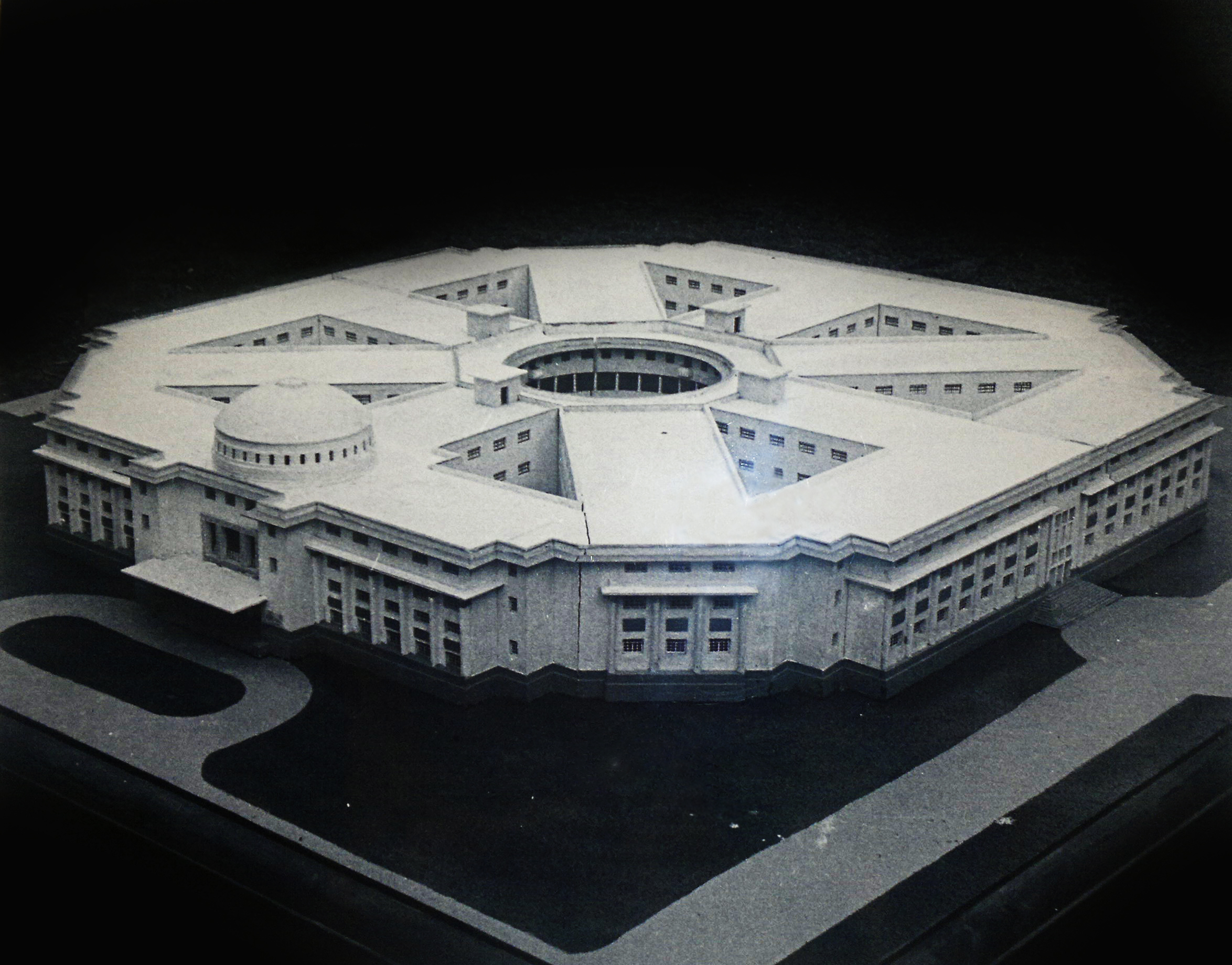
National Museum, building plan outlay

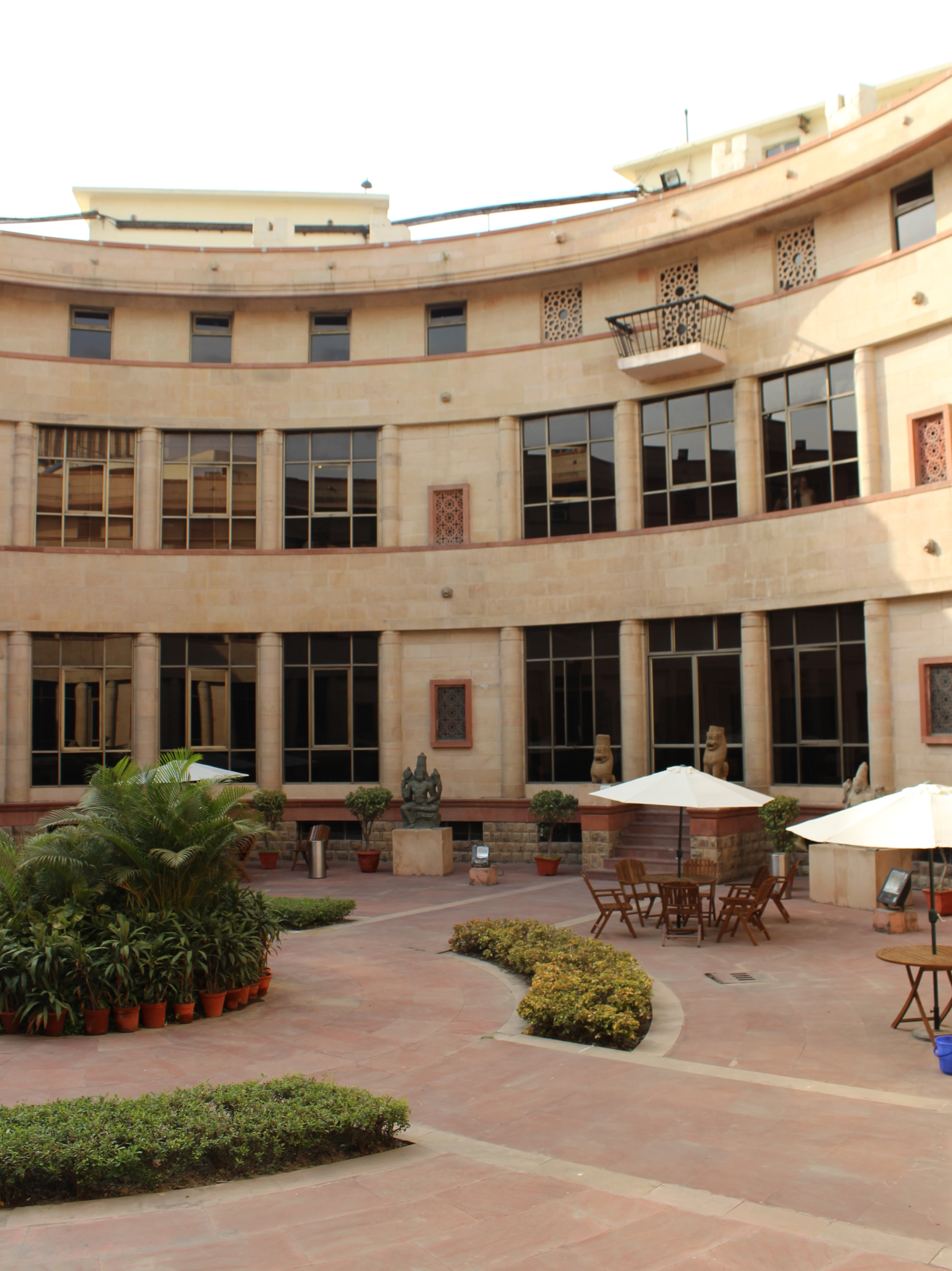
Inside view of the Museum Building

The current building of the National Museum was designed by the architect Ganesh Bikaji Deolalikar, and the foundation stone was laid by Prime Minister Jawaharlal Nehru on 12 May 1955. Once the building was ready, the new museum was inaugurated by Dr. Sarvepalli Radhakrishnan, Vice-President of India, on 18 December 1960. It stands today on the plot of land earmarked in Edwin L. Lutyens' plan for the Imperial Museum and was occupied by a small Museum of Central Asian Antiquities that housed the important collection of the explorer Sir Aurel Stein.

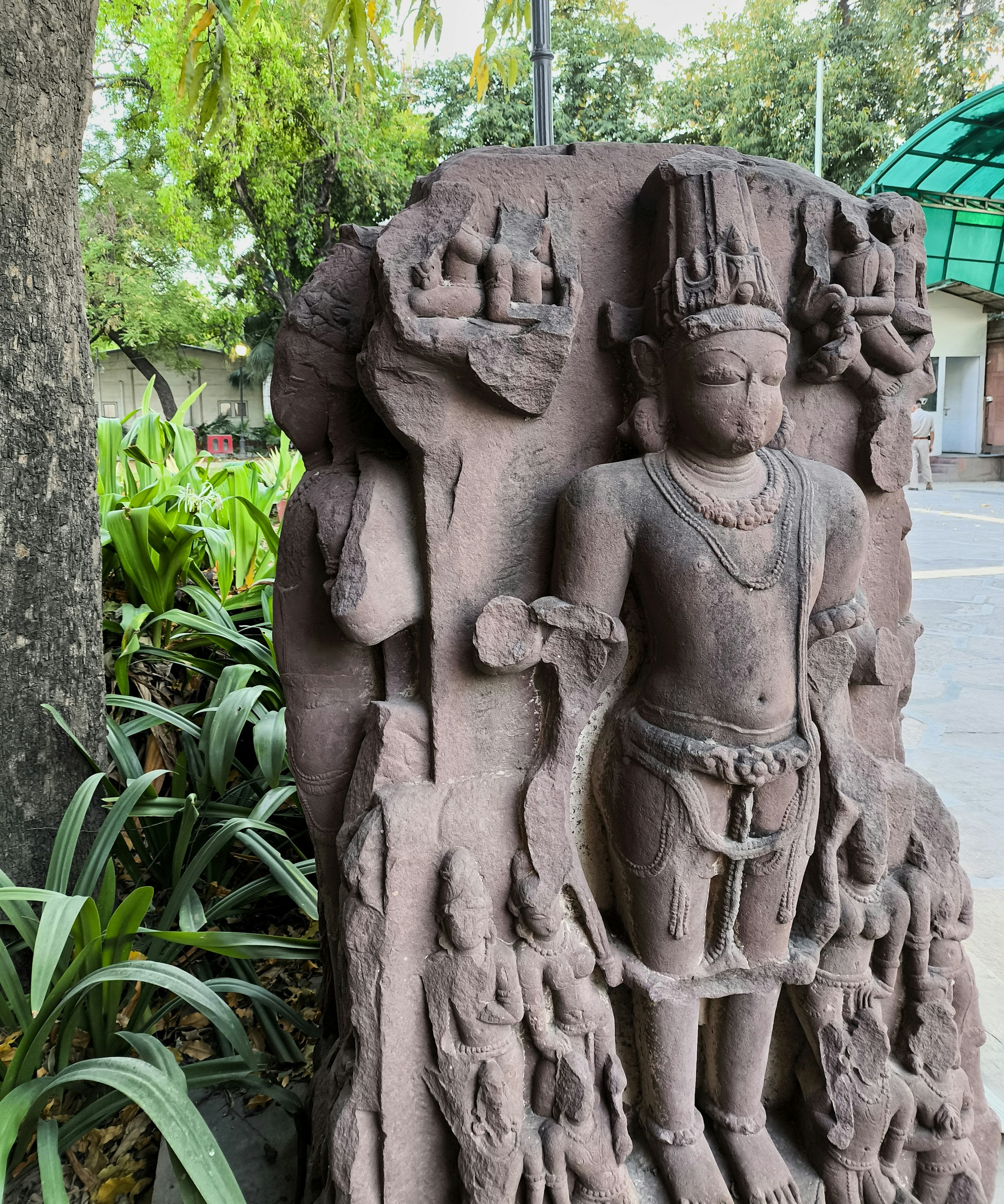
Sculpture beside a garden path at the National Museum in New Delhi.

The National Museum building was planned to be built in phases to finally give it an octagonal shape. Its first phase was inaugurated in 1960, and the second was completed in 1989. For the third and final phase, a foundation stone was laid on 18 December 2017, and involves the razing down of the Archaeological Survey of India (ASI) building which has been moved to Dharohar Bhawan. As maps of the original plan suggest, roughly a quarter portion remains to be added for the completion of the building. The National Museum building has three floors with galleries radiating from a central garden court. The National Museum Institute, which is on the first floor of the museum and has a "deemed to be university" status, will be shifting to a new campus in Noida.

== Collections ==
=== Harappan Gallery ===
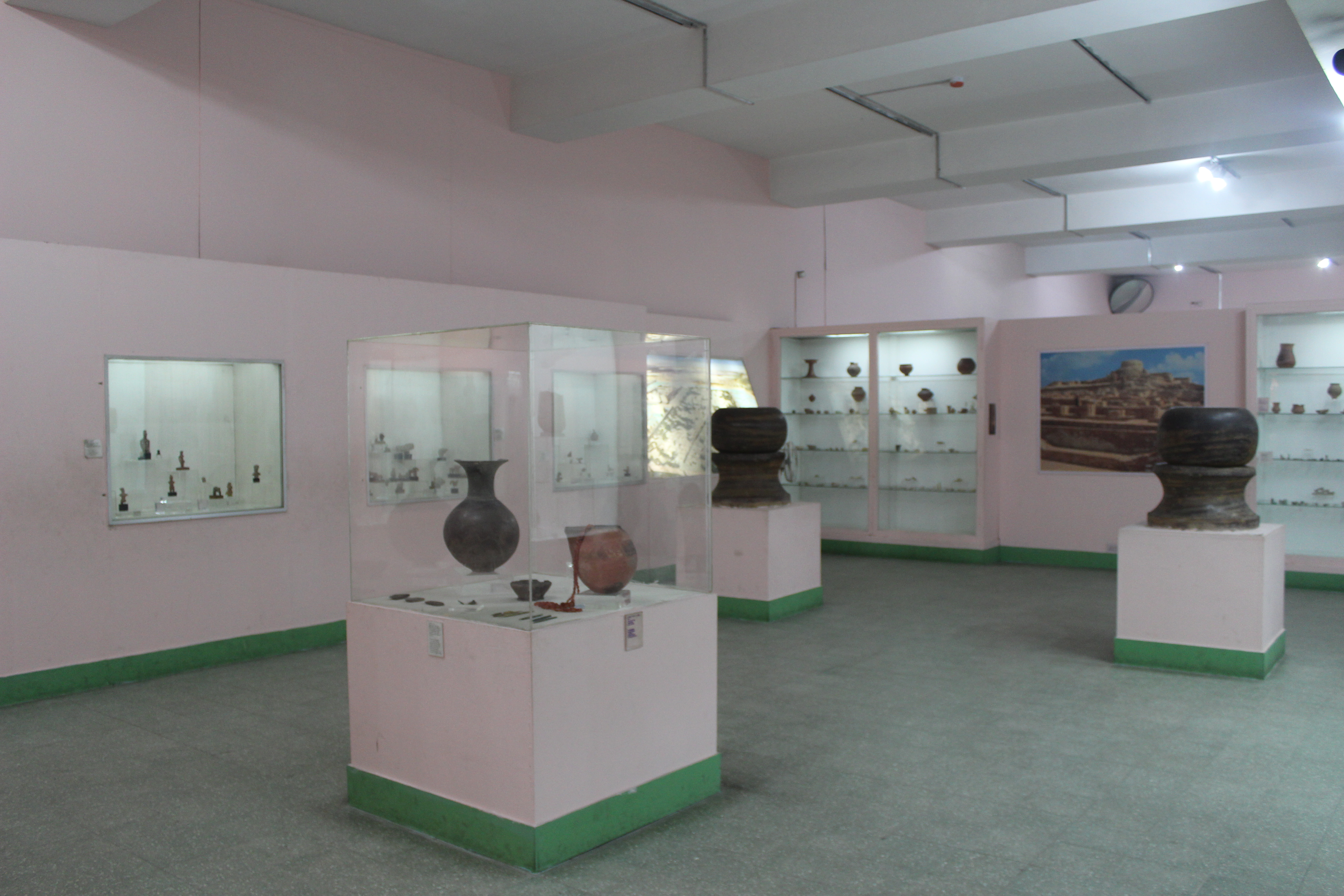
A view of the Harappan Gallery

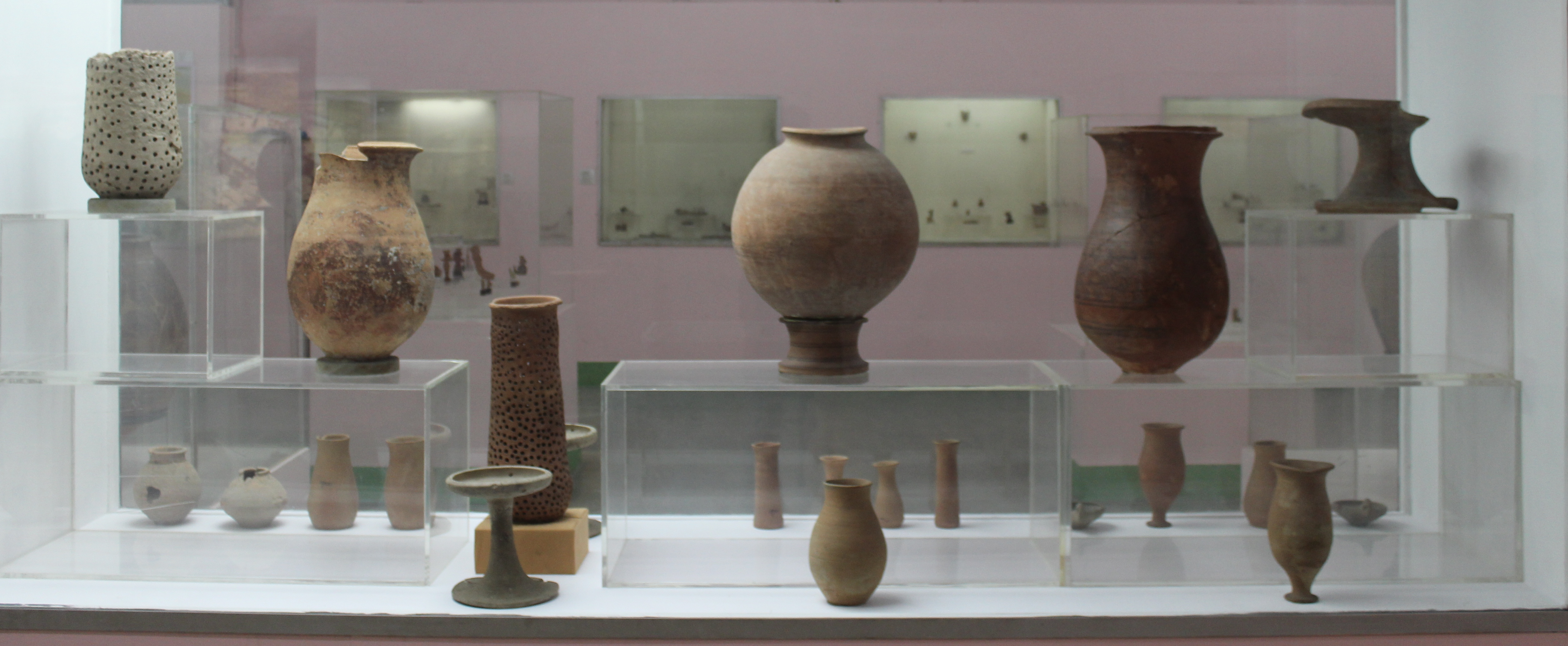
A view of the pottery from the Harappan gallery

The museum has various artefacts from the Harappan civilization, also known as the Indus Valley civilization. It has the world's most representative collection of antiquities of the Harappan civilization – over 3500 objects that are on permanent loan from the Archaeological Survey of India to the museum. Most famous among the objects is the Dancing Girl made in Bronze, which belongs to the early Harappan period, Skeleton excavated from Rakhigarhi in Haryana, Terracotta images of Mother Goddess and Clay Pottery. Apart from these the gallery has Sculptures in Bronzes & Terracotta, Bone Objects, Ivory, Steatite, Semi-Precious Stones, Painted Pottery and Jewellery items. Many seals are also on display which has been discovered during numerous excavations and were probably used for trading purposes. These seals depict bulls, elephants, unicorns, tigers, crocodiles, and unknown symbols. On one of the seals, there is the depiction of Pasupati that has been interpreted as proto-Shiva.

When one of the major sites of the Harappan civilization, Mohenjo Daro, was excavated in the 1920s, archaeologists deposited its important finds first in the Lahore Museum, and then these were moved to Delhi by Mortimer Wheeler in anticipation of the construction of a Central Imperial Museum there. At the time of the Partition, the issue of ownership of these objects arose and eventually the two countries agreed to share all the collections equally, although this was sometimes interpreted in literal sense, with several necklaces and girdles taken apart with half the beads sent to Pakistan and half retained in India. In the words of Nayanjot Lahiri, ‘the integrity of these objects were compromised in the name of equitable division’. Of the two most celebrated sculpted figures found in Mohenjo Daro, Pakistan asked for and received the steatite figure of a bearded male, dubbed the 'Priest King', while the National Museum of India retained the bronze statuette of the 'Dancing Girl', a nude bejeweled female. Considering that the major sites like Mohenjo Daro and Harappa belonged to Pakistan post-Partition, the collections in this gallery also grew out of the discoveries of the excavations made after the Indian independence in 1947 such as Daimabad, Rakhigarhi, and Dholavira.

Key highlights of the collection include:

- Mother Goddess (2700–2100 BC)
- Toy Cart (2700–2100 BC)
- Bull (2700–2100 BC)
- Pasupati Seal (2700–2100 BC)
- Climbing Monkey (2700–2100 BC)
- Dancing Girl (2700–2100 BC)

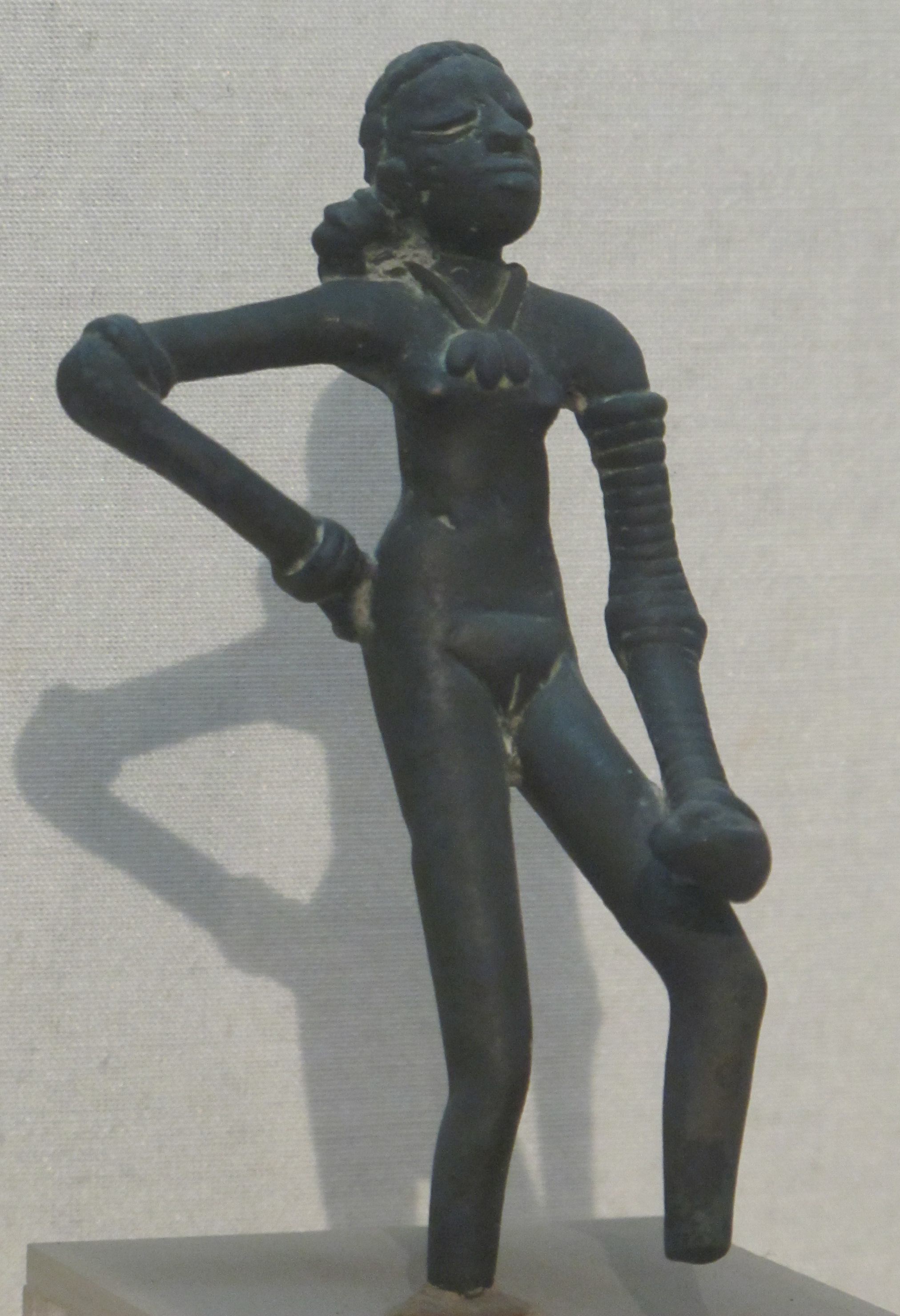
Dancing Girl

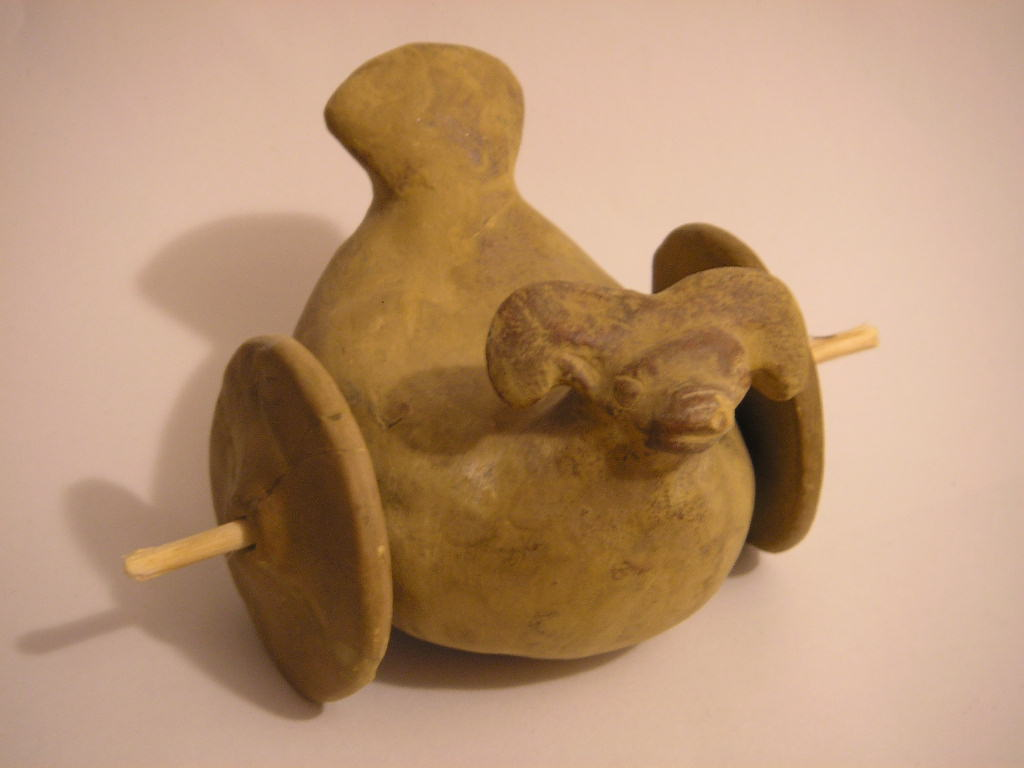
Toy cart from Mohenjo-daro

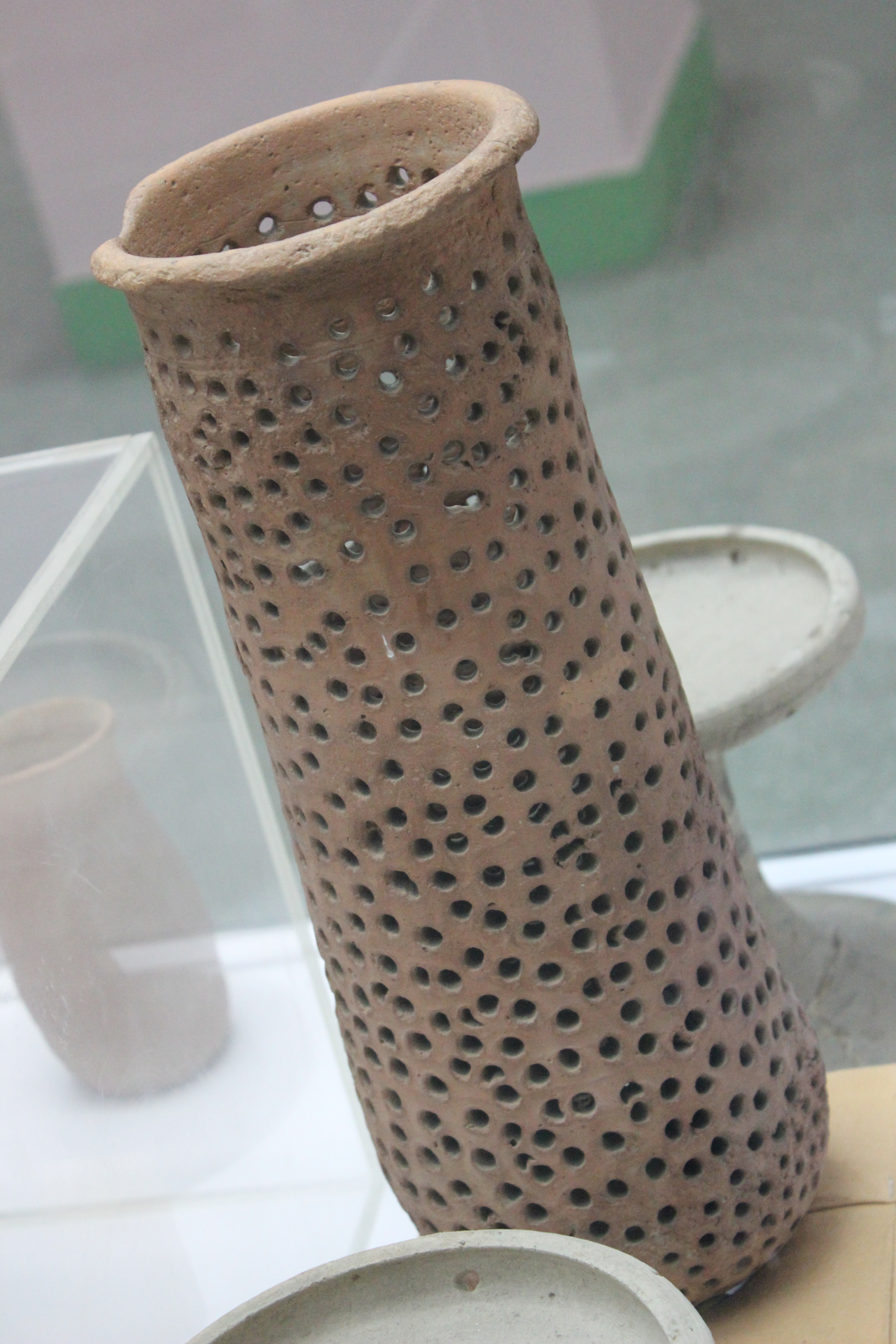
Perforated Jar

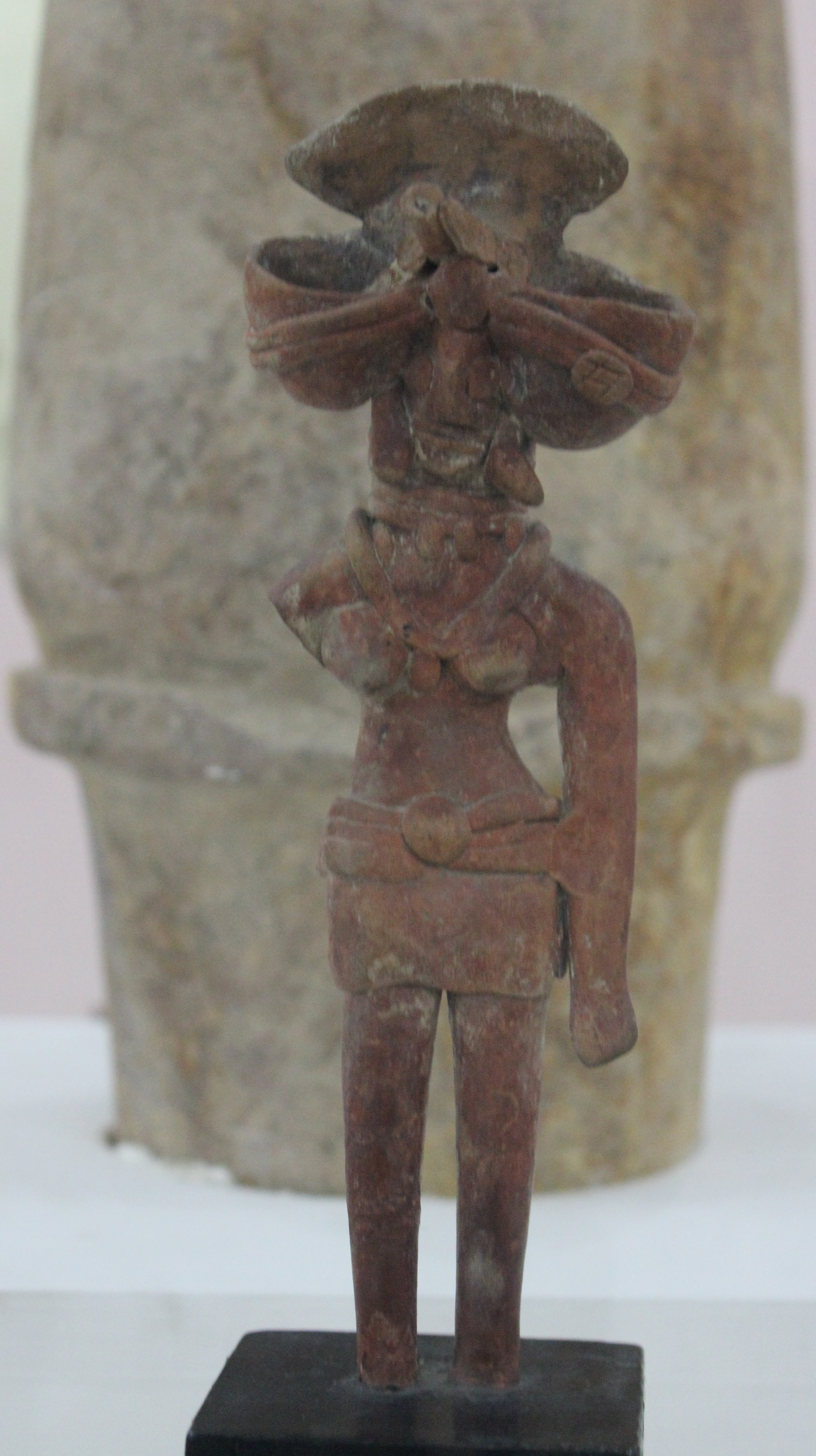
Mother Goddess

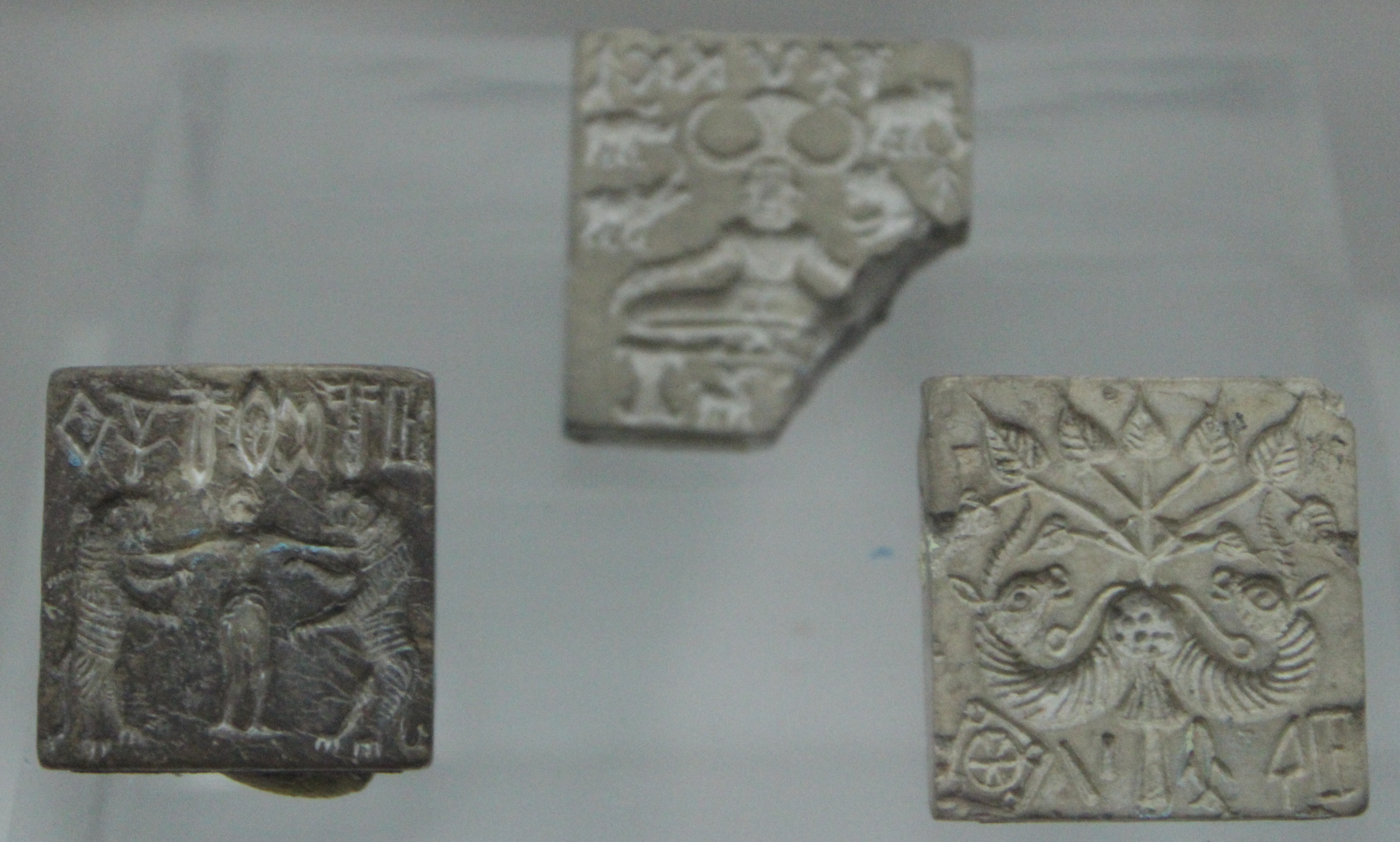
Seals

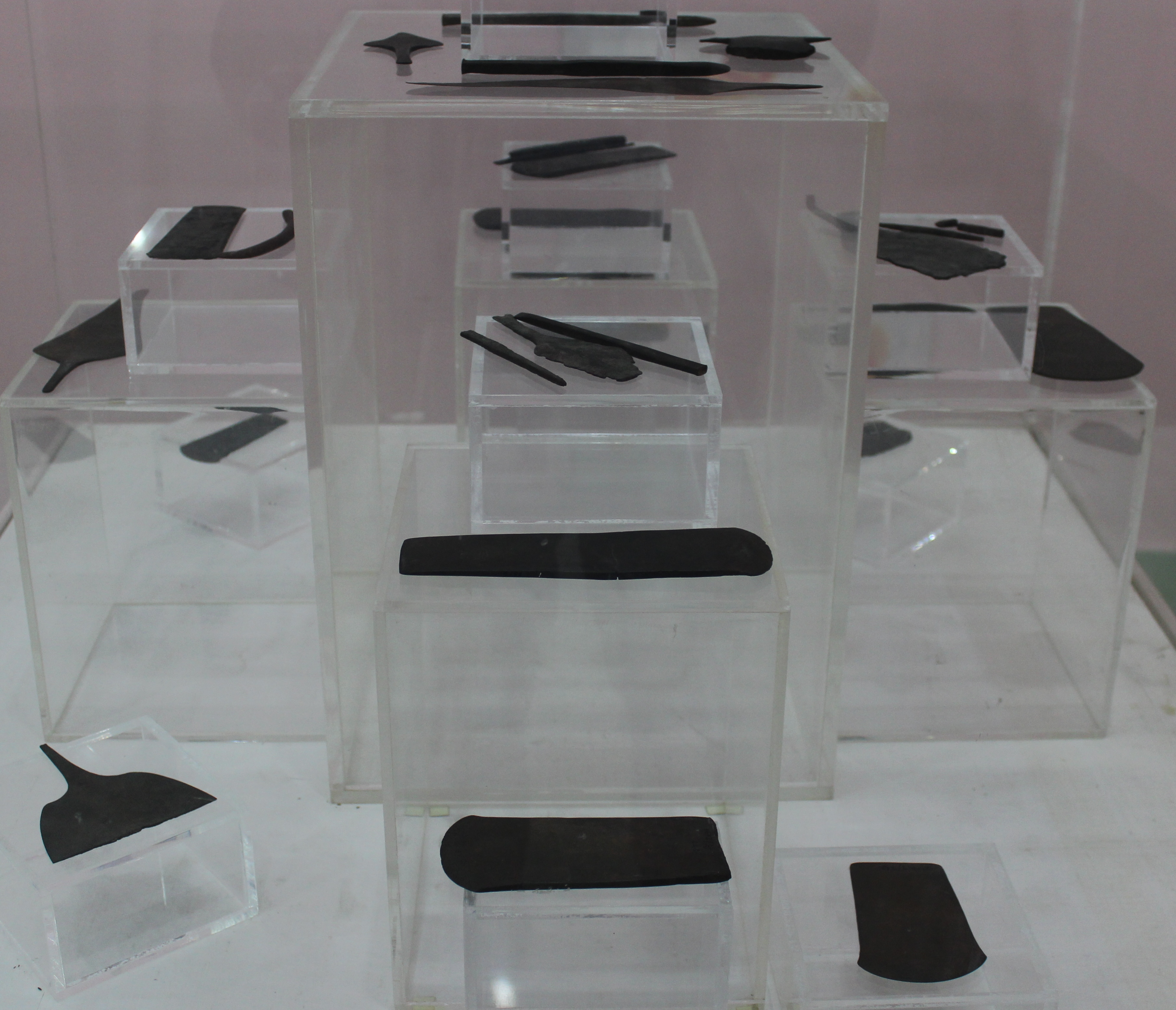
Arms from Harappan Civilization

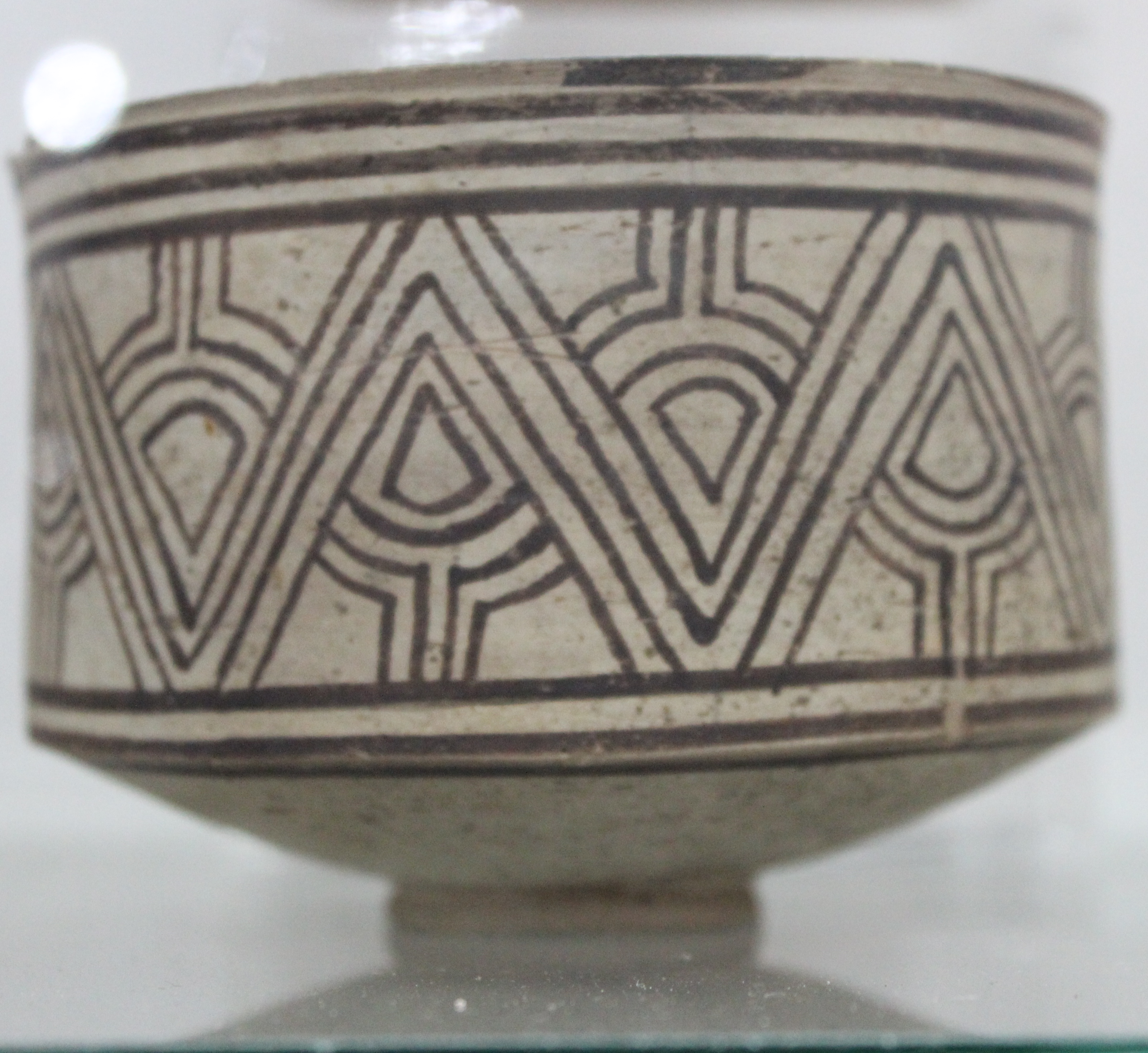
Bowl

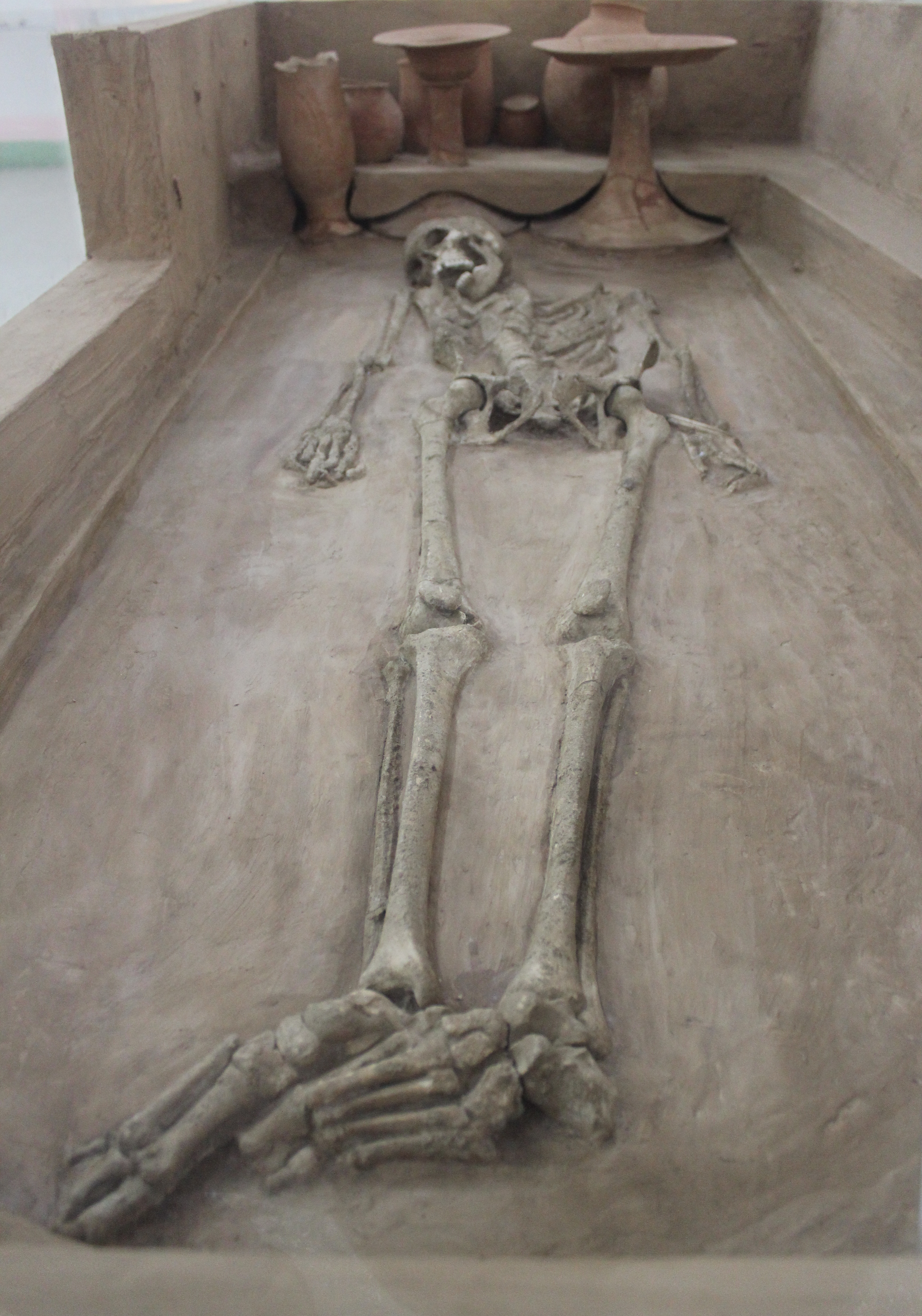
One of 11 skeletons found from Rakhigarhi

=== Maurya, Shunga and Satvahana Arts Gallery ===
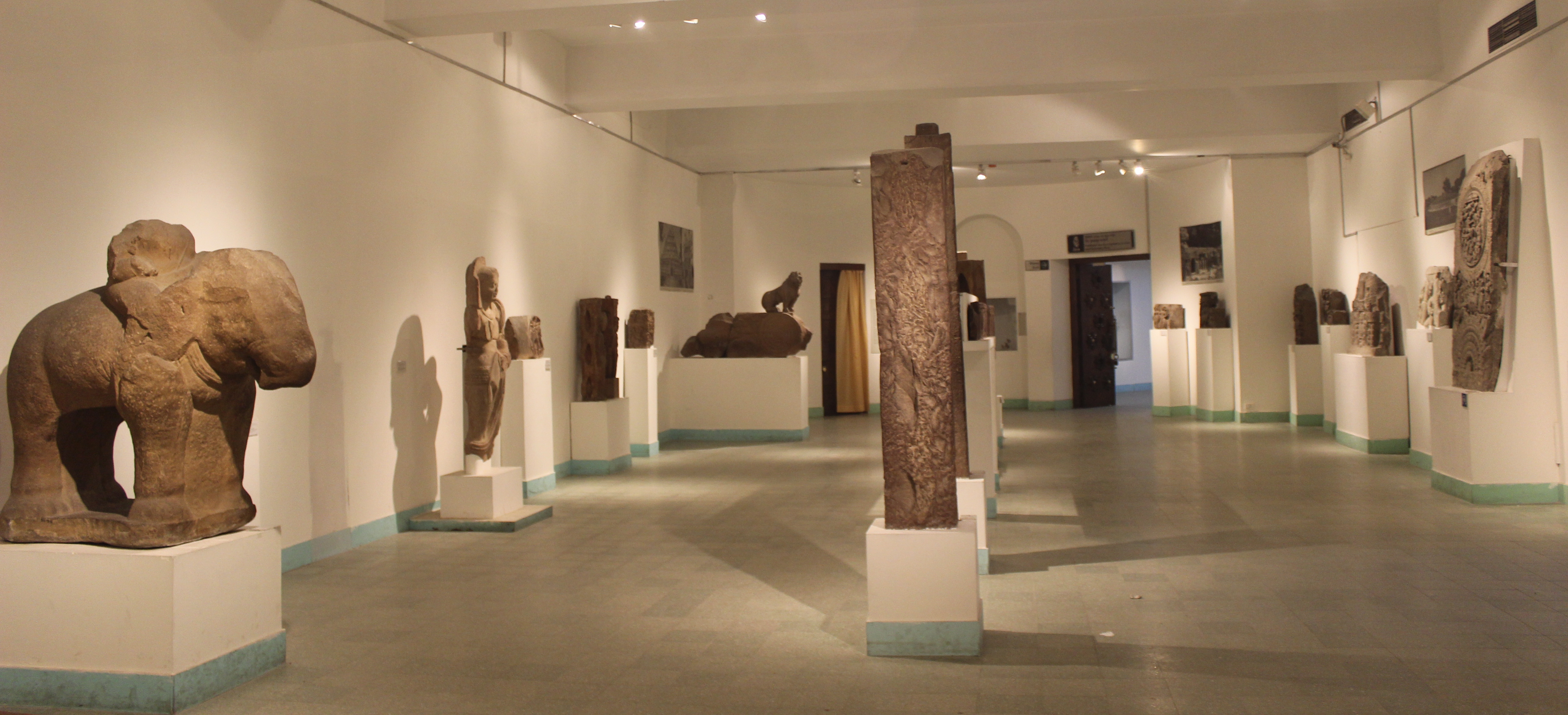
Maurya, Shunga and Satvahana Arts Gallery artefacts

The gallery has objects from the 4th century BCE to the 1st century BCE. It has objects spanning three major dynasties: the Mauryas, the Shungas and the Satvahanas. Objects in the gallery have Greek influence characterized by mirror-like finishing. The gallery also houses fragments of railings from various ancient Stupas that are carved on with episodes from Buddha's life. A major object is the one showing Sage Asita's visit to baby Siddharta and the Bharhut railings that depicts the story related to the relics associated with Buddha by the sage Drona. A typical feature of the period to which objects in the gallery belongs to is that the sculptures do not depict Buddha in the physical form. He is always shown using symbols like the Dharmachakra, the Bodhi tree, empty throne, and footprints.

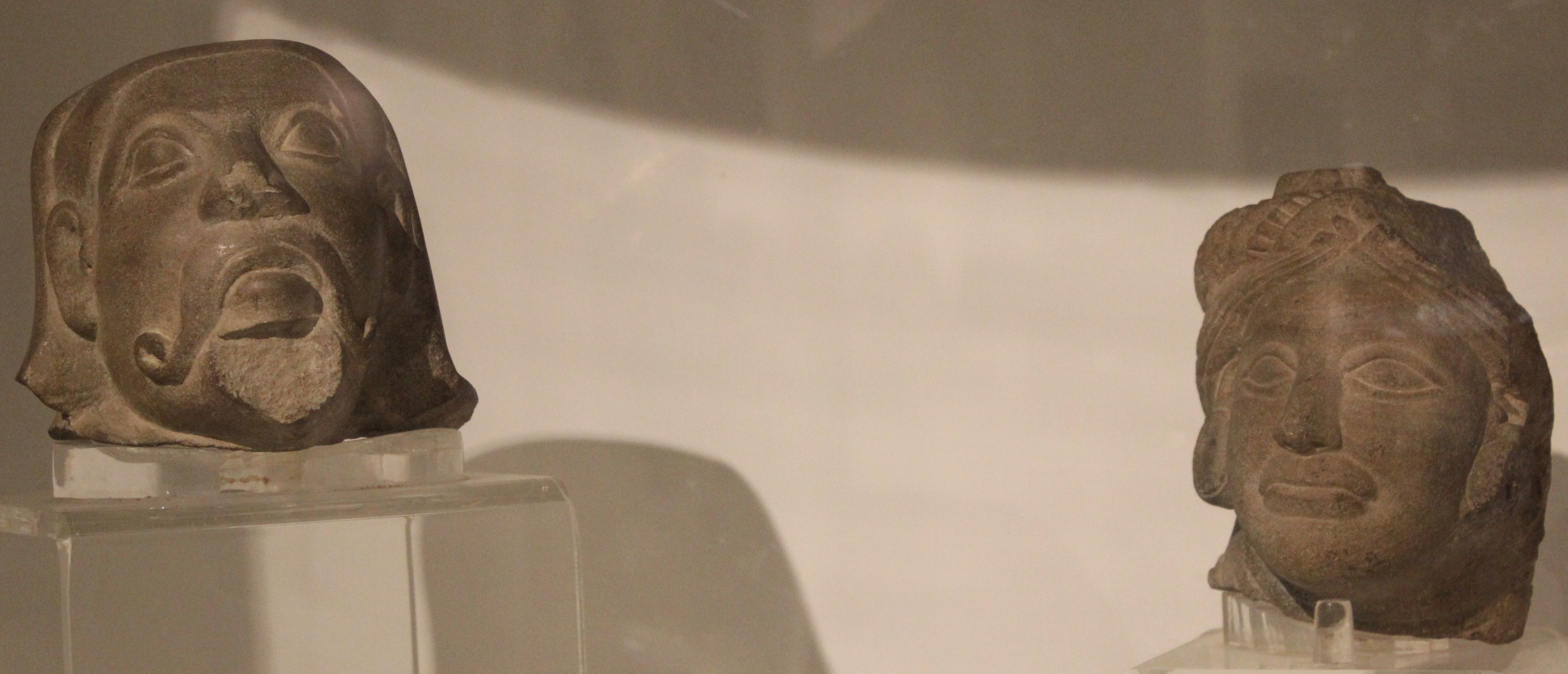
Male Heads (Maurya period)

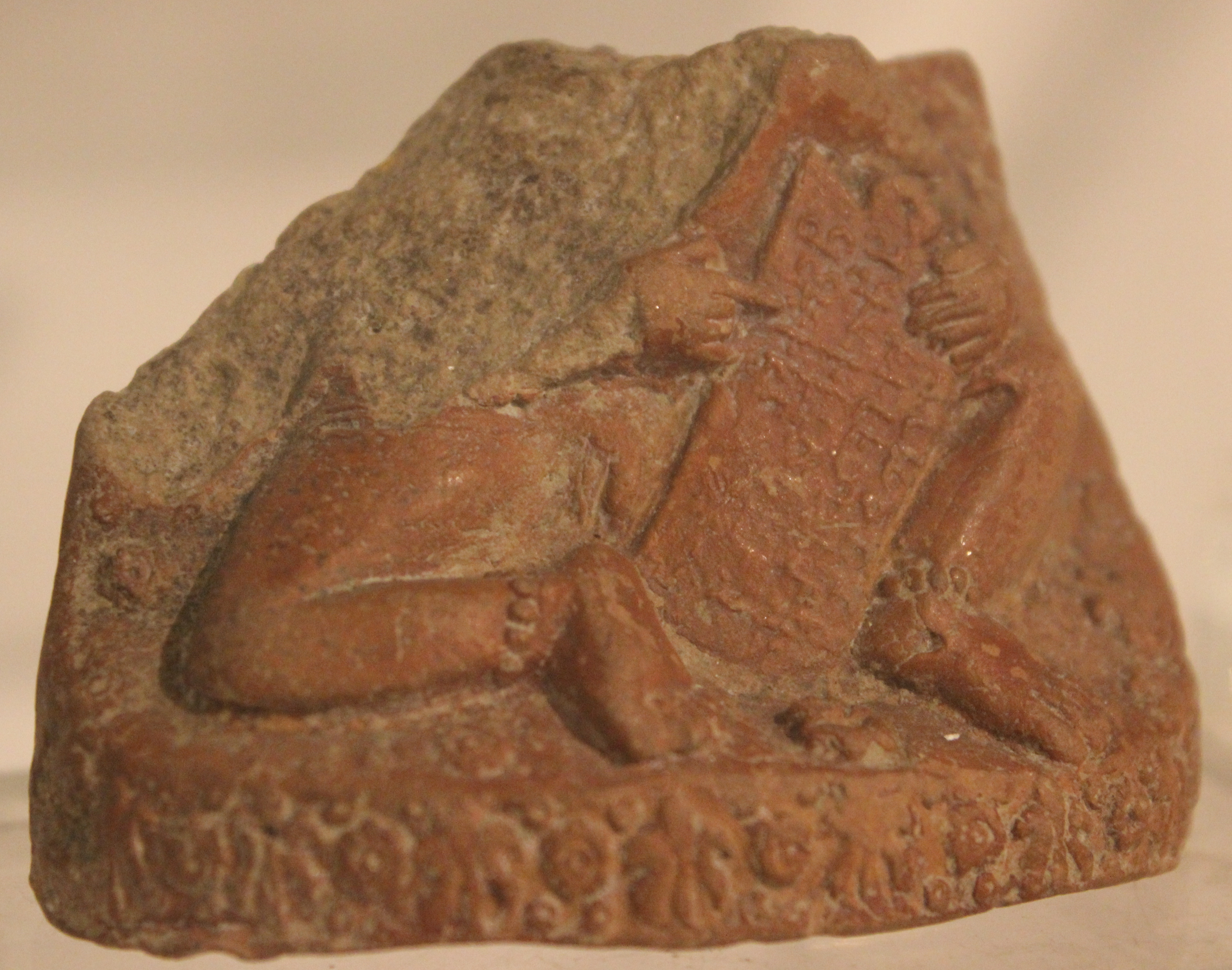
A Child Learning Brahmi Script, Srughna, 2nd century BCE

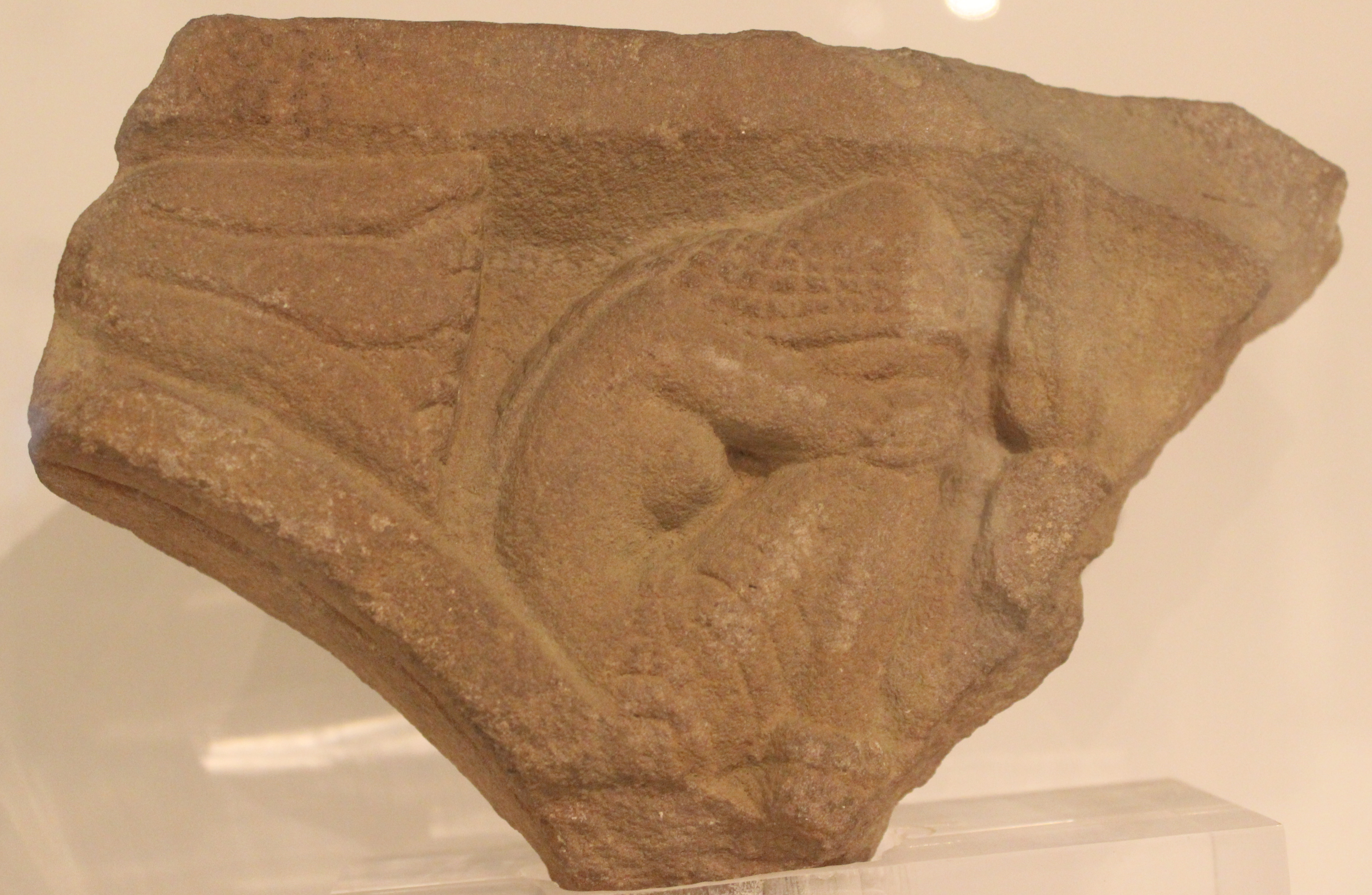
Woman in Grief (Shunga period)

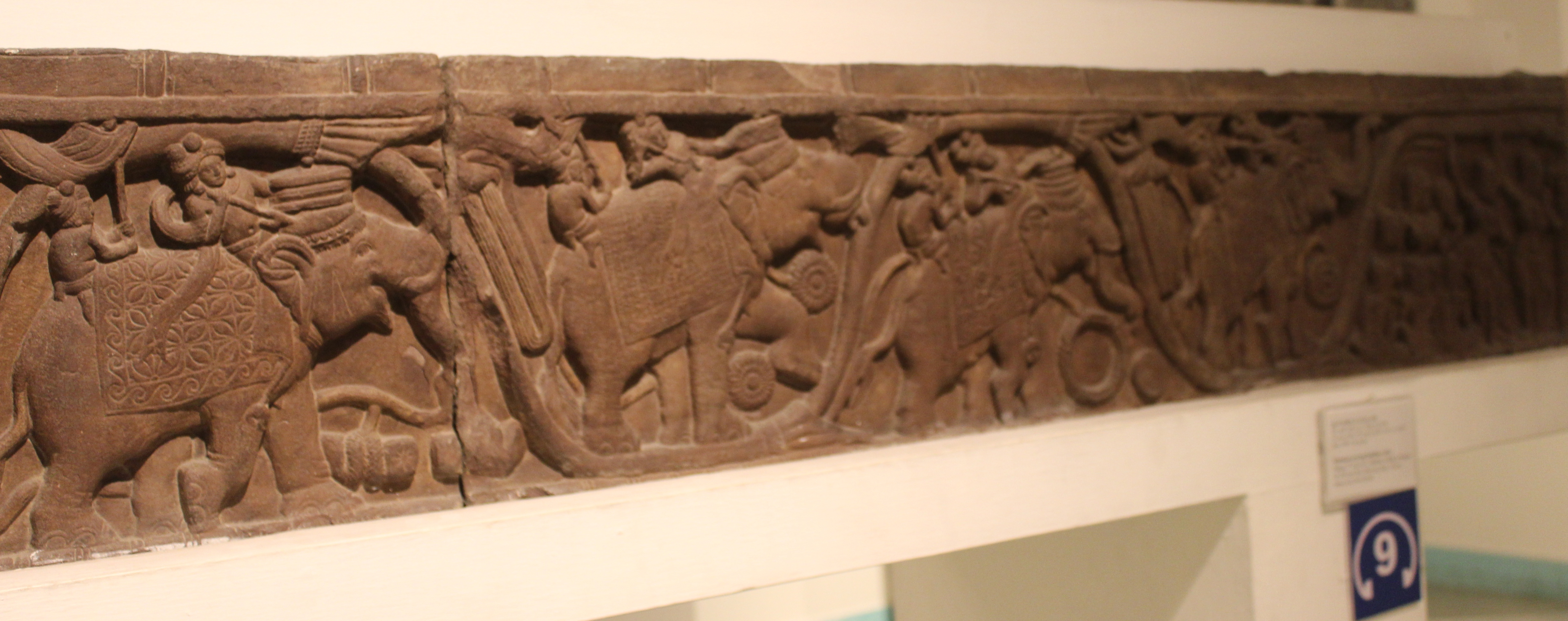
Railig from Barhut Stupa showing the Last Episode of Buddha's Life

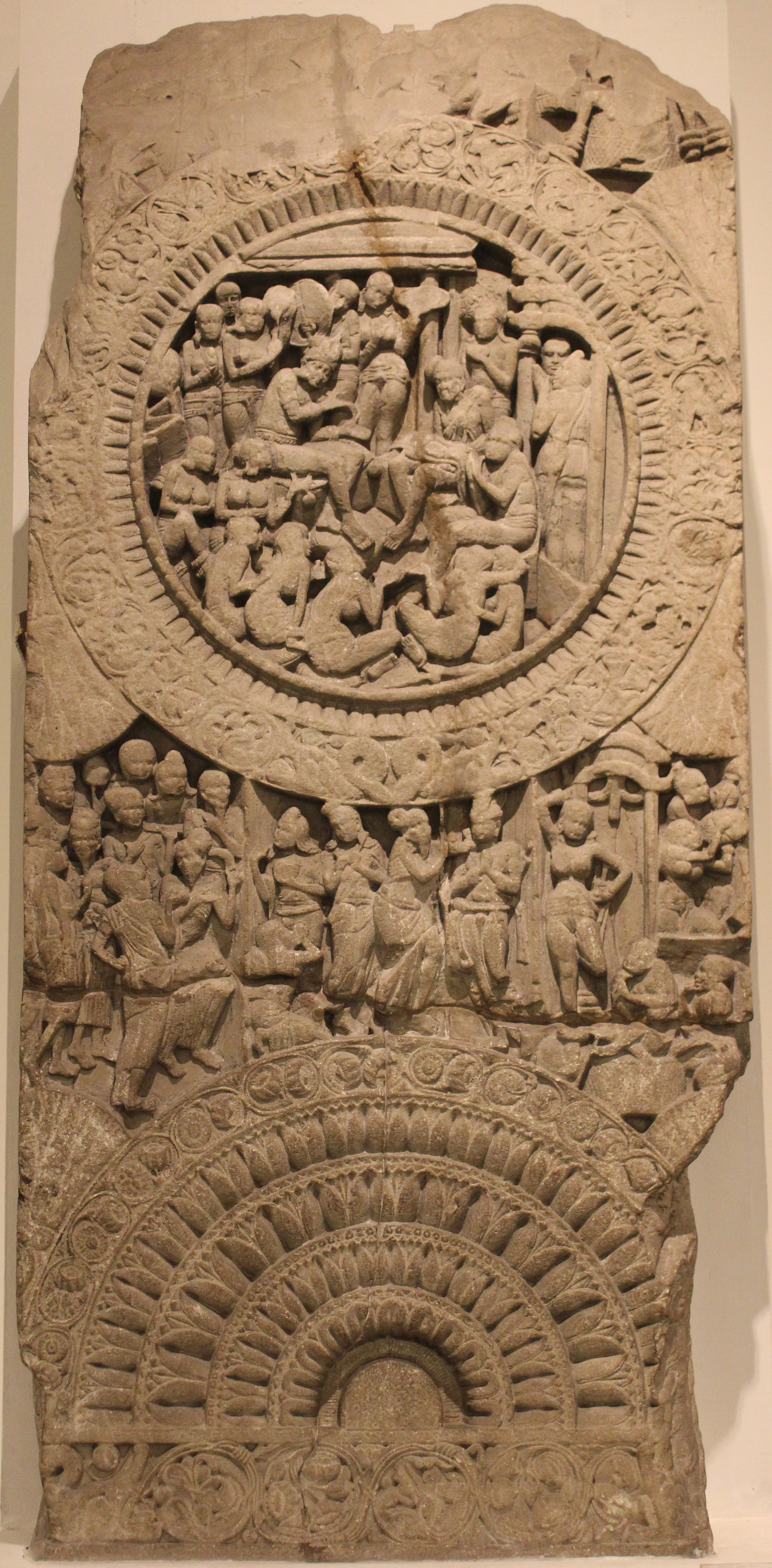
Asita visiting King Suddhodana (Satvahana period)

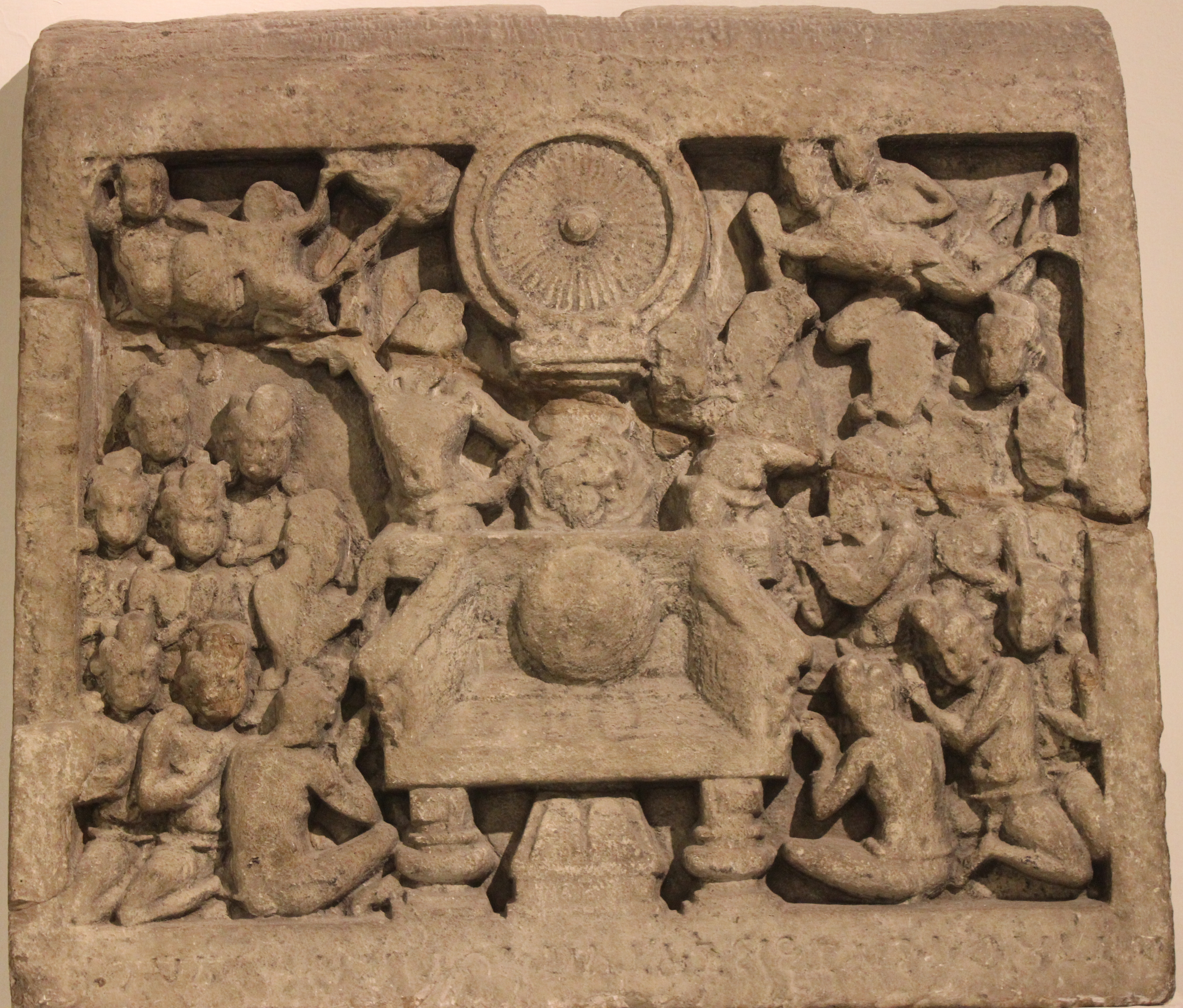
Different Symbols of Buddha

=== Kushana Gallery ===
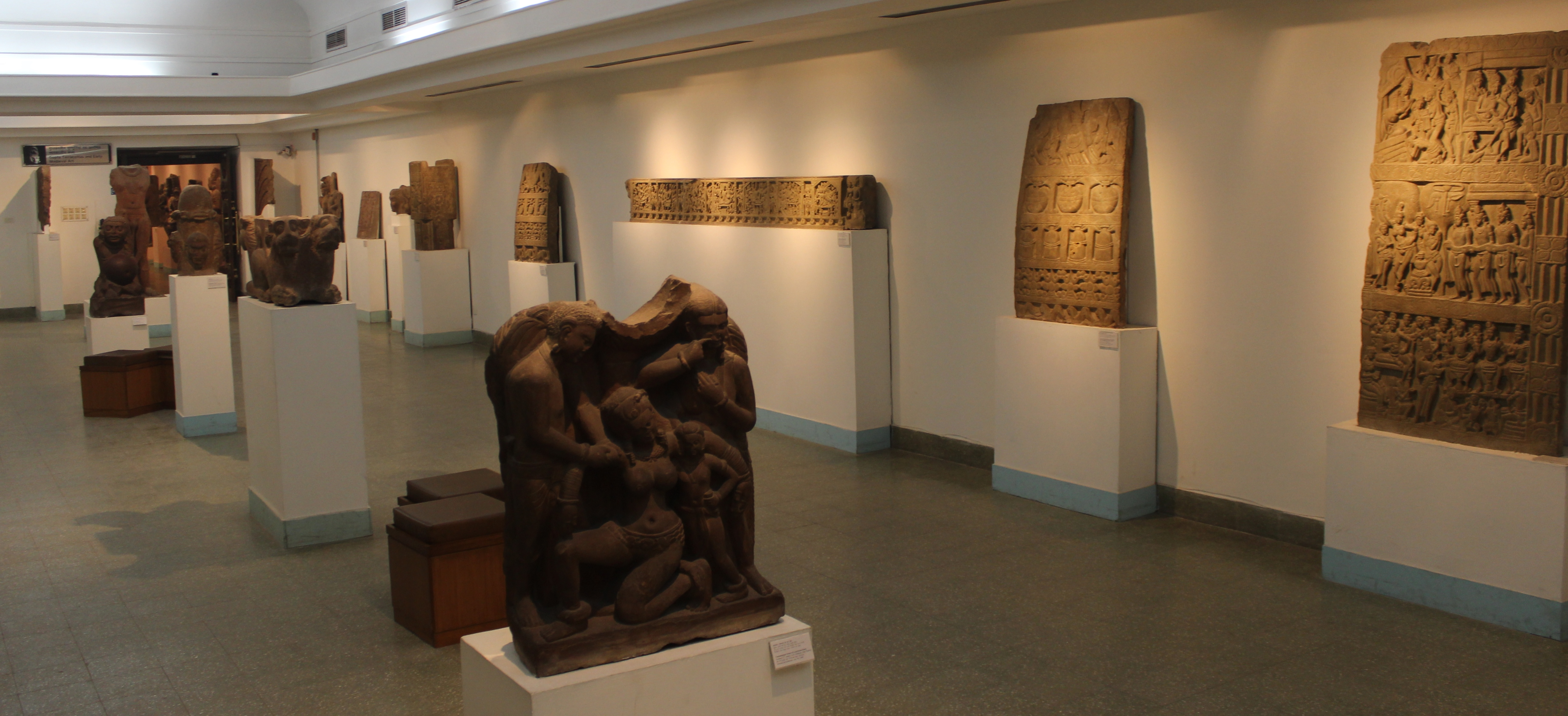
Kushana Gallery Artefacts

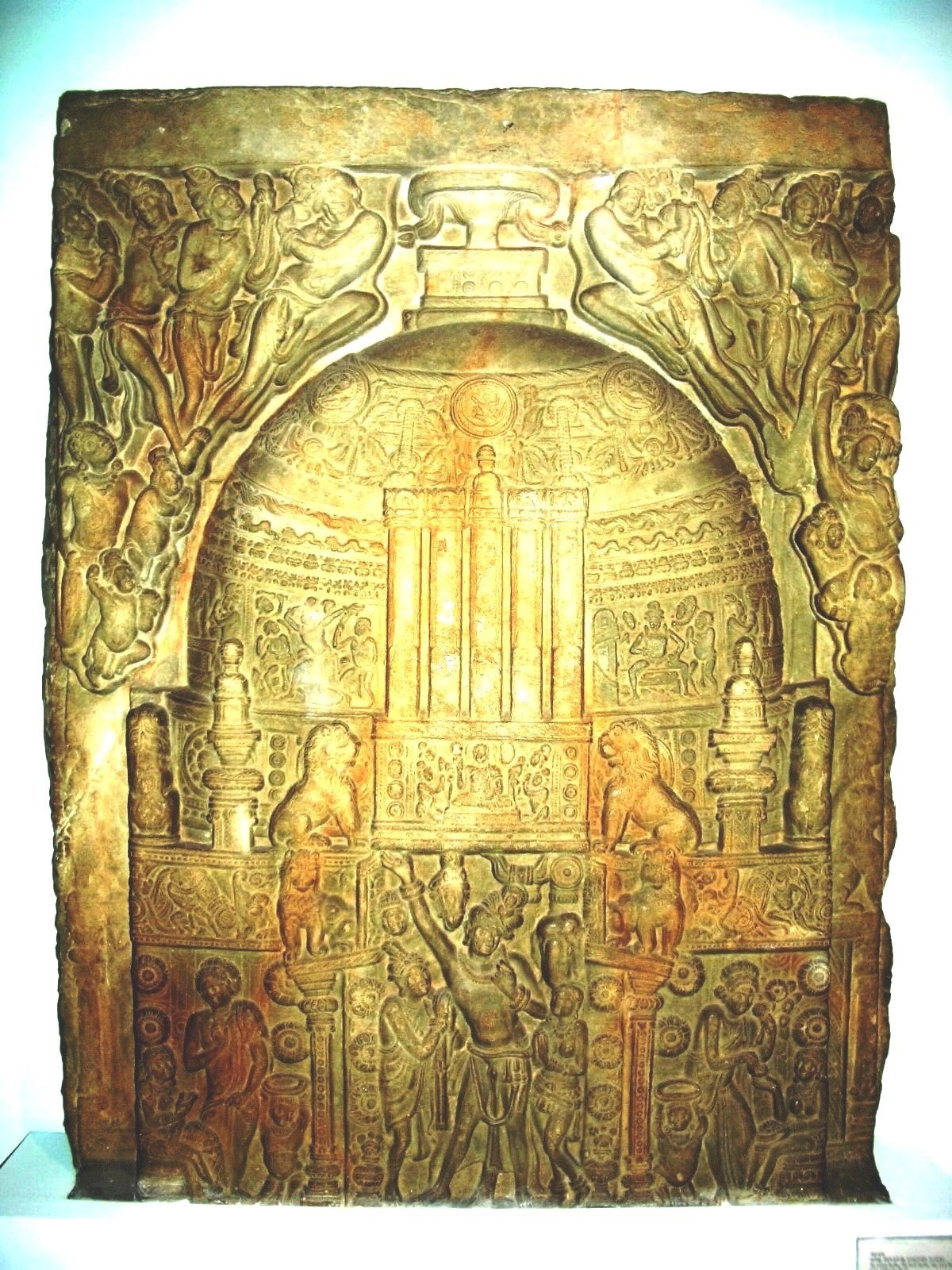
Amaravati Maha Stupa relief at National Museum, Delhii, India, 1st–2nd century CE. 2004

This gallery has art objects from the Kushan period (1st – 3rd century CE). The major school of arts were the Gandhara School of Art and the Mathura School of Art. The Gandhara school had huge influence of Greek Iconography and the themes were mainly Buddhist. Most prominent among the objects is the Standing Buddha, made in Grey schist stone in Gandhara School of Arts and it belongs to the 2nd century CE. This period was the first time when Buddha was shown in physical form. The Mathura school of arts had primary themes of Buddhism, Jainism and Brahmanism while the Gandhara Arts were primarily of Buddhist themes. Other sculptures include the Kuber (Hindu god of Fortune) from Ahichchhatra, the Chattramukhi Shivlinga, the Bodhisattva, and the Jain votive plaques.

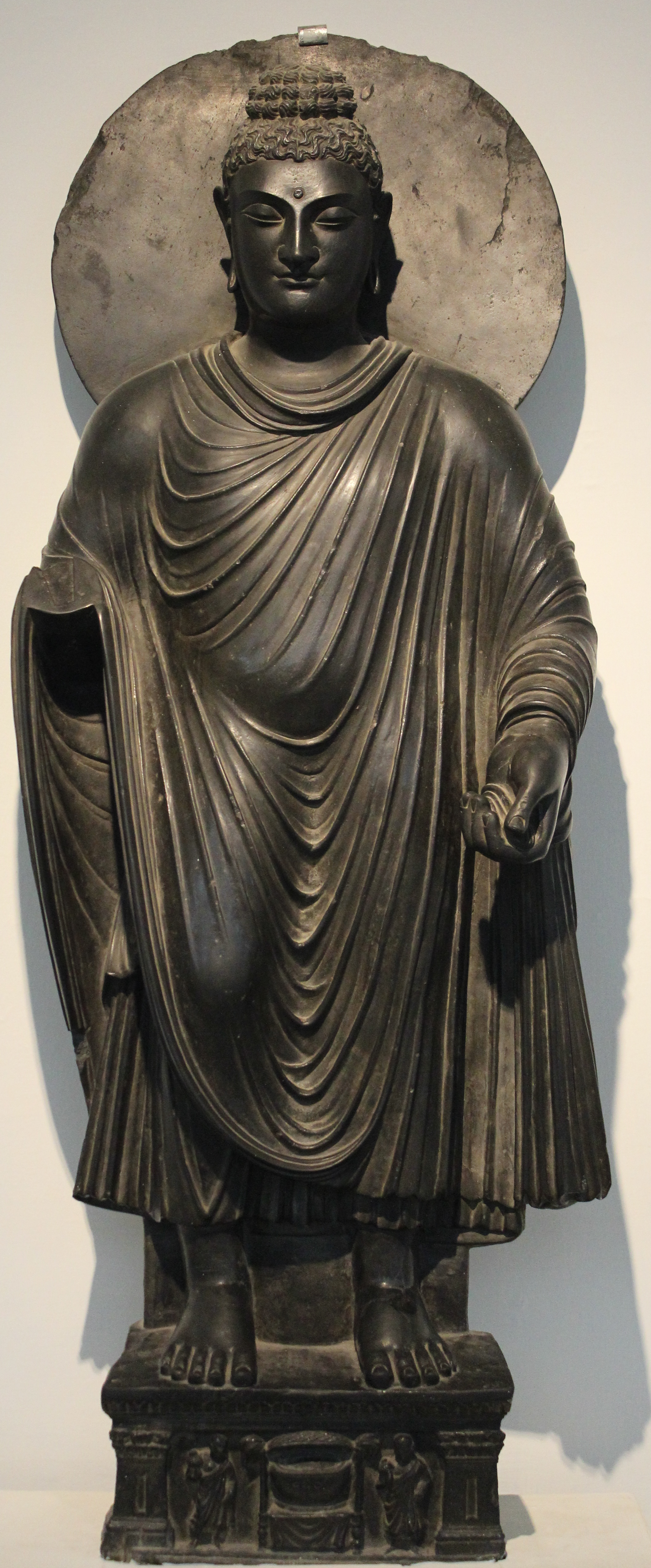
Buddha (Human Figure)

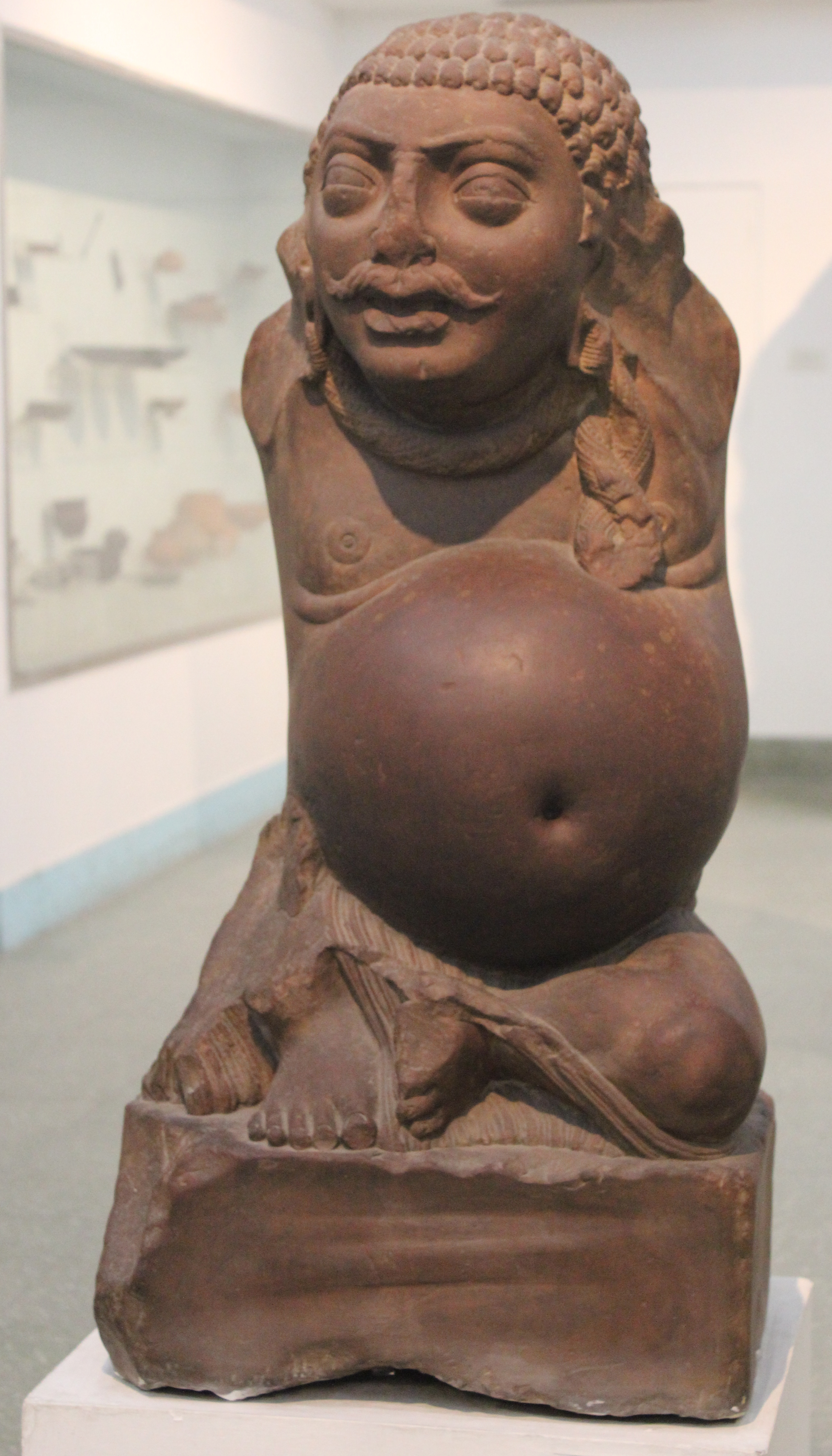
Maitrey Buddha (Future Buddha Incarnation)

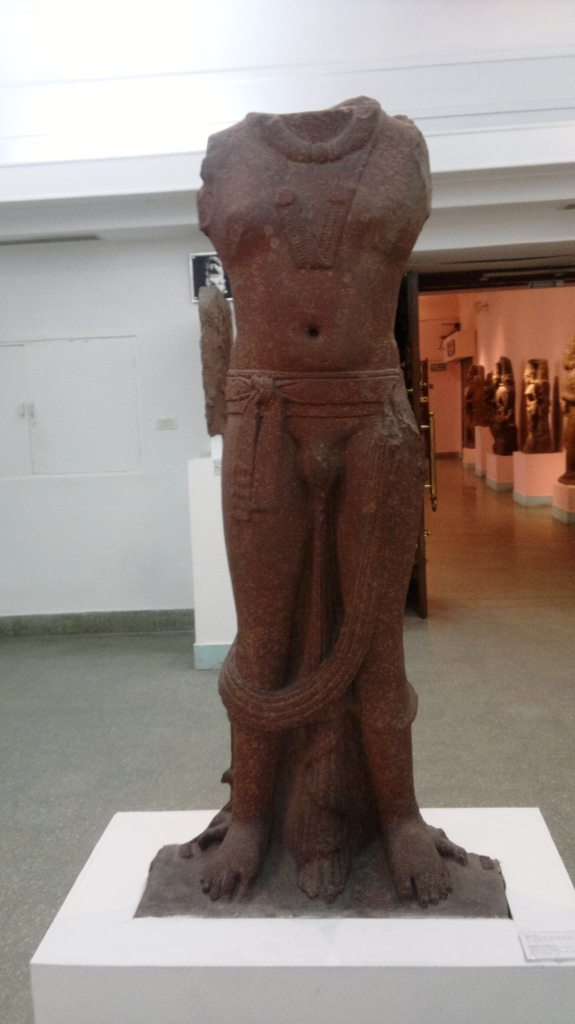
Boddhisatva

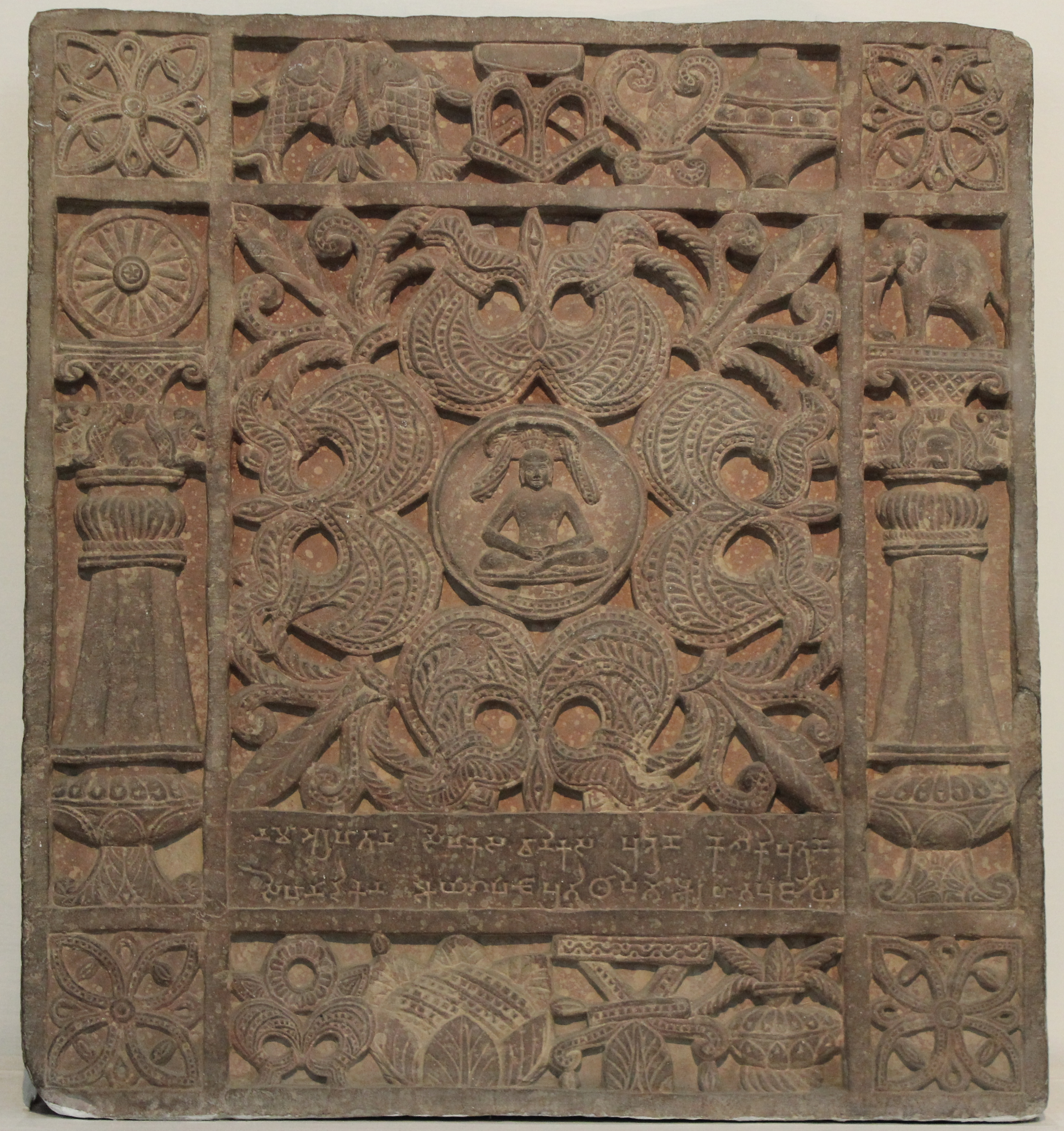
Ayagapata, Jain votive plaque

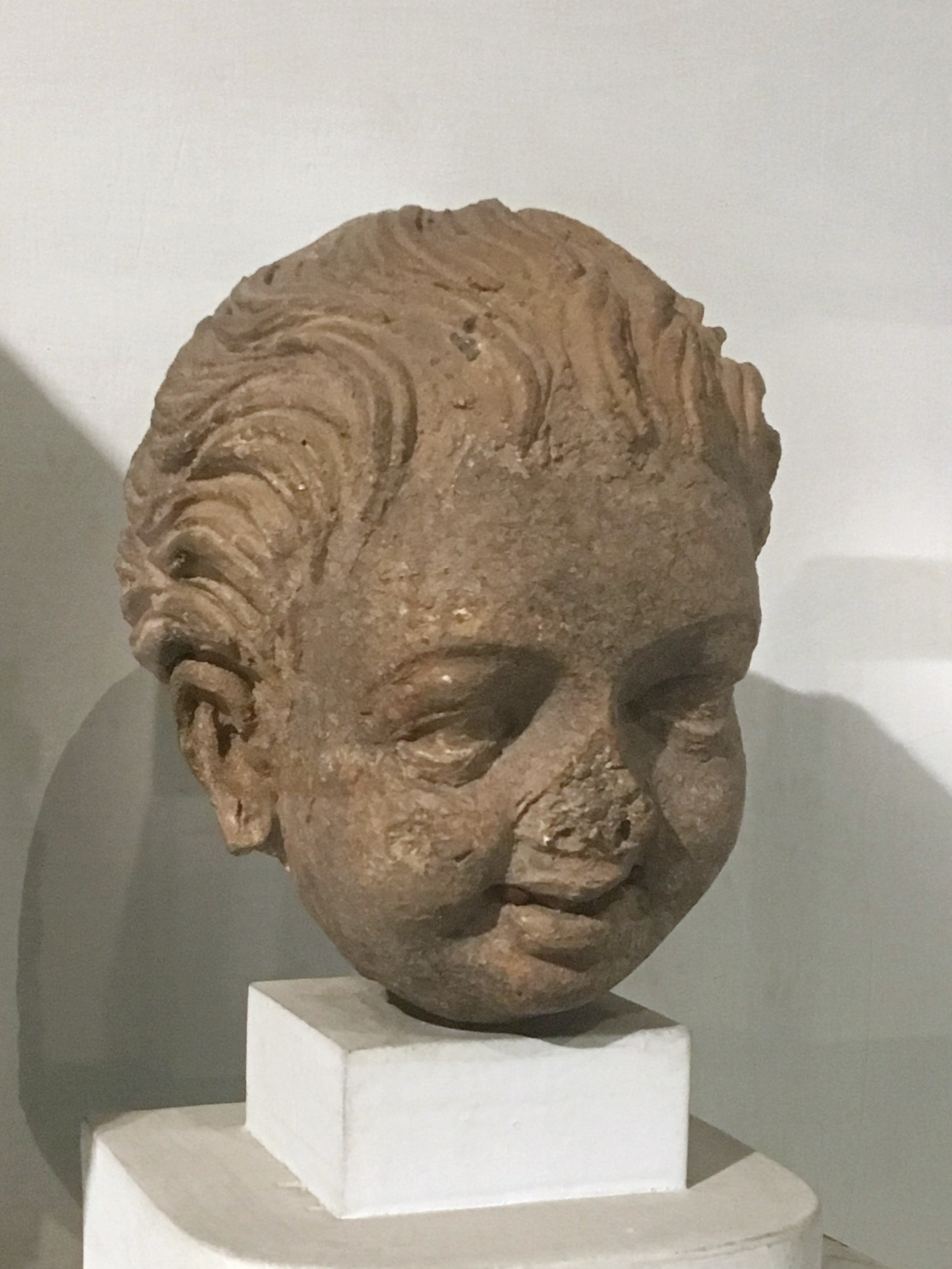
"Laughing boy", stucco from Gandhara, 2nd–3rd century CE

=== Gupta Gallery ===
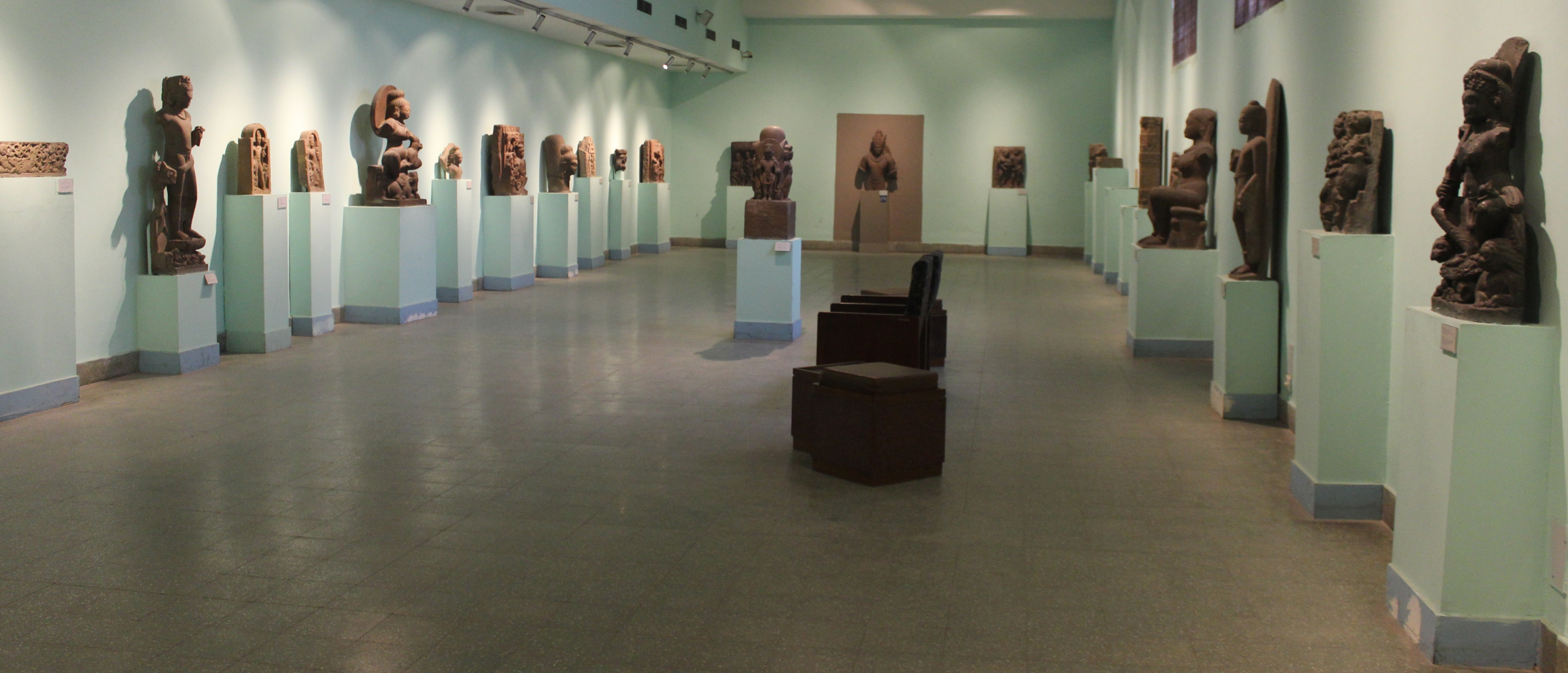
Gupta Gallery Artefacts

As the name suggests, this gallery exhibits artefacts from the Gupta dynasty (4th–6th centuries CE). The art of the Gupta period presents a high watermark in Indian art. Mathura and Sarnath were the main centres of artistic activity. Under the patronage of Gupta rulers, sculptures attained a perfection of form that set the standard for artistic beauty for the coming centuries. Major developments in iconography took place during this period as the Kushan sculptures seem to be further perfected and some of the sculptures of this period are considered unsurpassed for the proportioned figures with clear features.

- Sculptures depicting scenes from the epics of Ramayana and Mahabharata
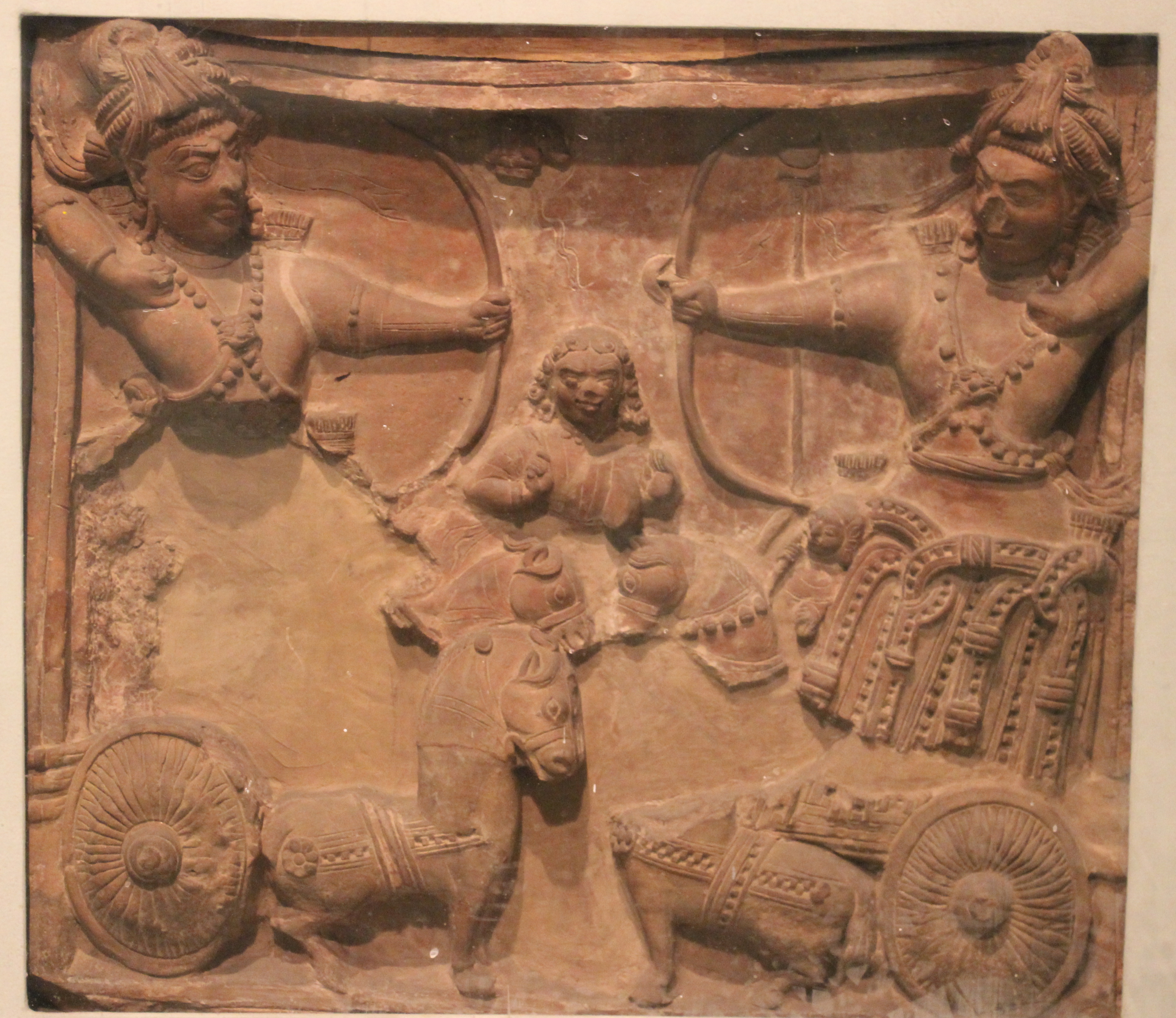
Scenes from Mahabharata

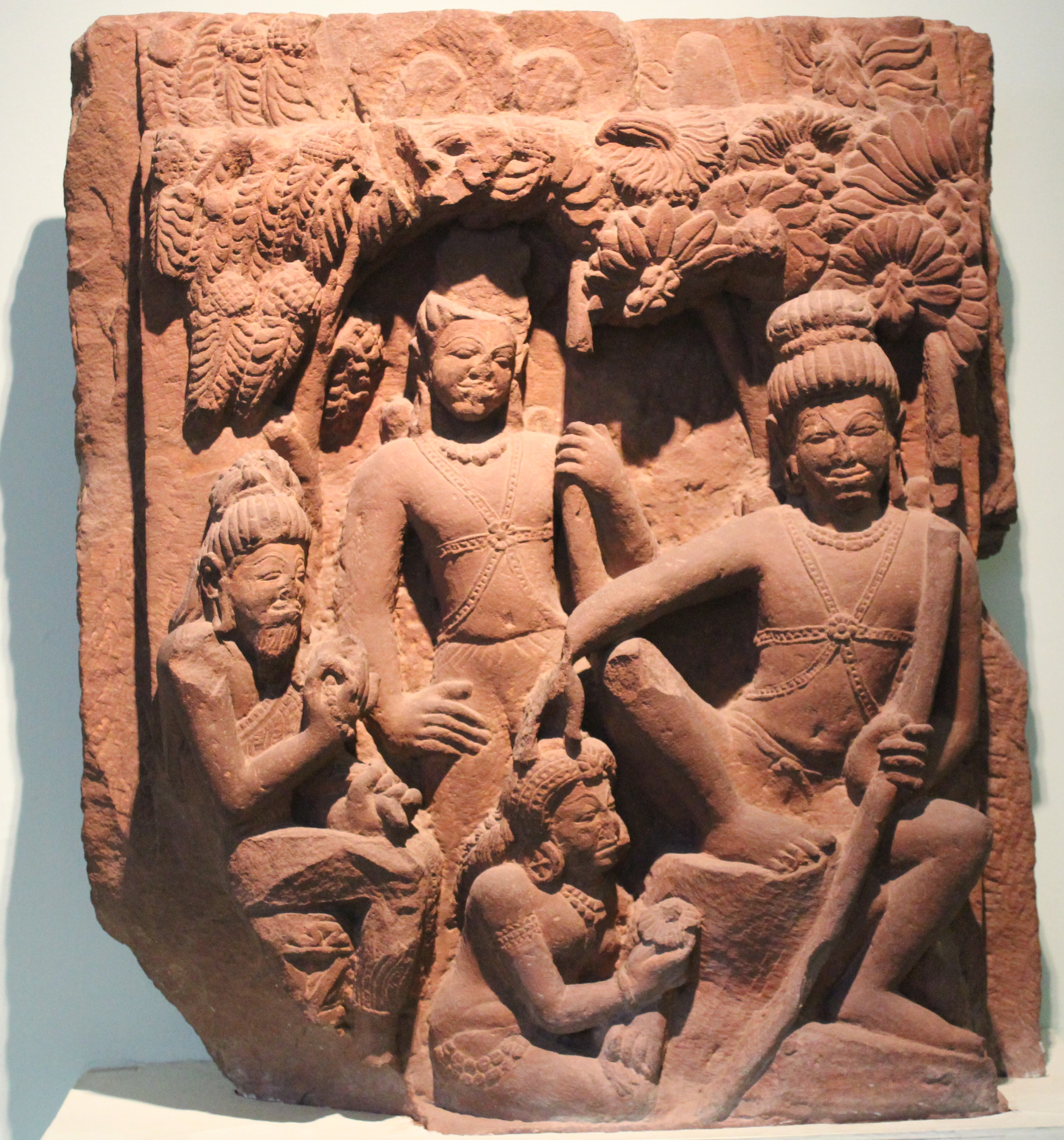
Rama redeeming Ahilya (Ramayana)

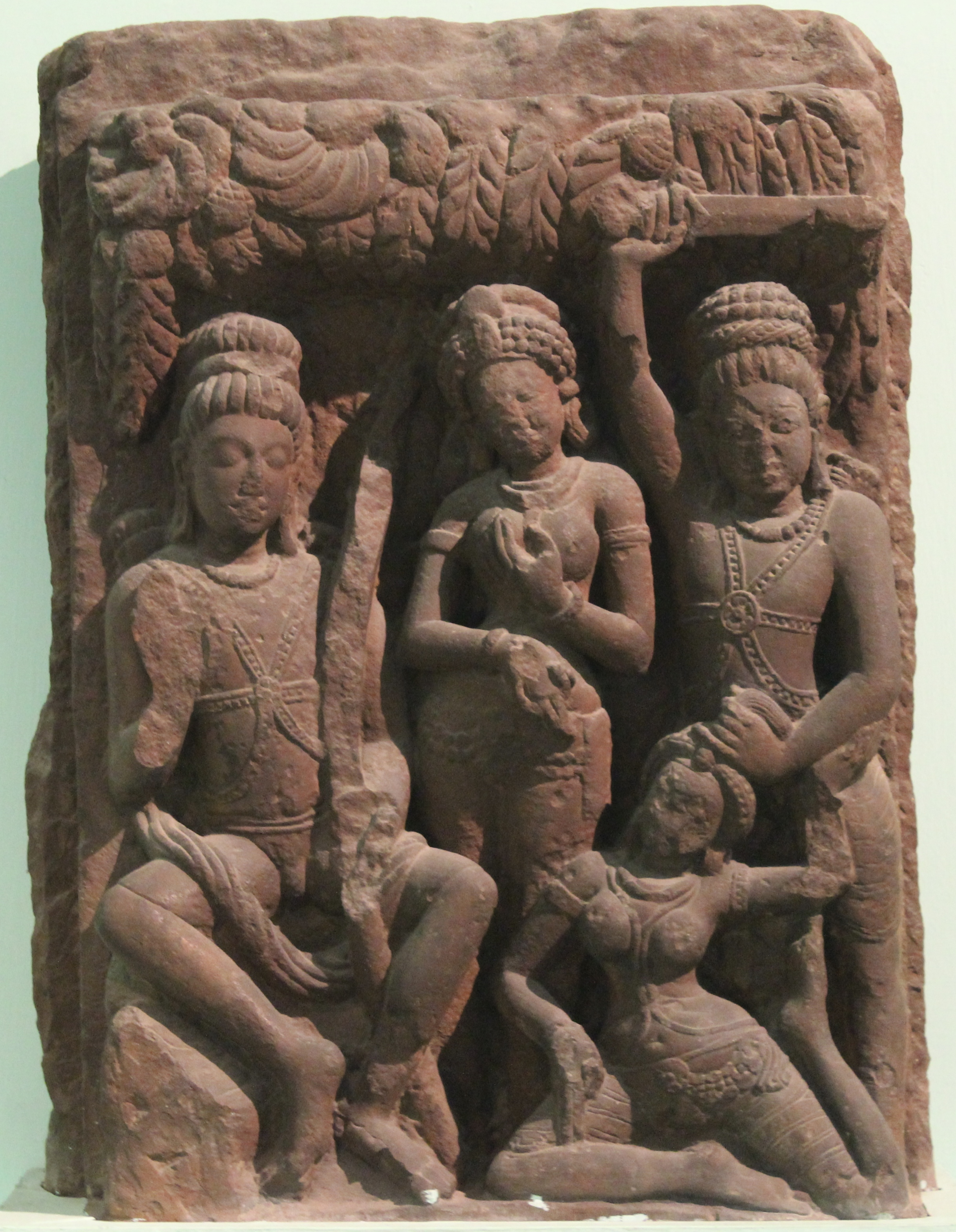
Laxman cutting the nose of Surpanakha (Ramayana)
- Sculptures
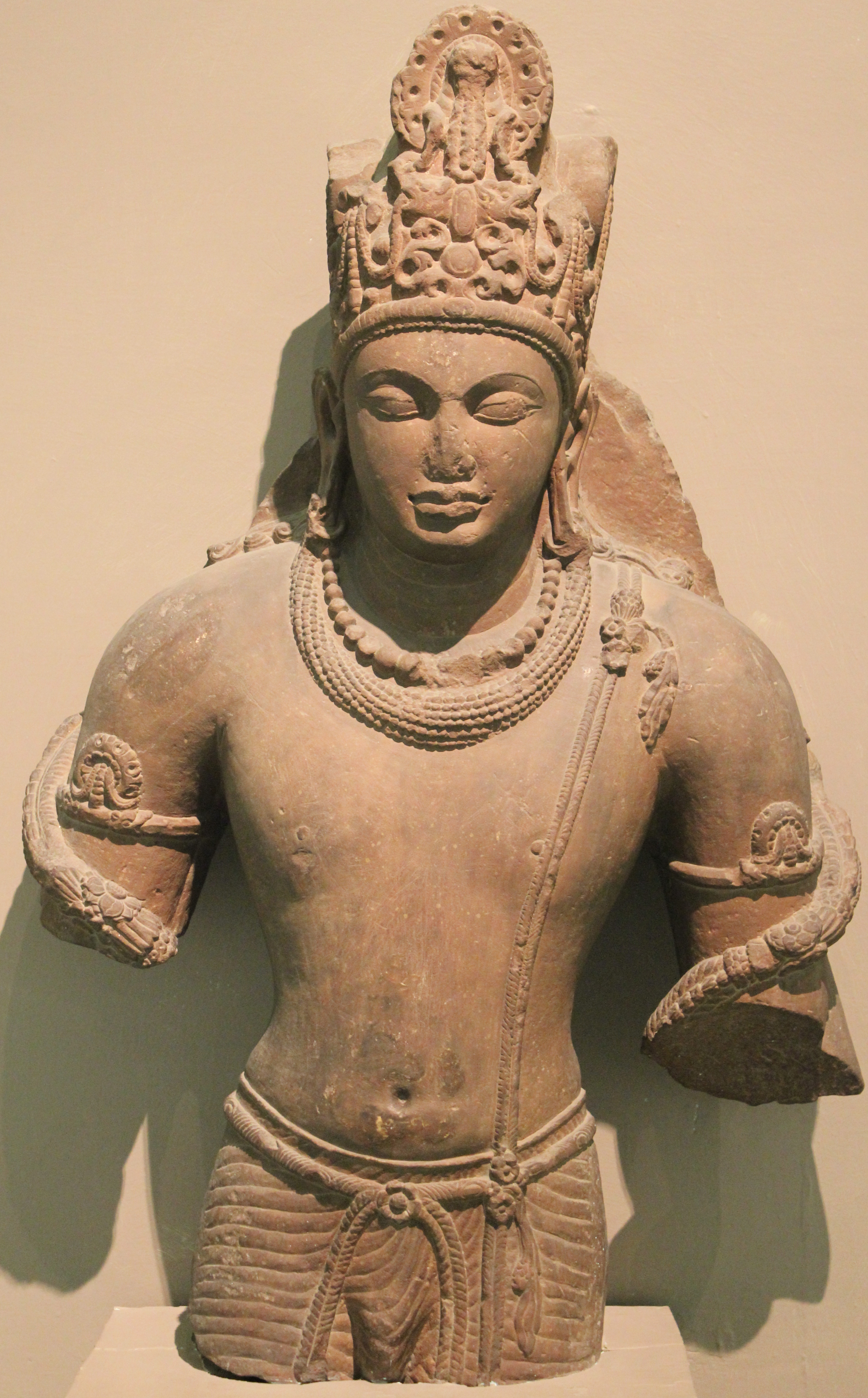
Vishnu

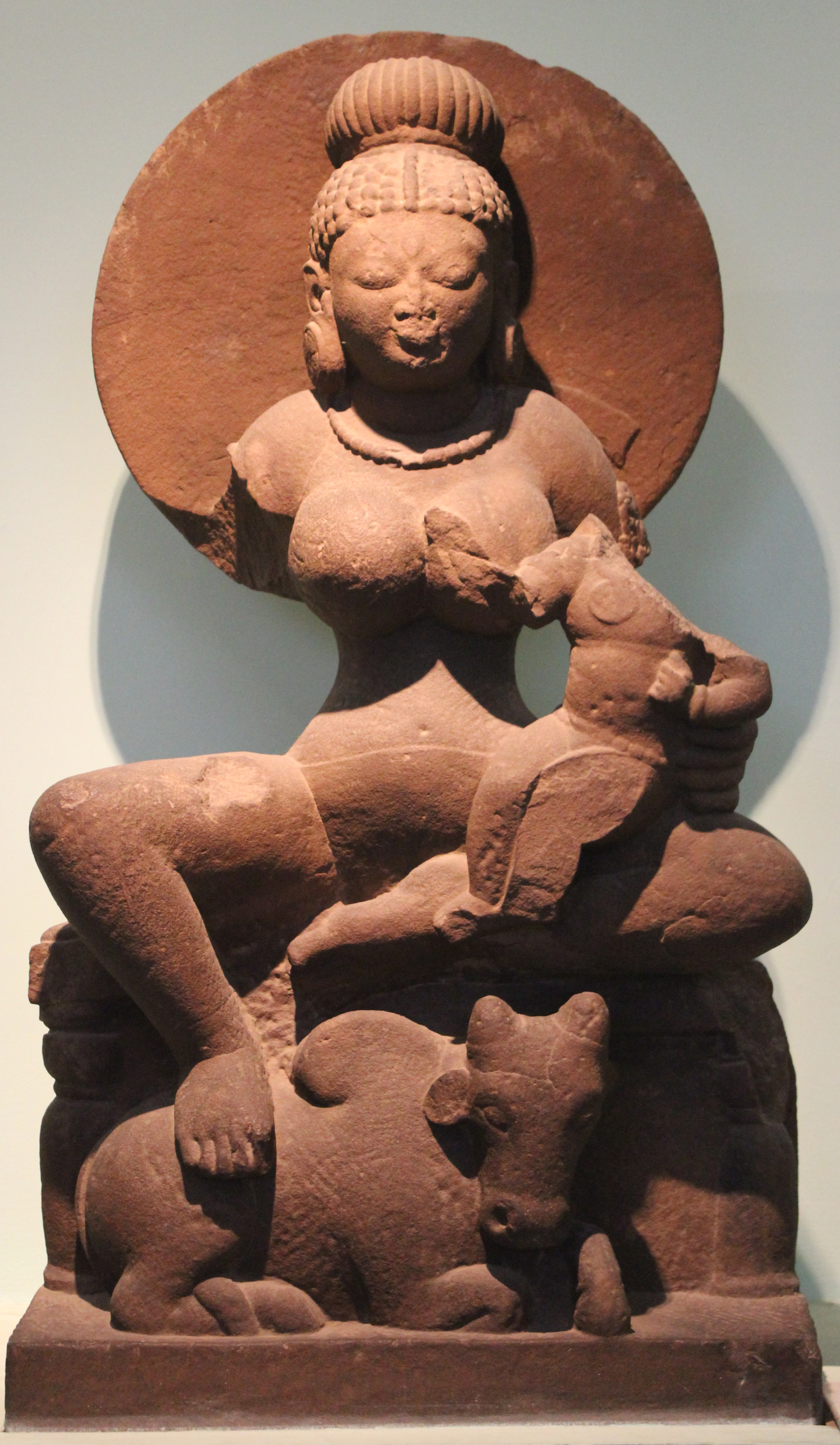
Mother Goddess

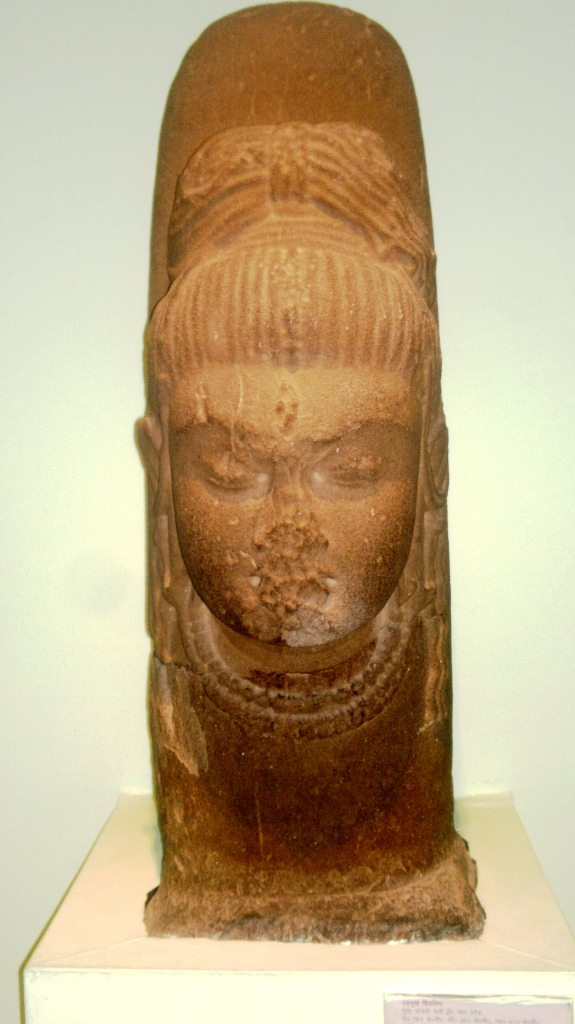
Mukhalinga of Shiva, 5th century CE

=== Medieval Arts Gallery ===
The sculptures from the medieval period are divided into two categories: Early and Late. The artefacts from the respective periods are divided into two galleries.

==== Early Medieval Artefacts ====
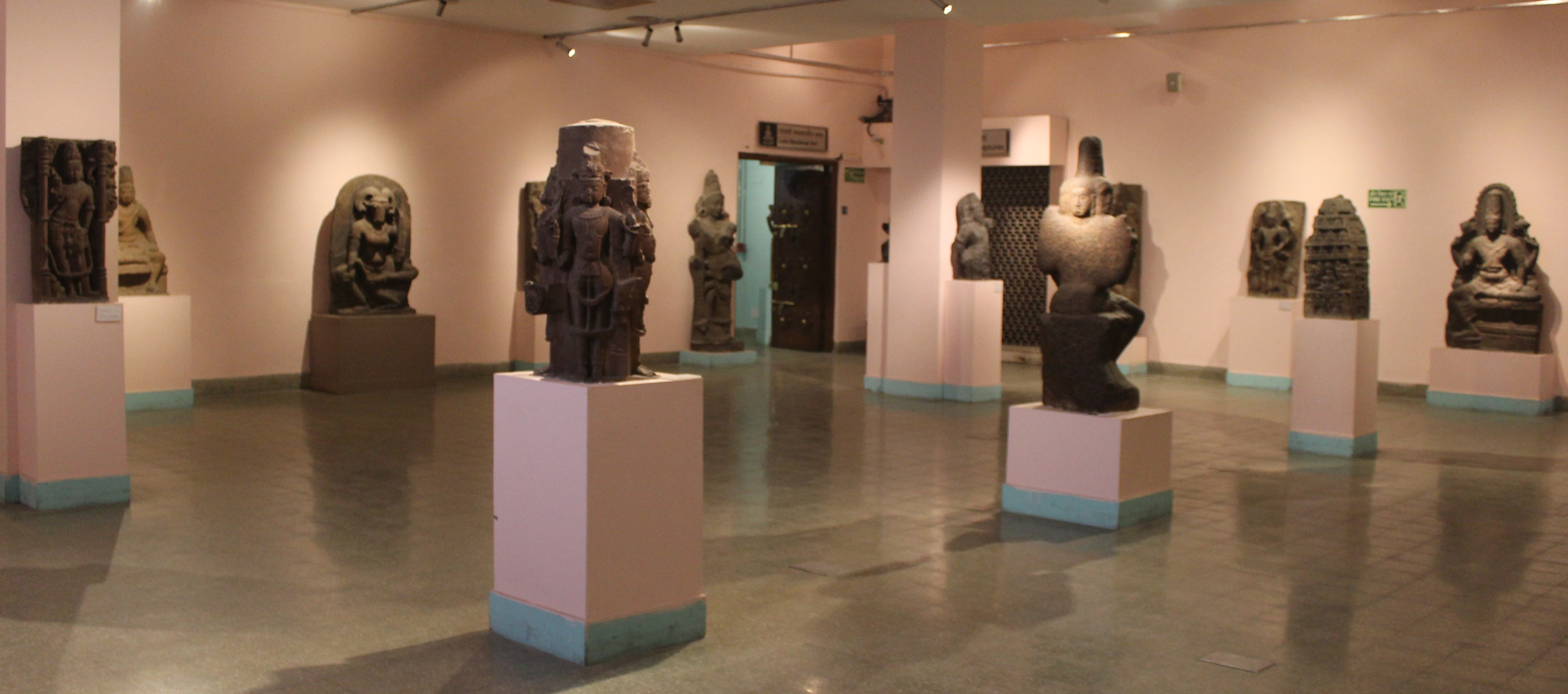
Early Medieval Artefacts

This gallery has sculptures ranging from the 7th to 10th centuries. After the fall of the Gupta empire, the Indian subcontinent was divided and it was controlled by different dynasties in different parts of India like

- Palas in the East
- Maitrakas in the West
- Vardhanas and Pratiharas in the North
- Pallavas, Cholas and Chalukyas in the South

There was a general decline in the artistic quality because of the limited number of master craftsmen and the large number of temples being built.

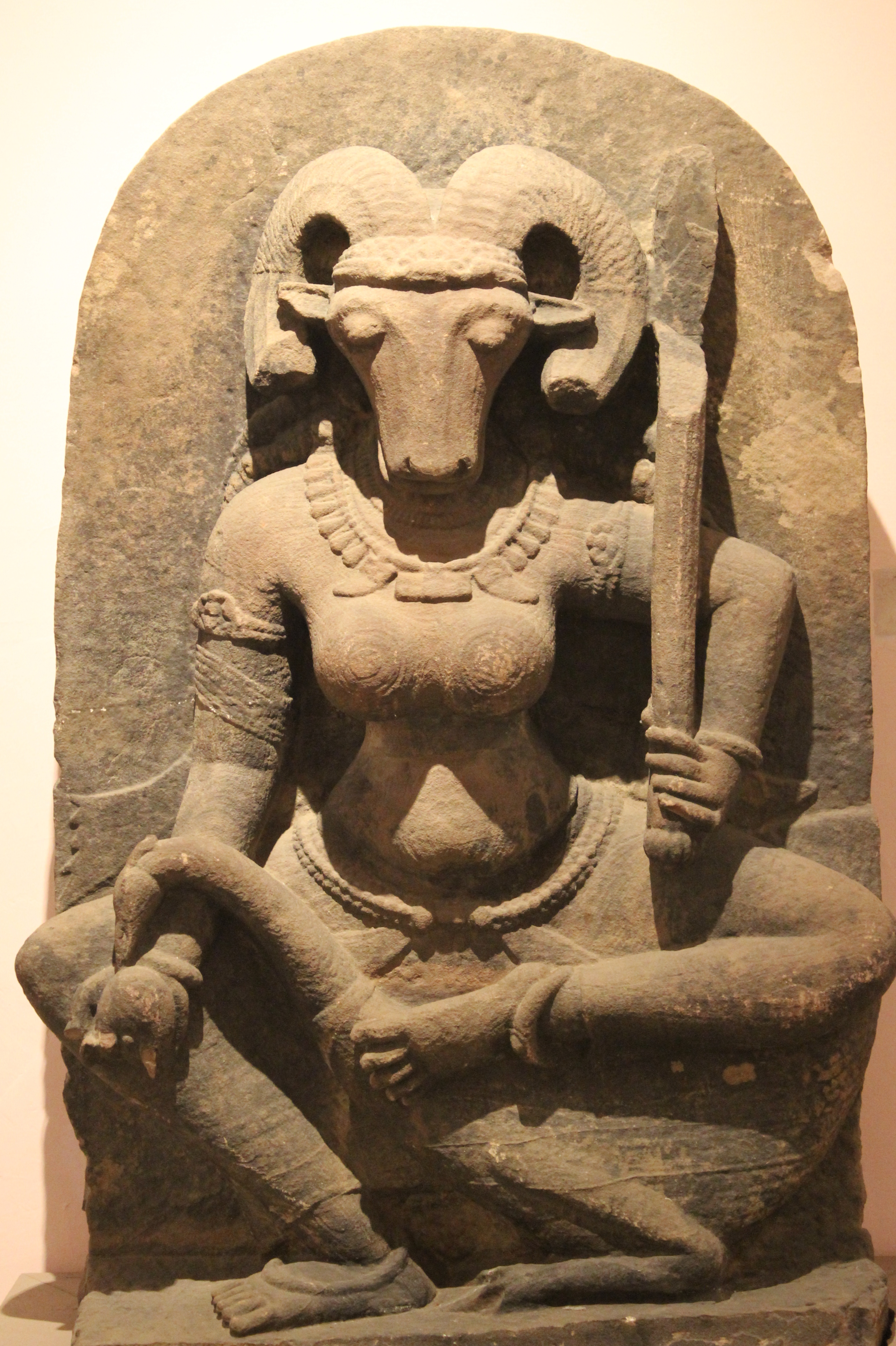
Yogini (Mother Goddess)

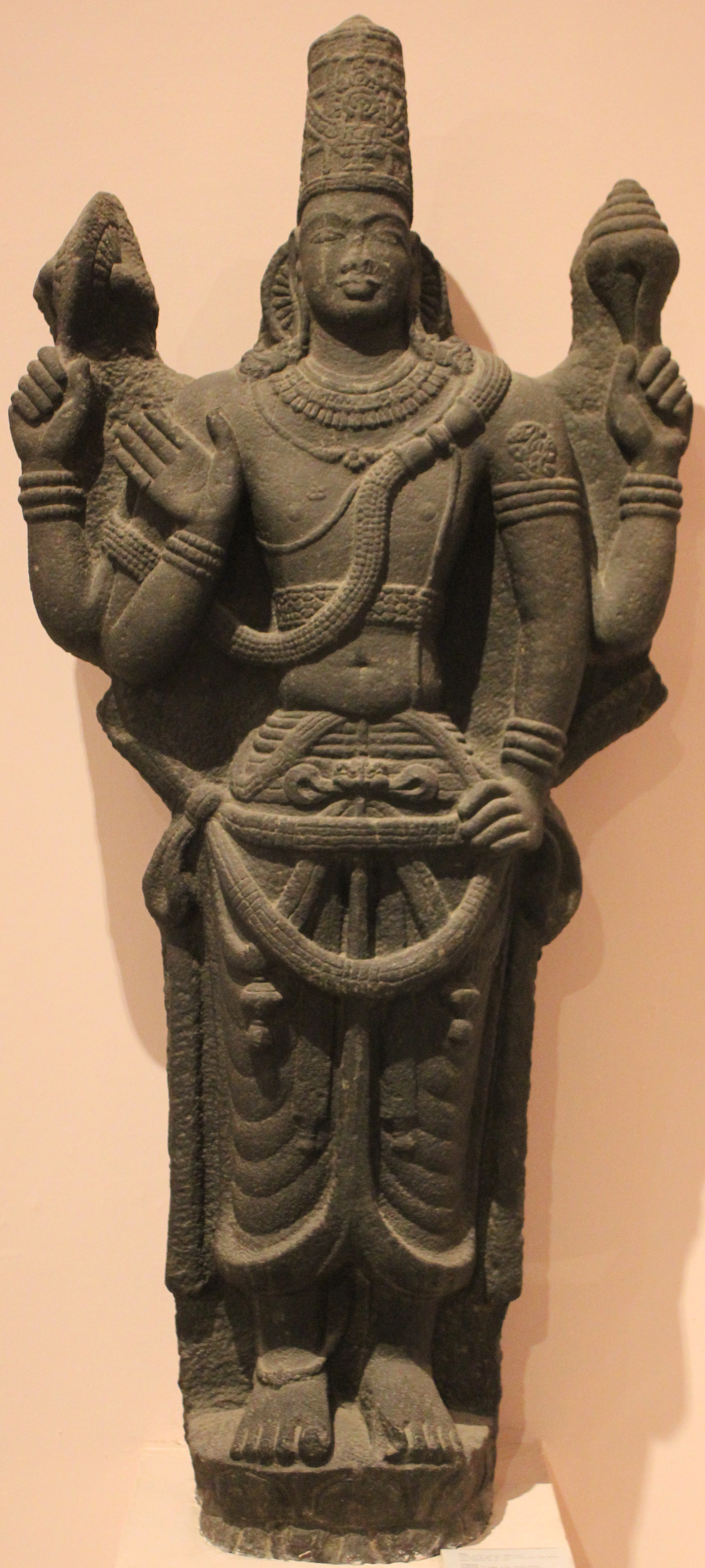
Vishnu (Pallava dynasty)

==== Late Medieval Artefacts ====
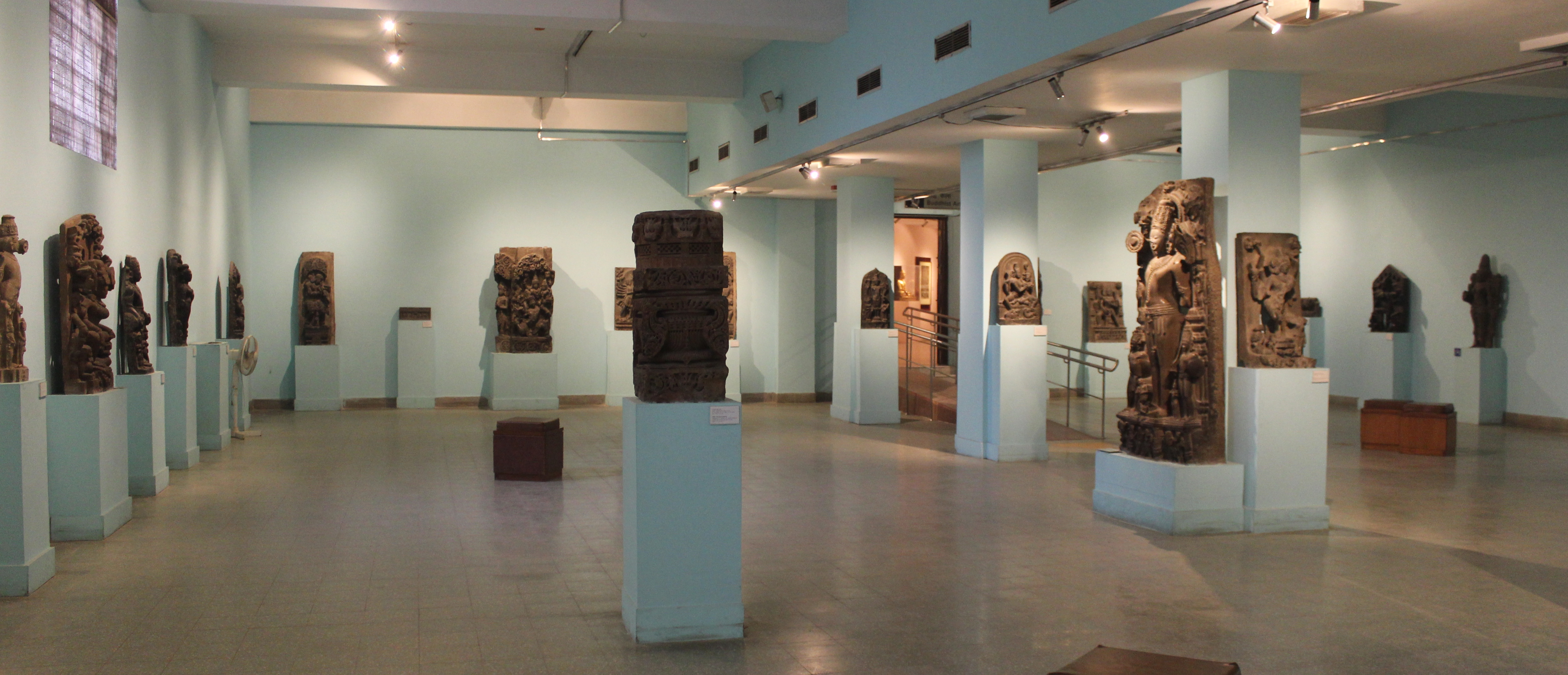
Late Medieval Artefacts

This gallery has sculptures ranging from the 10th to 13th centuries. The country was further sub divided into a number of separate principalities during this period.

- Hoysalas and Nayakas in the South
- Paramars and Chandelas in the North
- Gajapatis and Senas in the East
- Chahamanas (Chauhans) in the West

The main artefacts in this gallery are:

- Sun God
- Saraswati, the goddess of music, learning and intelligence. Carved in marble, the statue from Pallu, Rajasthan, is a highly sophisticated and delicate work.
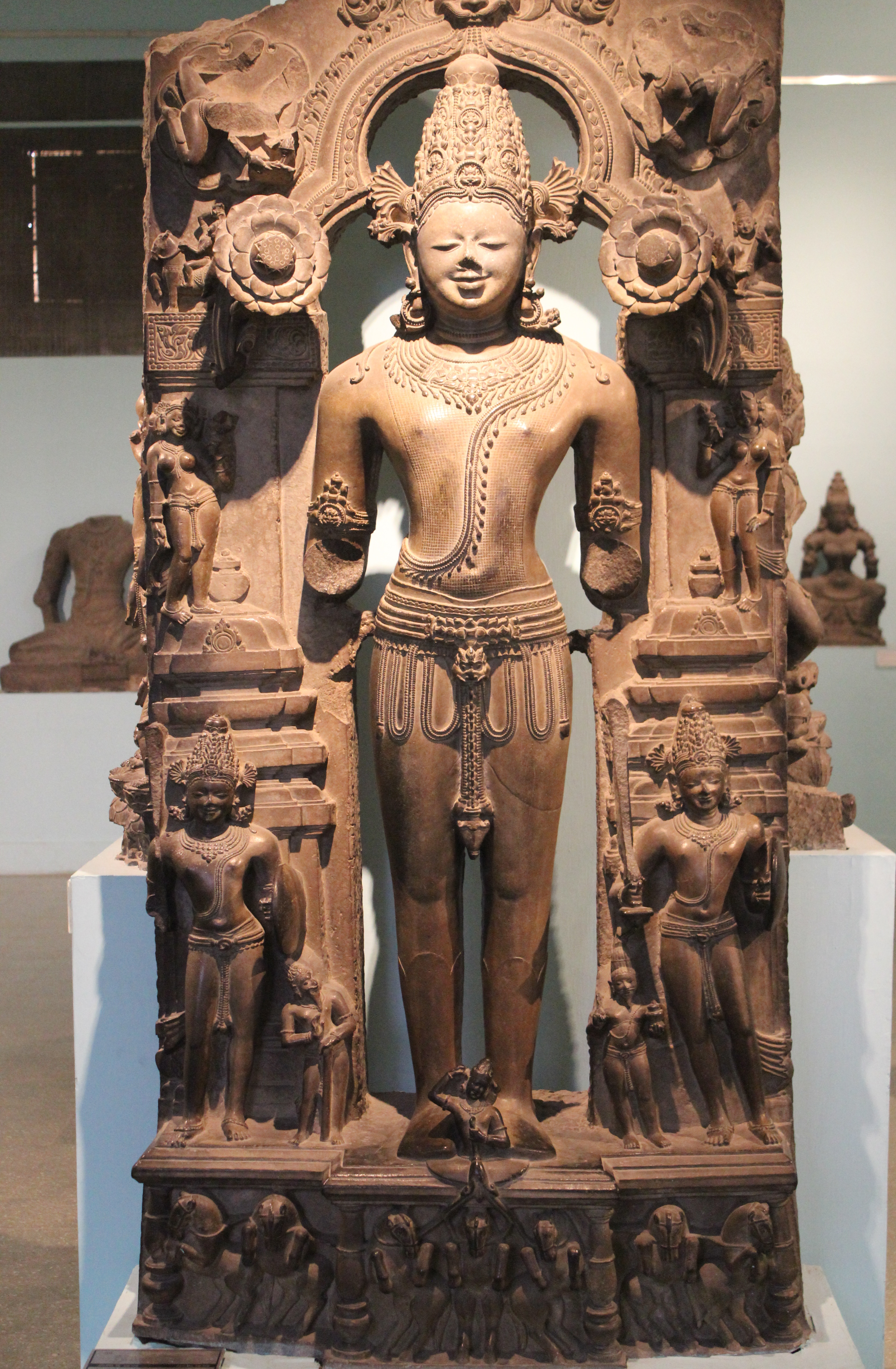
Surya (From Sun Temple, Konarak)

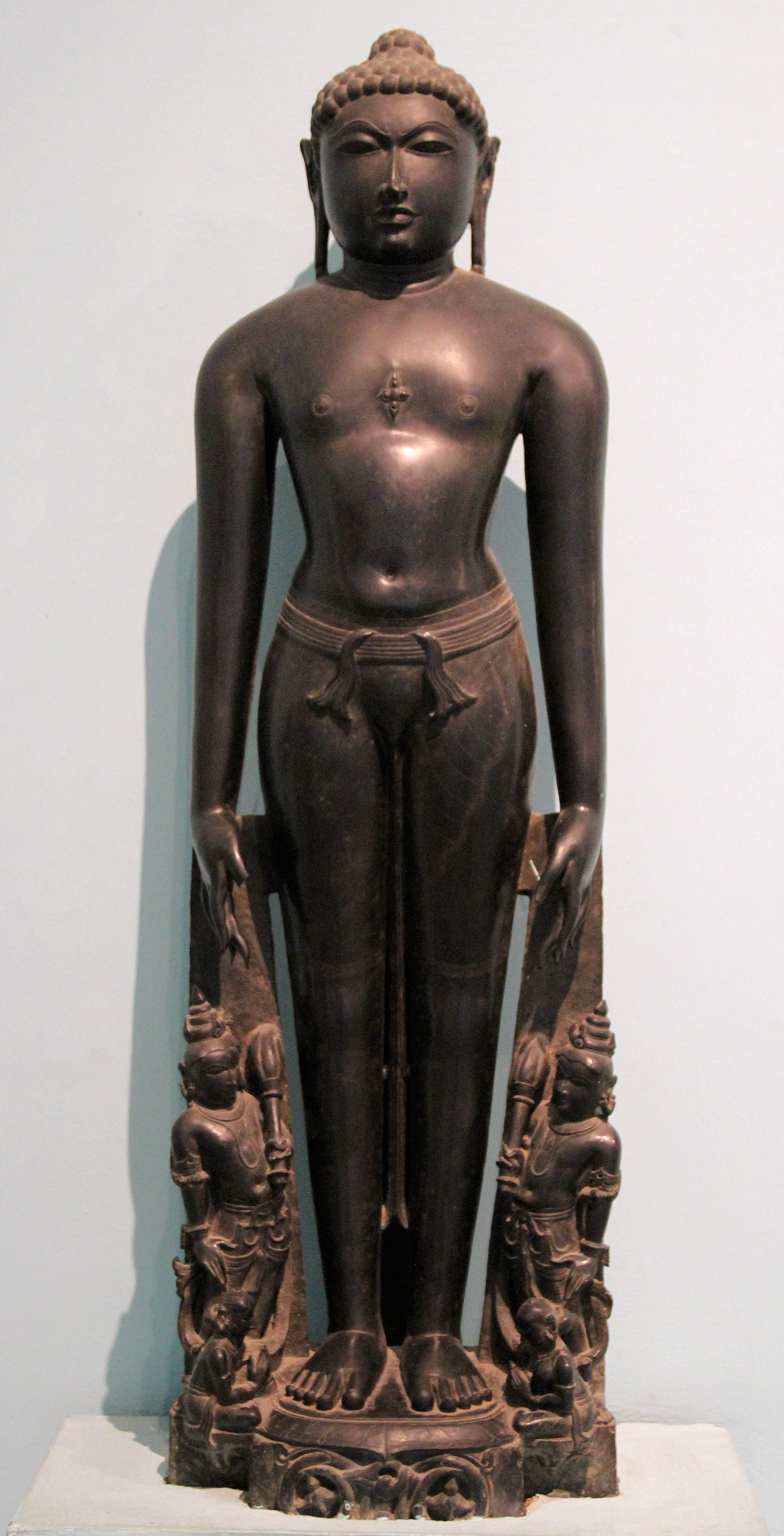
Neminatha (22nd Jain Tirthankar), 11th century

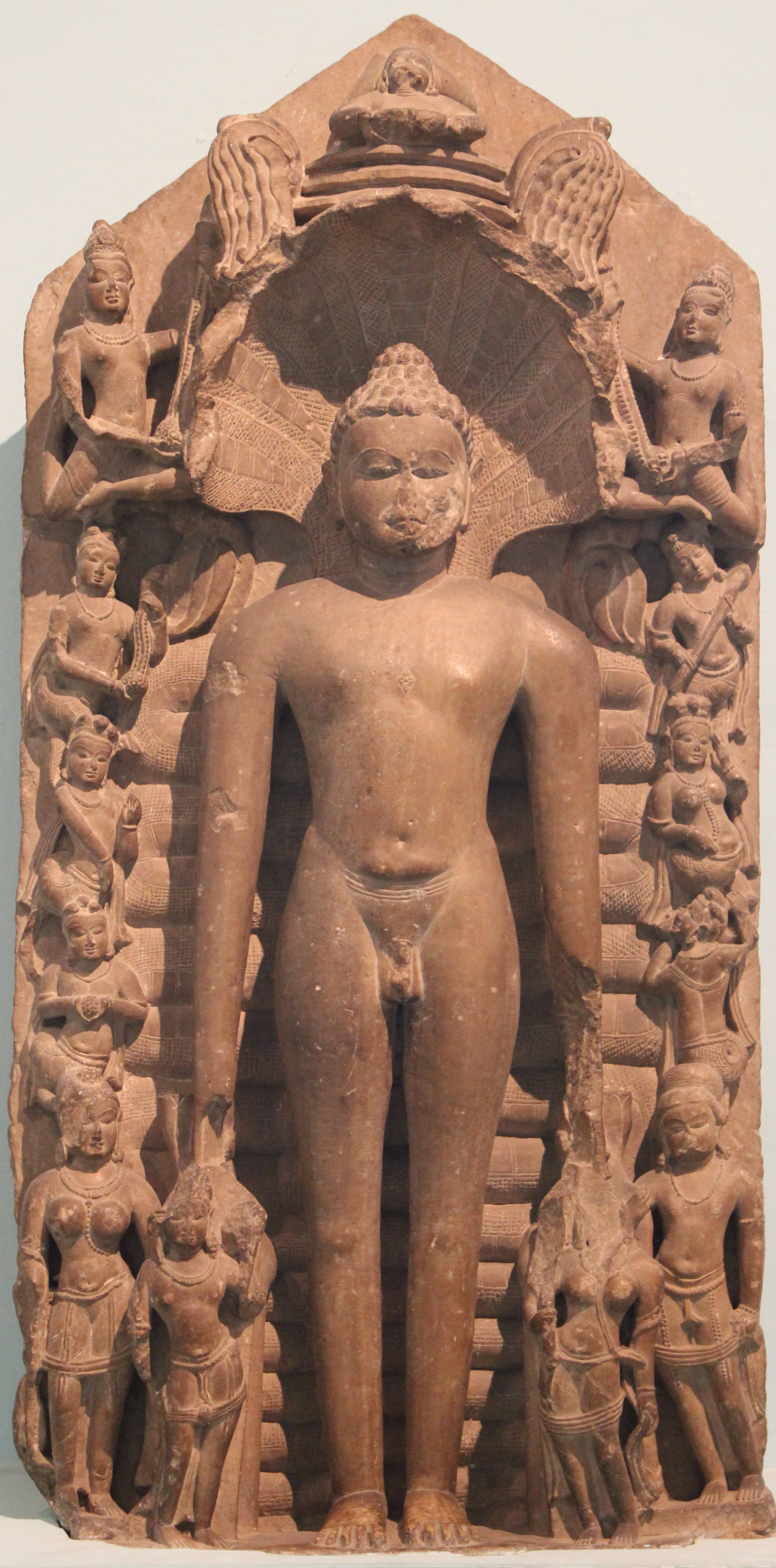
Parsvanatha (23rd Tirthankar), 10th century

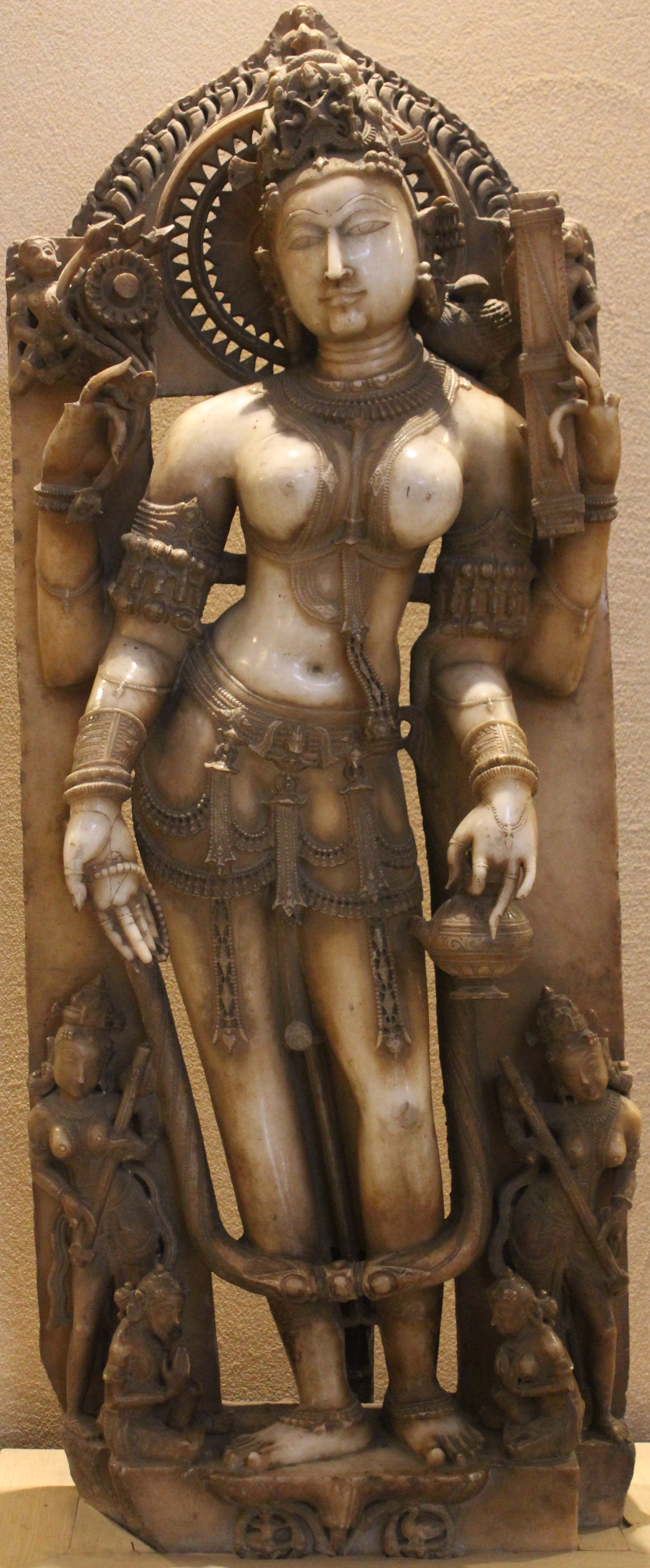
Saraswati (Chauhan dynasty)

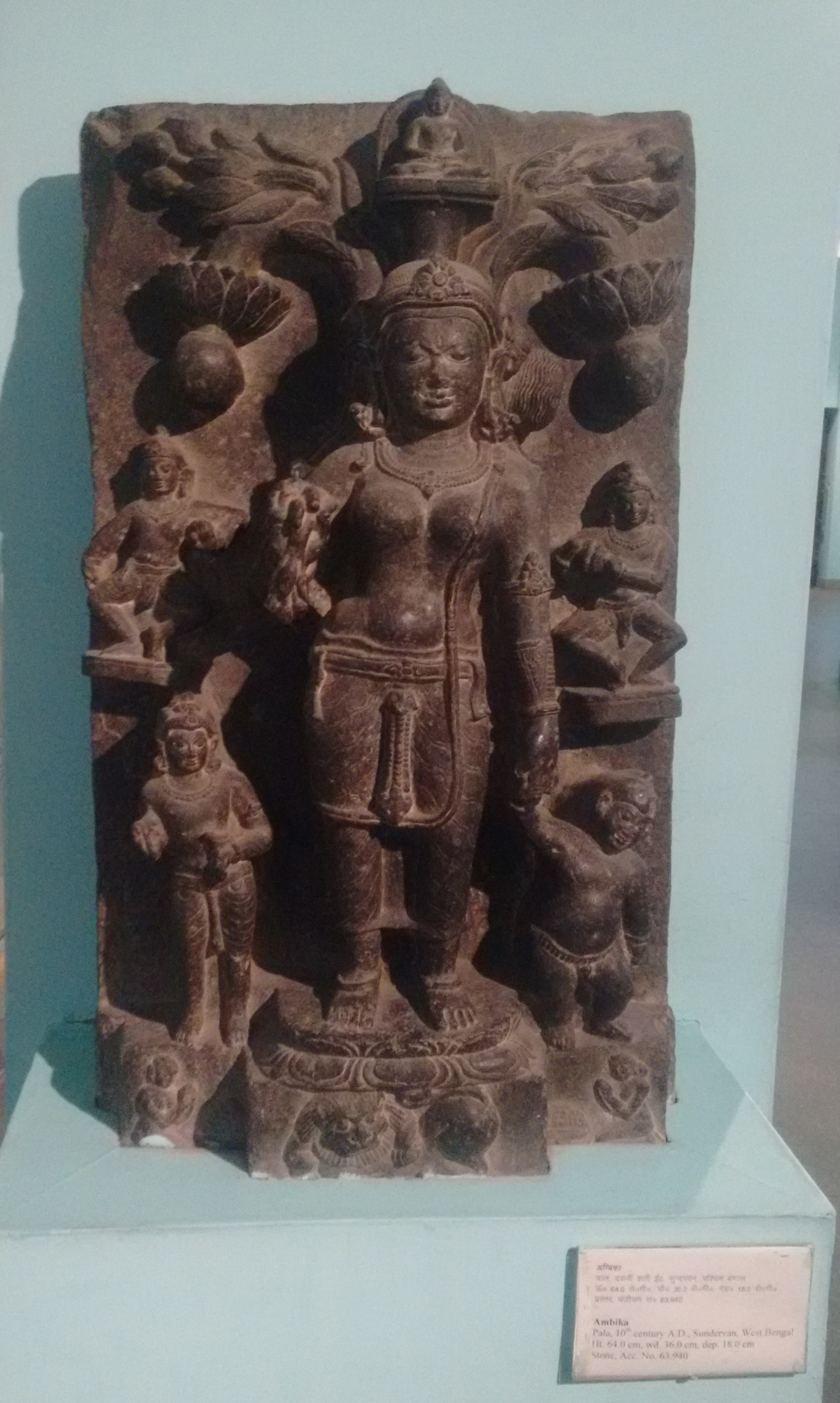
Goddess Ambika, 10th century

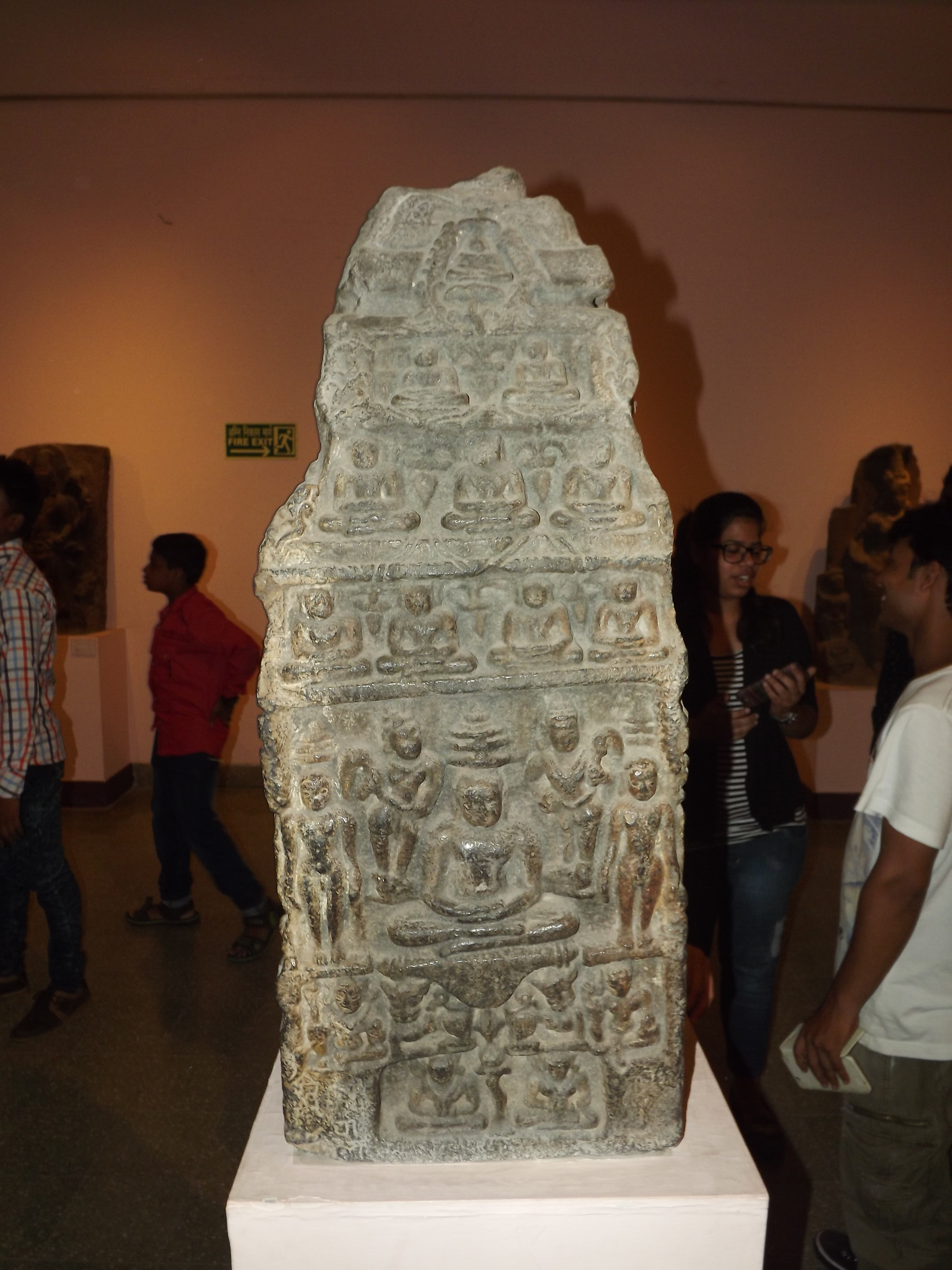
Jain Chaumukha Sculpture, 12th century

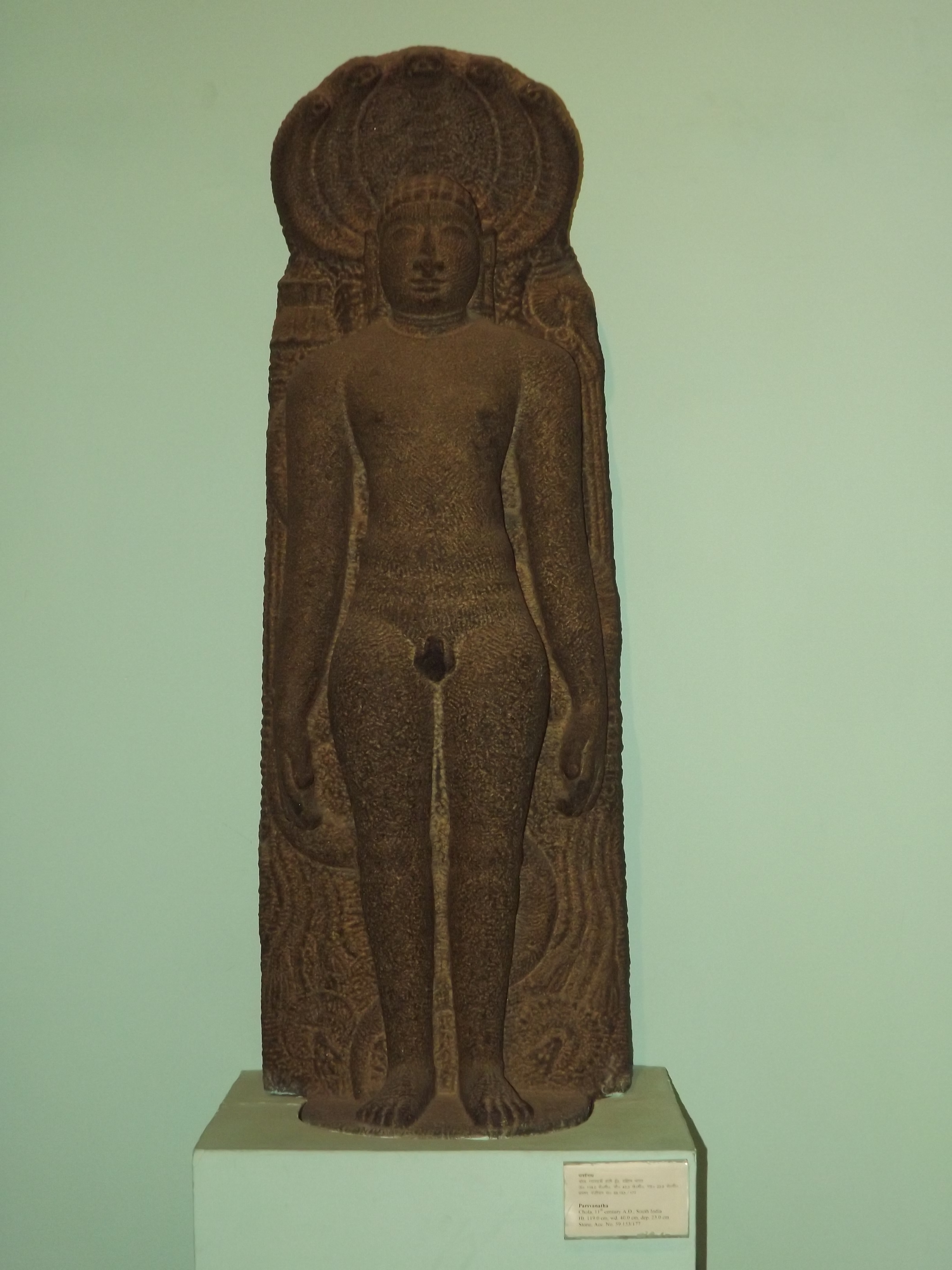
Parsvanatha (23rd Tirthankar), Chola dynasty, 11th century

=== Decorative Arts Gallery ===
The Decorative Arts collection at the National Museum is a reflection of lifestyles of the Indian people from the 16th to the 20th century. Decorative Arts refer to Arts concerned with the design and decoration of objects that are prized for their utility, rather than for their purely aesthetic qualities These include both utilitarian and decorative objects hand crafted by master-craftsmen. They help in understanding the social, religious, economical, commercial and technological development of Indian society. Ceramics, Pottery, Furniture, Textiles, Glassware, Metalware and Jewellery are a few included under Decorative Arts. The Decorative Arts section is divided into two galleries.

==== Decorative Arts Gallery 1 ====
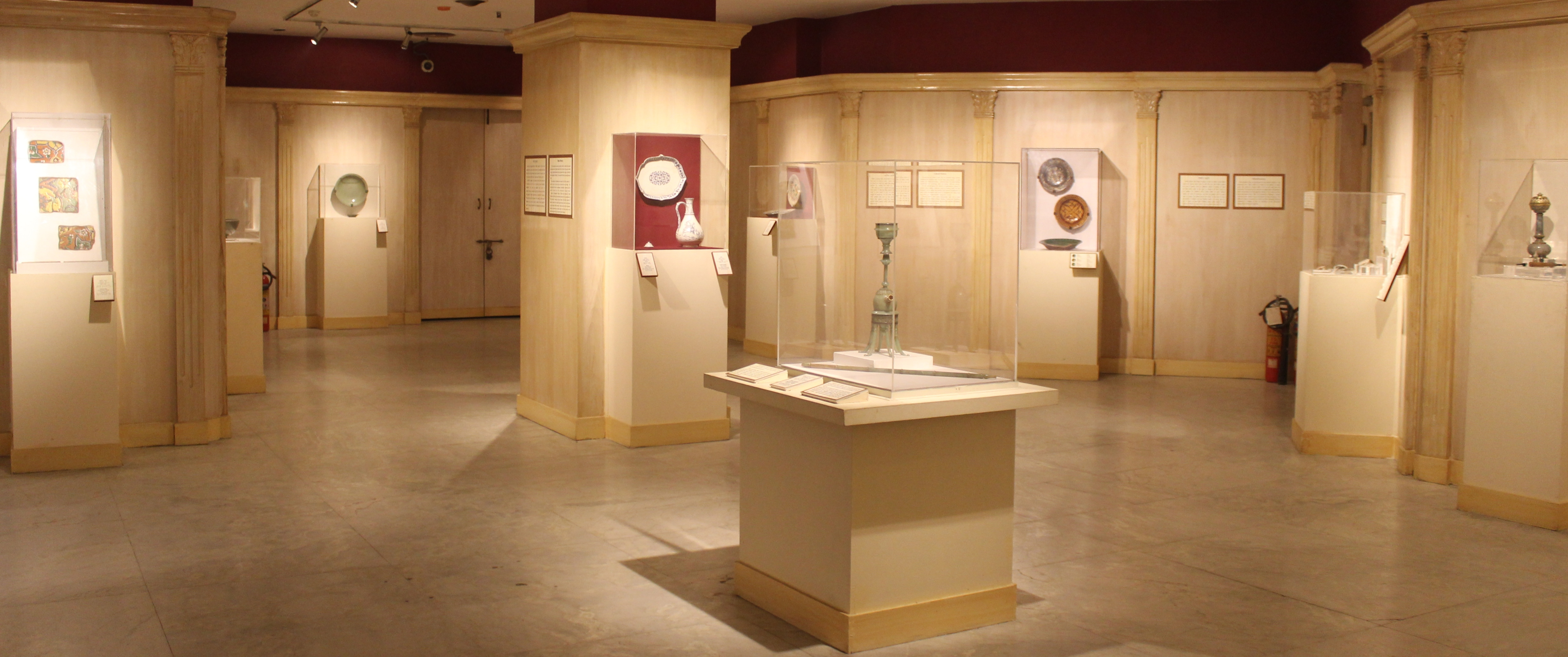
Decorative Arts gallery 1

This gallery gives a glimpses of three collections of the museum – Ivory, Jade and Ceramics. The Ivory group has several Hindu and Christian religious figures. The Jade section showcases the utilitarian objects, while the glazed tiles and blue-white pottery are in the Ceramic group. The gallery also has two interesting themes – Thrones of India, and Games and Leisure in the Past. The theme of thrones shows the evolution of the seat of power. From the low flat seats of antiquity to the modern armed chair, the journey of the throne is a fascinating story. An intricately carved Home Shrine and some metal Hindu and Jain pitikas (small seats for keeping idols for home shrines) are also present. The Jewel studded throne of the King of Varanasi is one of the best examples to show Power. The Games section has Rattles, Yo-Yo, Gamesman of Chess and Chaupar. Tops made of different materials with different designs are also exhibited. These artifacts combine the aesthetic and artistic elements to everyday objects used for games. The Jade Collection of the museum has interesting objects from the Mughal period.

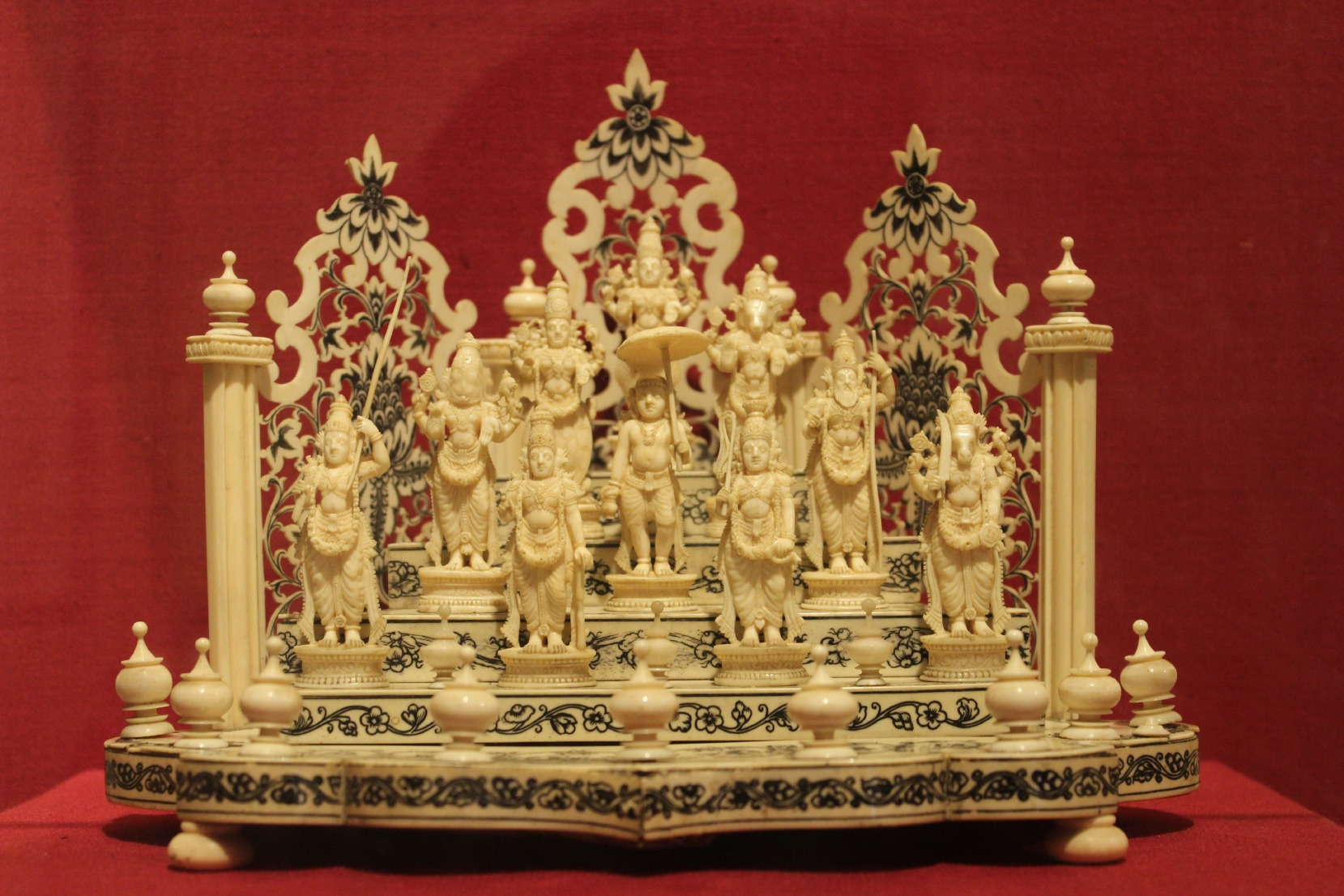
Main Article: Ivory Carved Dashavatara Shrine.

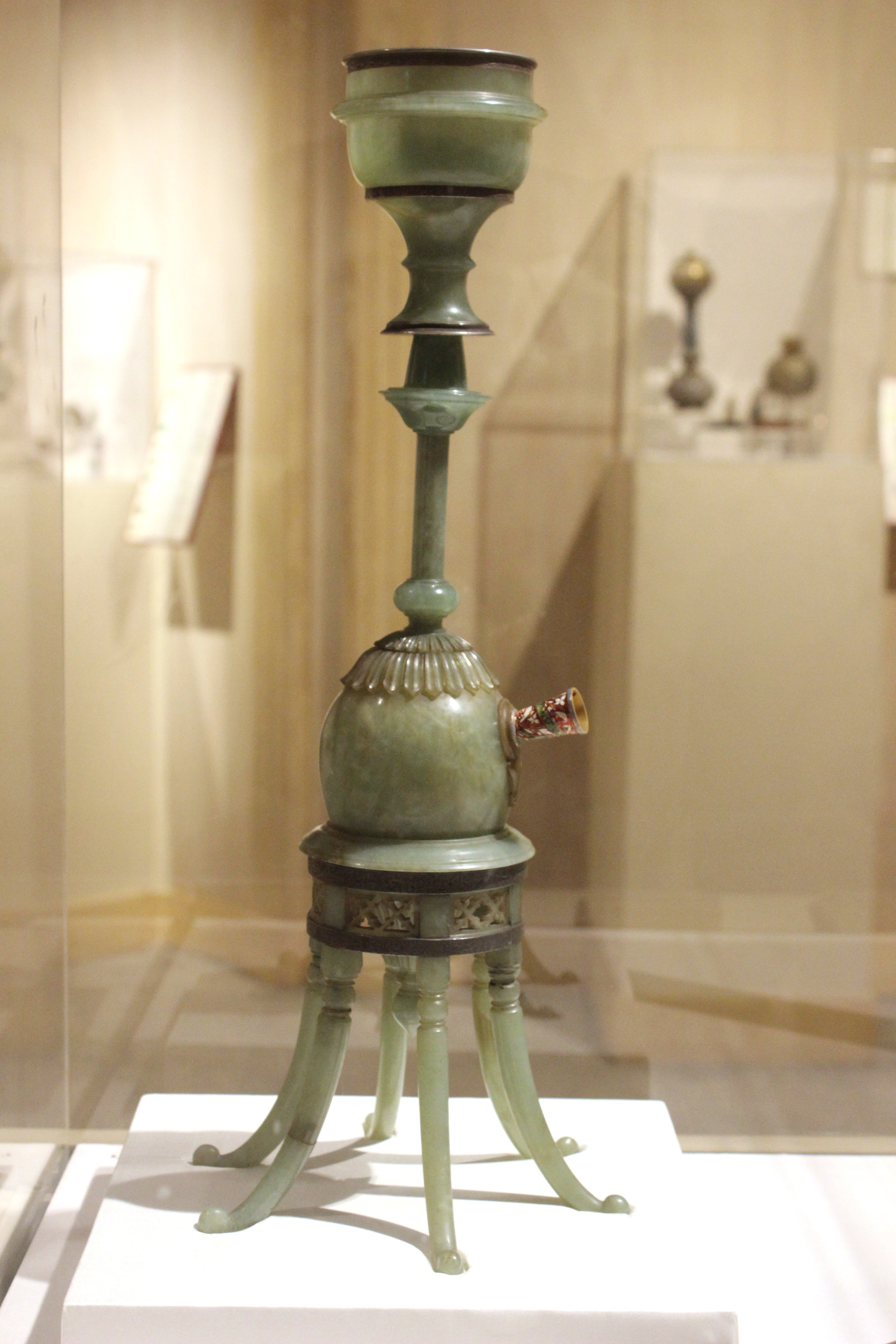
Jahangir's Jade hookah.

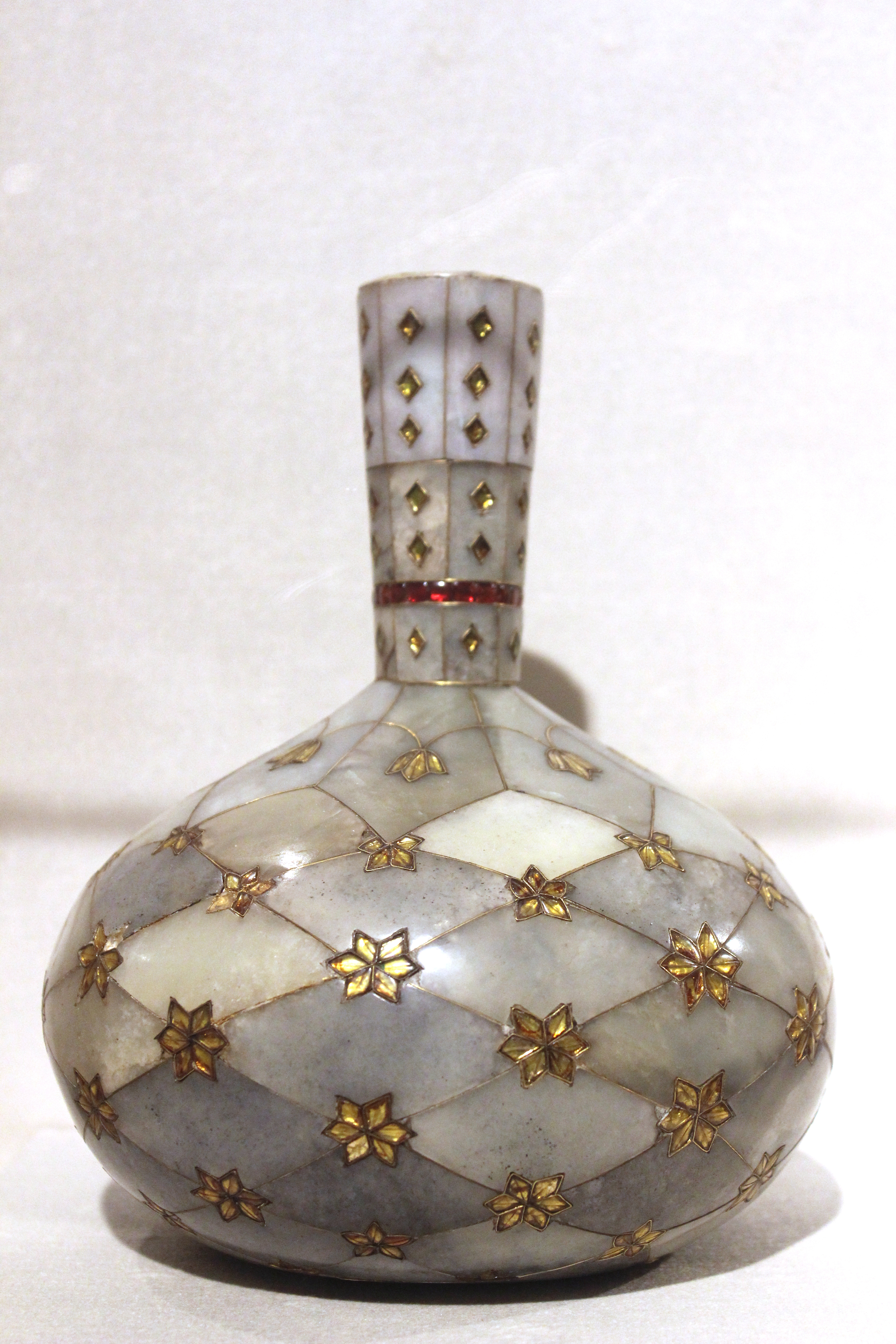
Jade Surahi (flask) from Mughal era

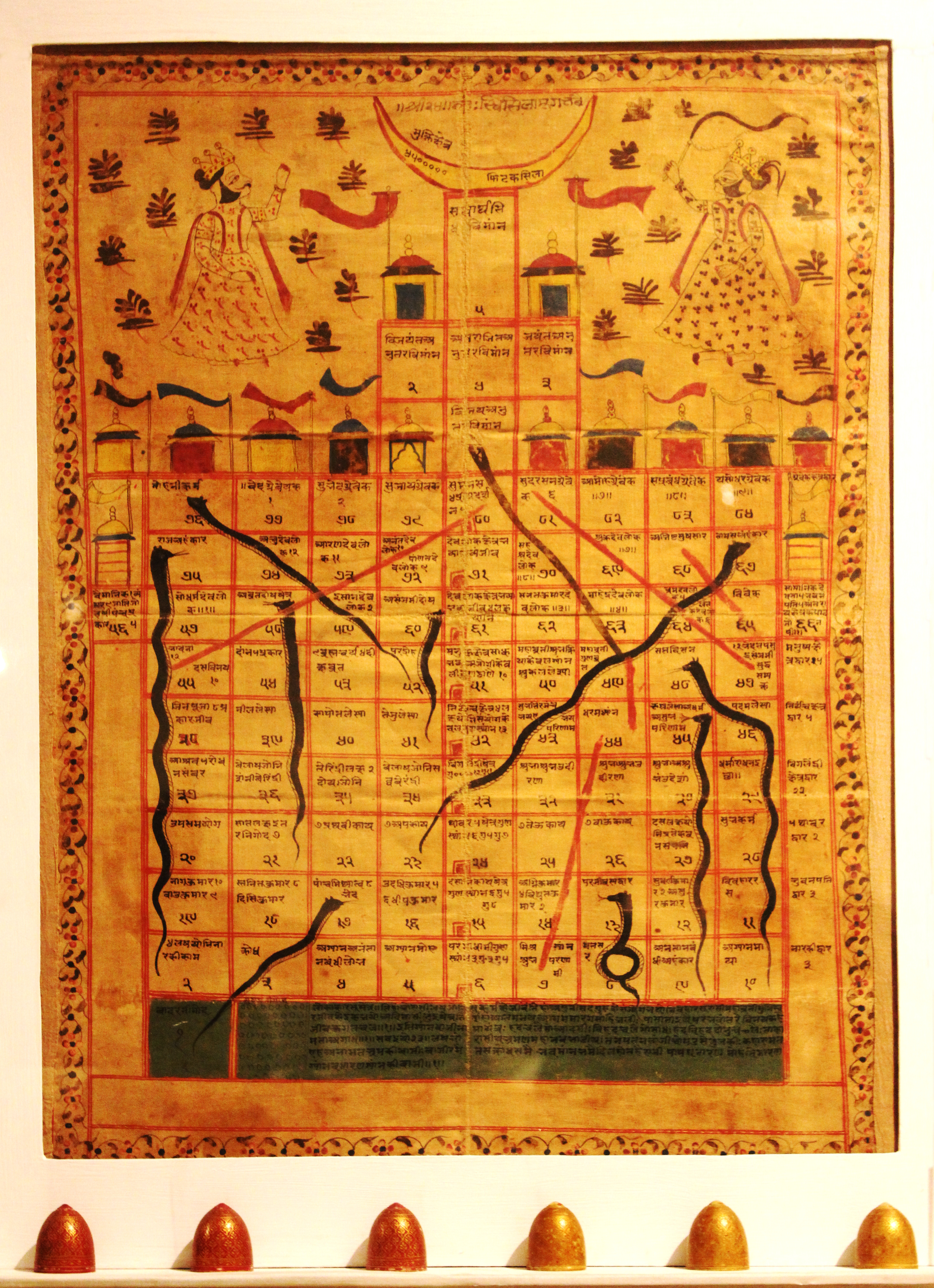
Gyan chauper.

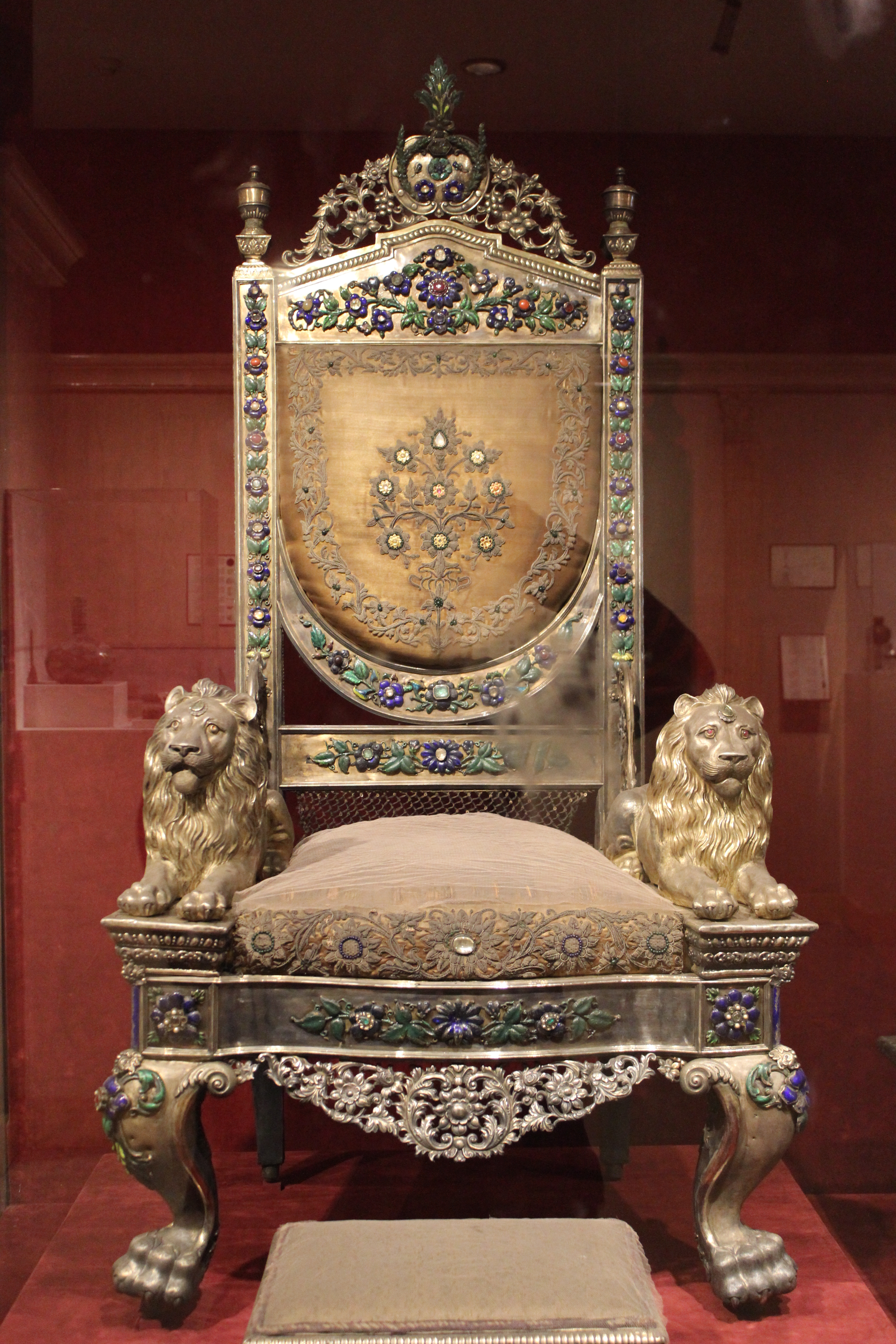
Throne of the Raja of Varanasi

==== Decorative Arts Gallery 2 ====
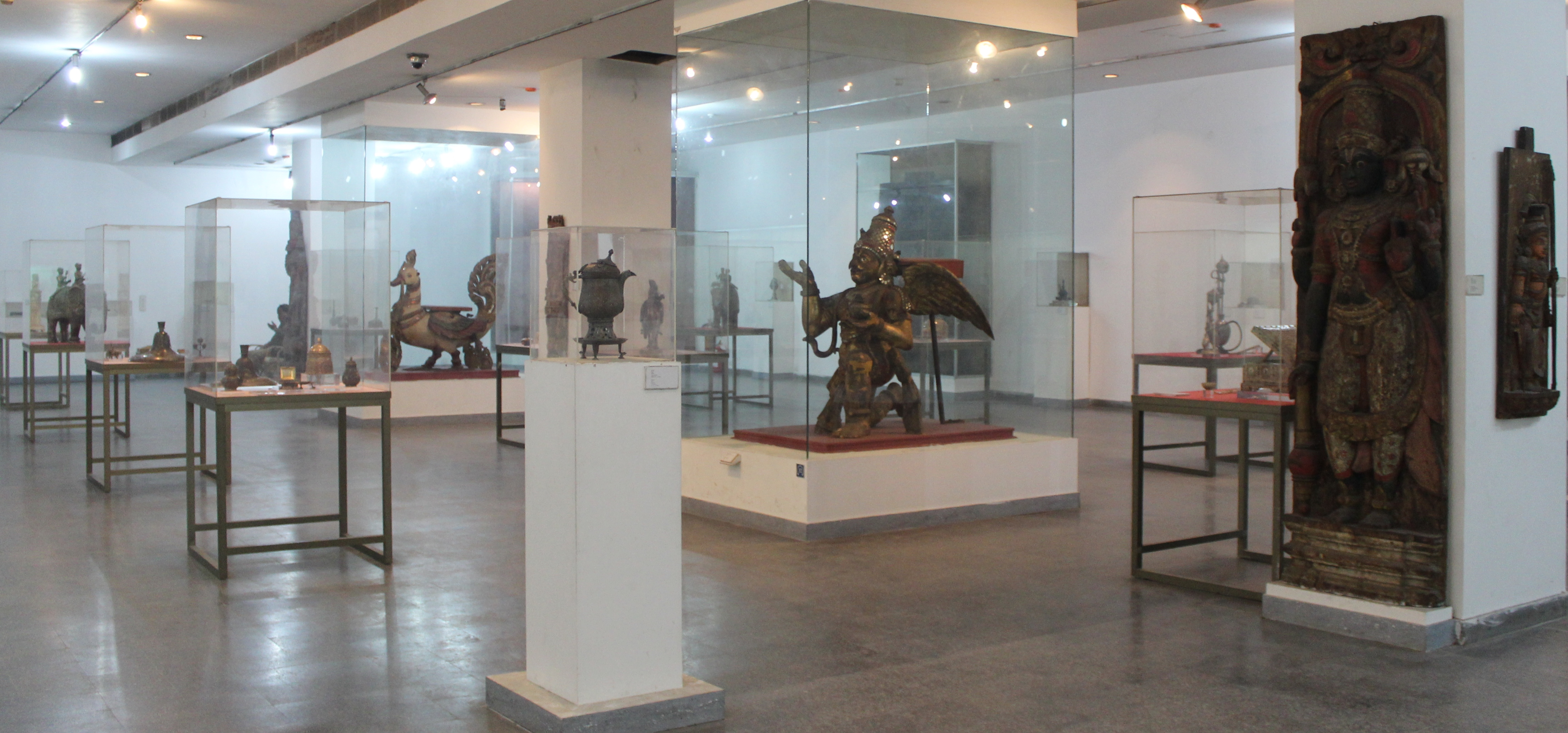
Decorative Arts gallery 2

This gallery has artifacts from the proto-historic period to the present day. The variety, quality and media did increase with the taste and status of different generations and the process is on even today. This gallery exhibits Metalware, Jewellery and Wooden objects. Most notable among the wooden objects are the Vahana on display.

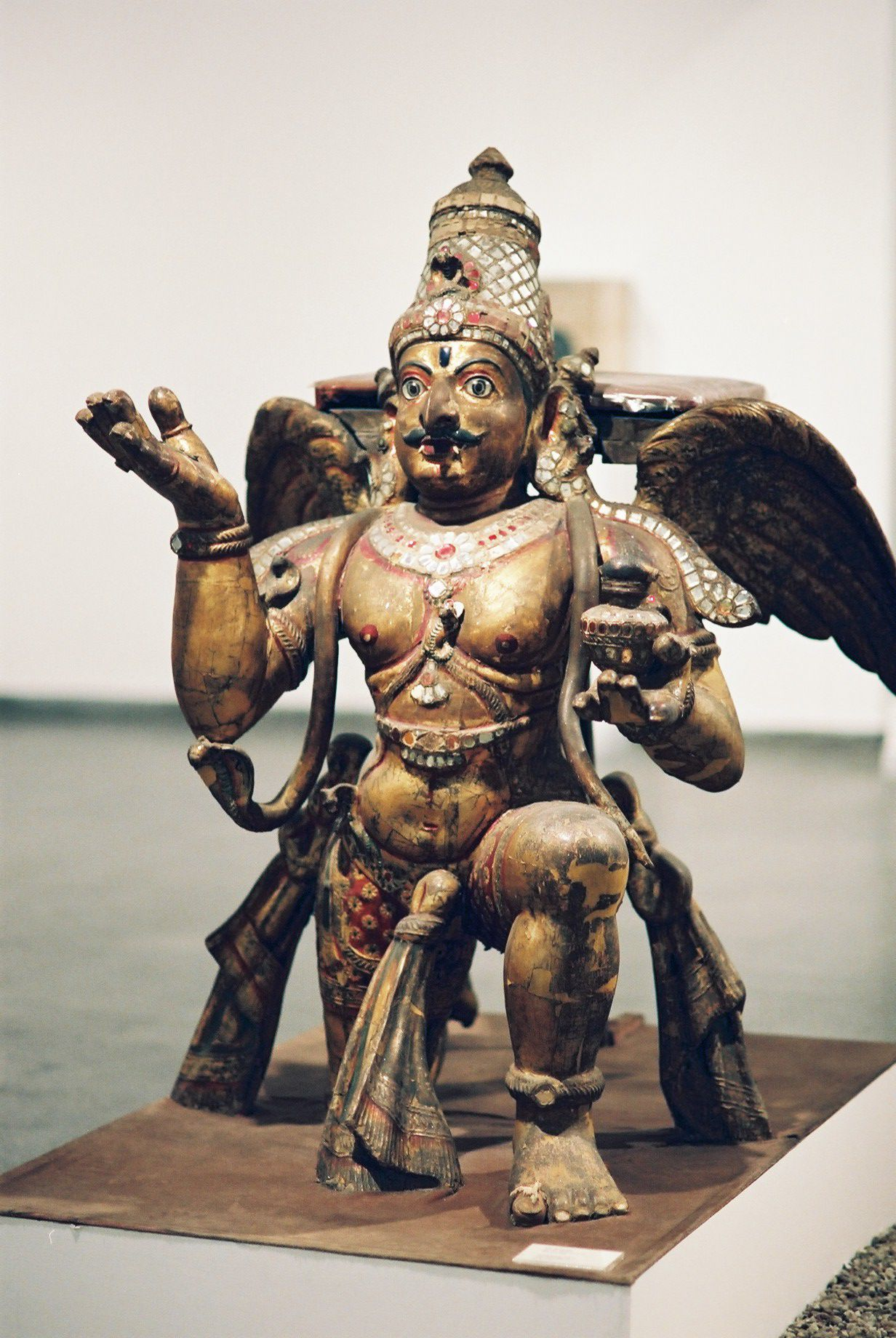
Wooden Garuda Vahana (mount) from Tamil Nadu

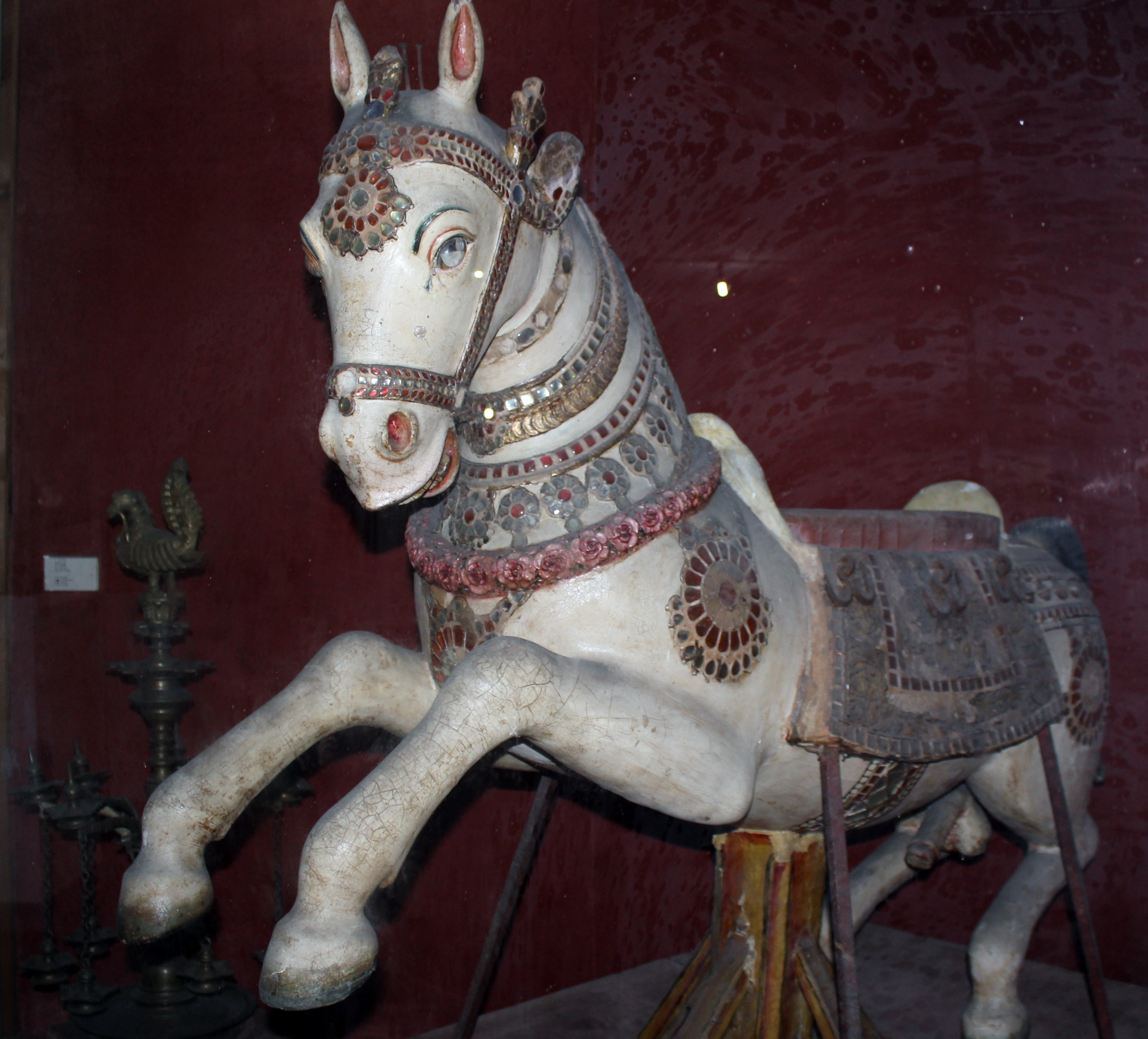
Wooden Horse (Vahana from Tanjore)

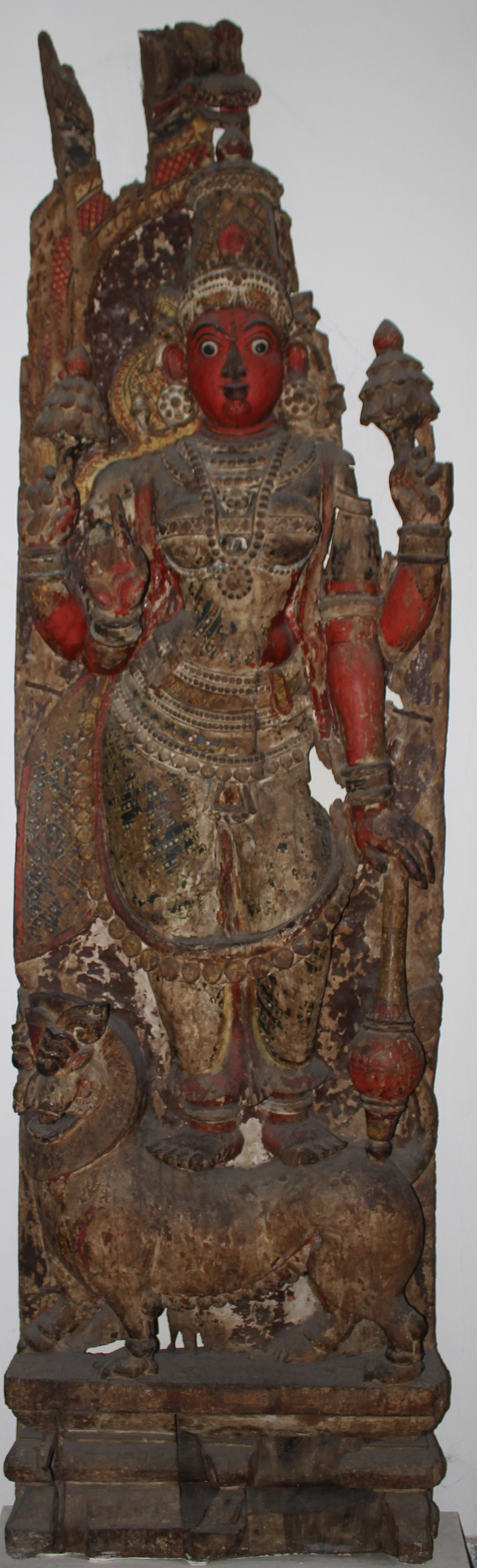
Dwarpala

=== Miniature Paintings Gallery ===
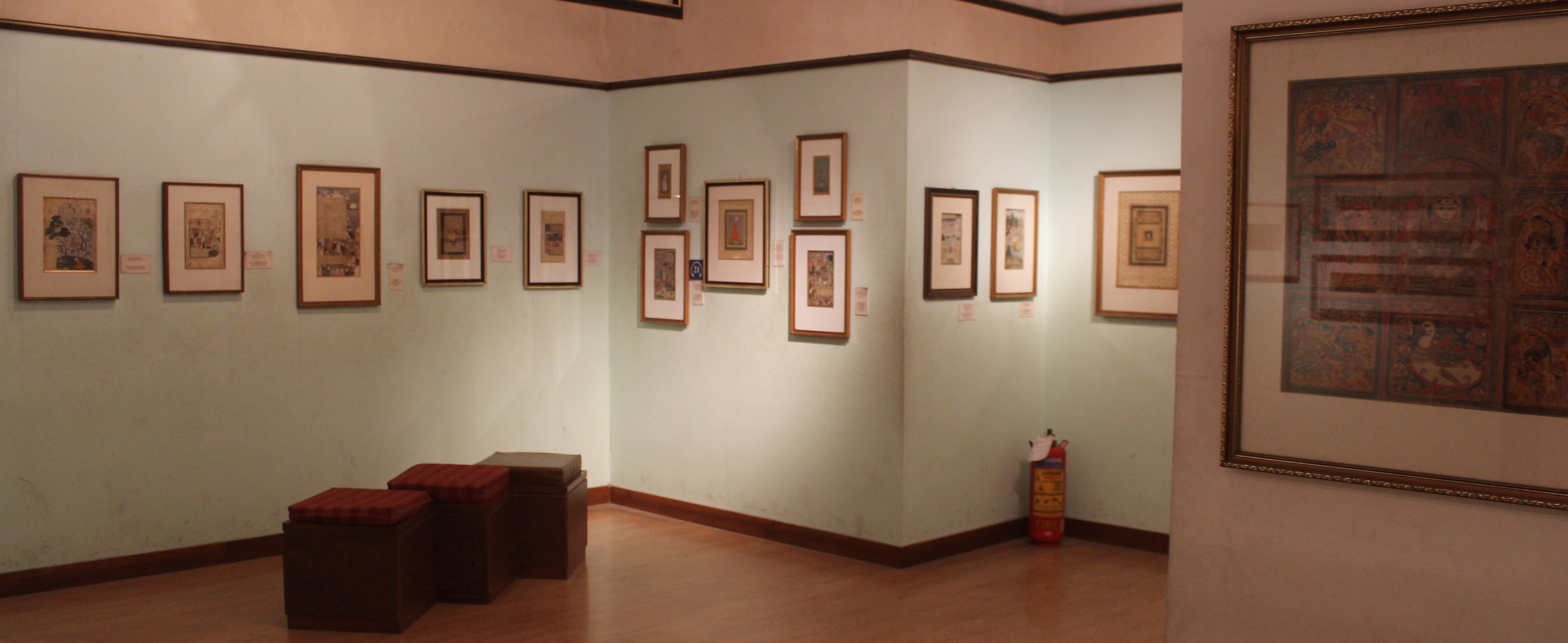
View of the Mughal Miniature paintings section

Miniature paintings, on paper, cloth, bark, wood and ivory, forms one of the National Museum's most prestigious collections, and the world's largest. There are over 17,000 paintings in the Department of Painting in the National Museum, spanning 900 years and most stylistic formats to be found in India: Pala, early Jain style, Sultanate, the indigenous styles of Malwa, Mewar, Bundelkhand, Raghogarh, Mughal, Deccani, later Rajasthani, Pahari, Sikh, Jammu, Tanjore and Mysore, and the Company School paintings.

==== Mughal Miniature Paintings ====
Miniature painting flourished during Mughal rule. Emperor Jahangir and Shahjahan were great patrons of art. In their courts, the painters adopted themes ranging from portraitures to landses, durbar scenes and processions for their works. The Deccani style was a fusion of Islamic idiom with indigenous art styles and of local classical traditions with elements of Persian and European Renaissance.

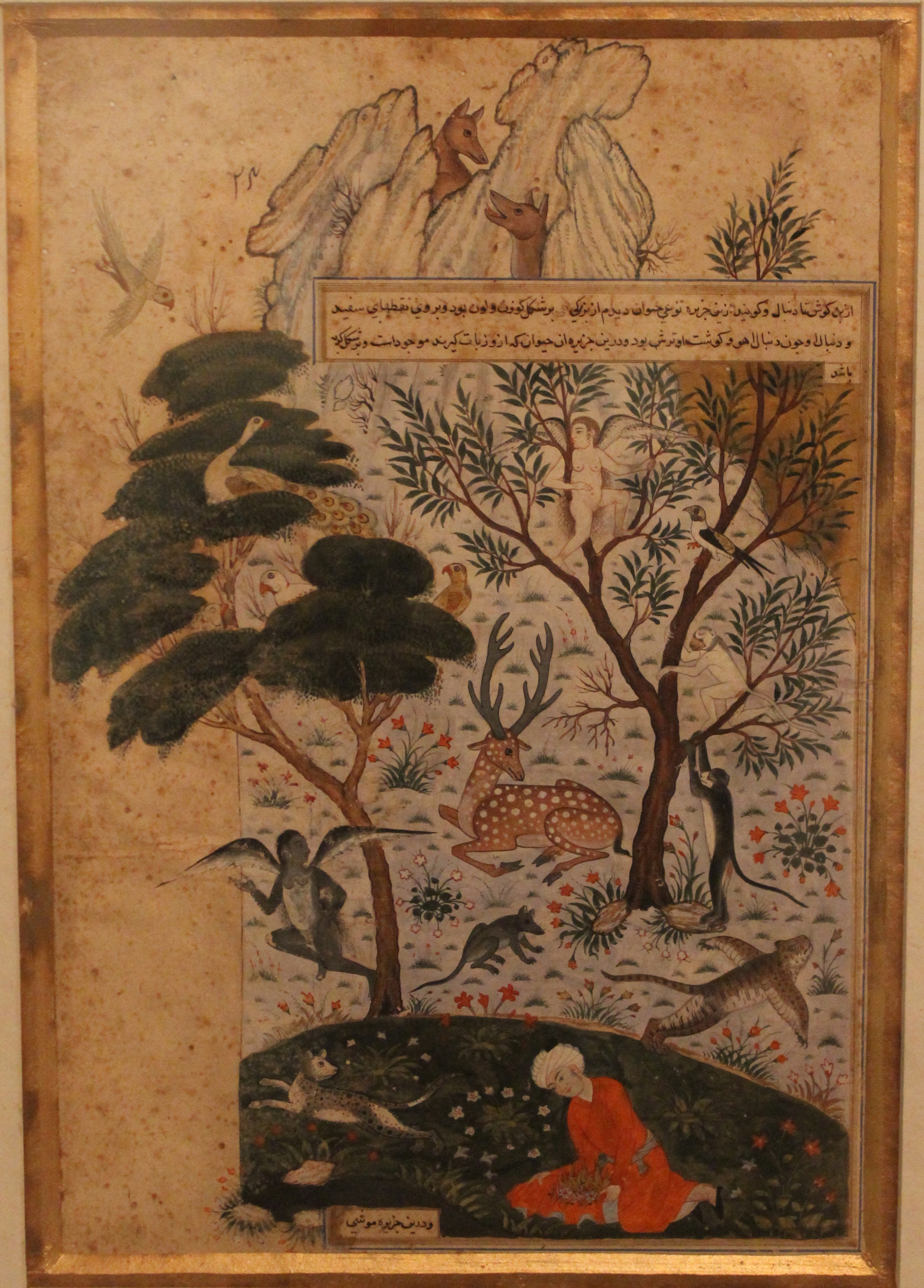
Nature Study (Early Mughal)

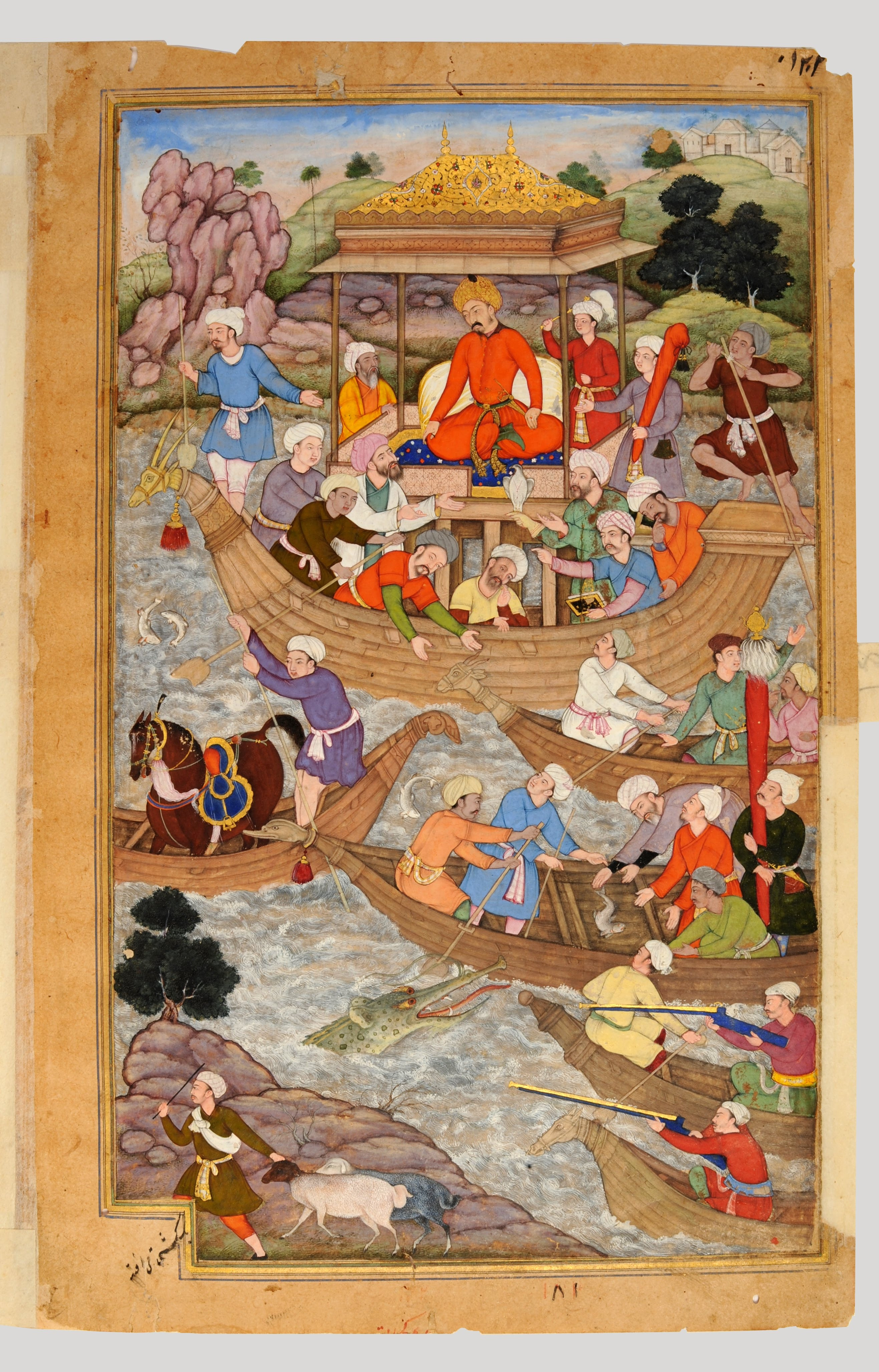
Babur crossing the River Saun by Jaganath, Folio from a Baburnama, 1598

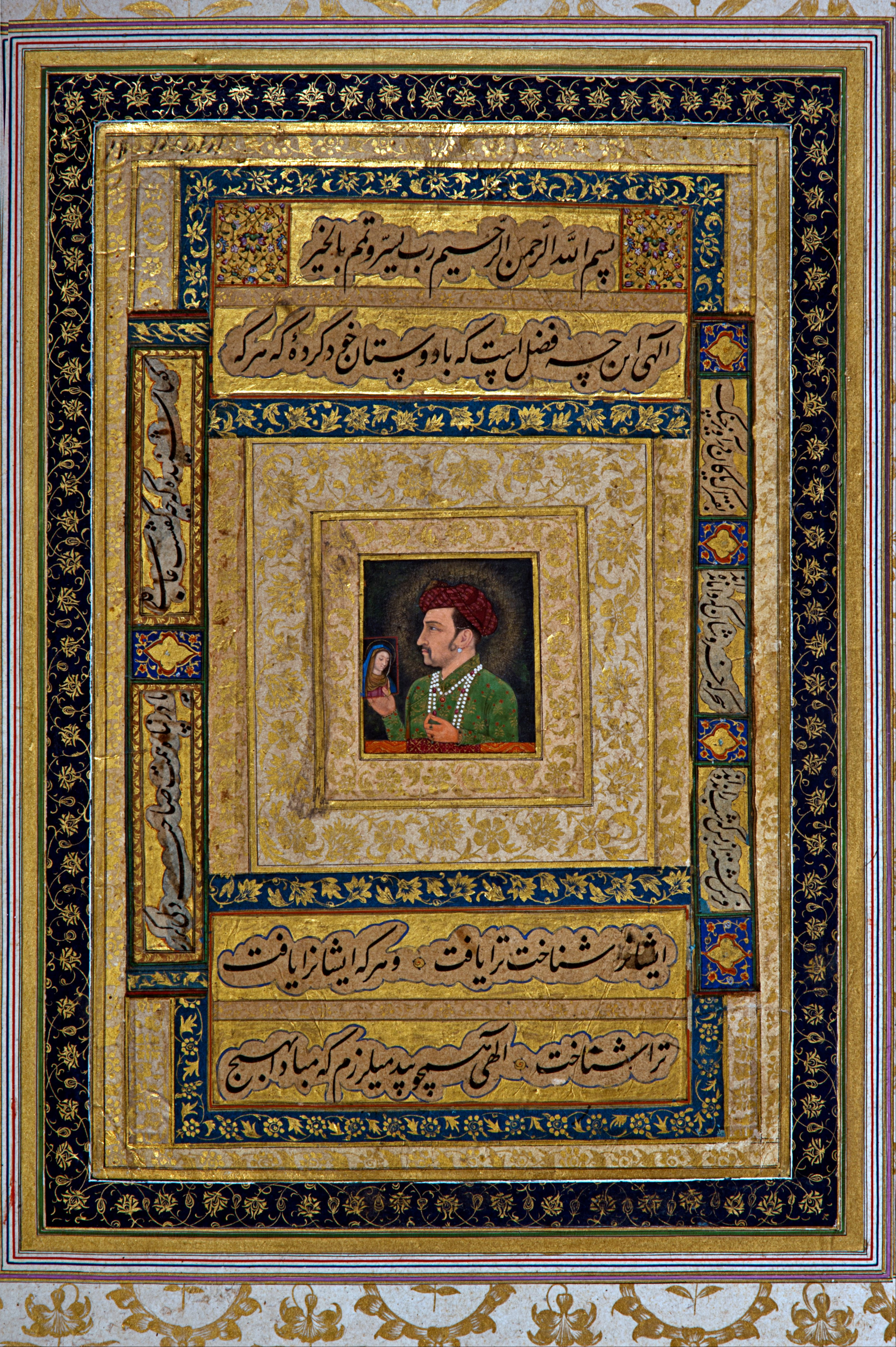
Jahangir holding a picture of Madonna, c. 1620

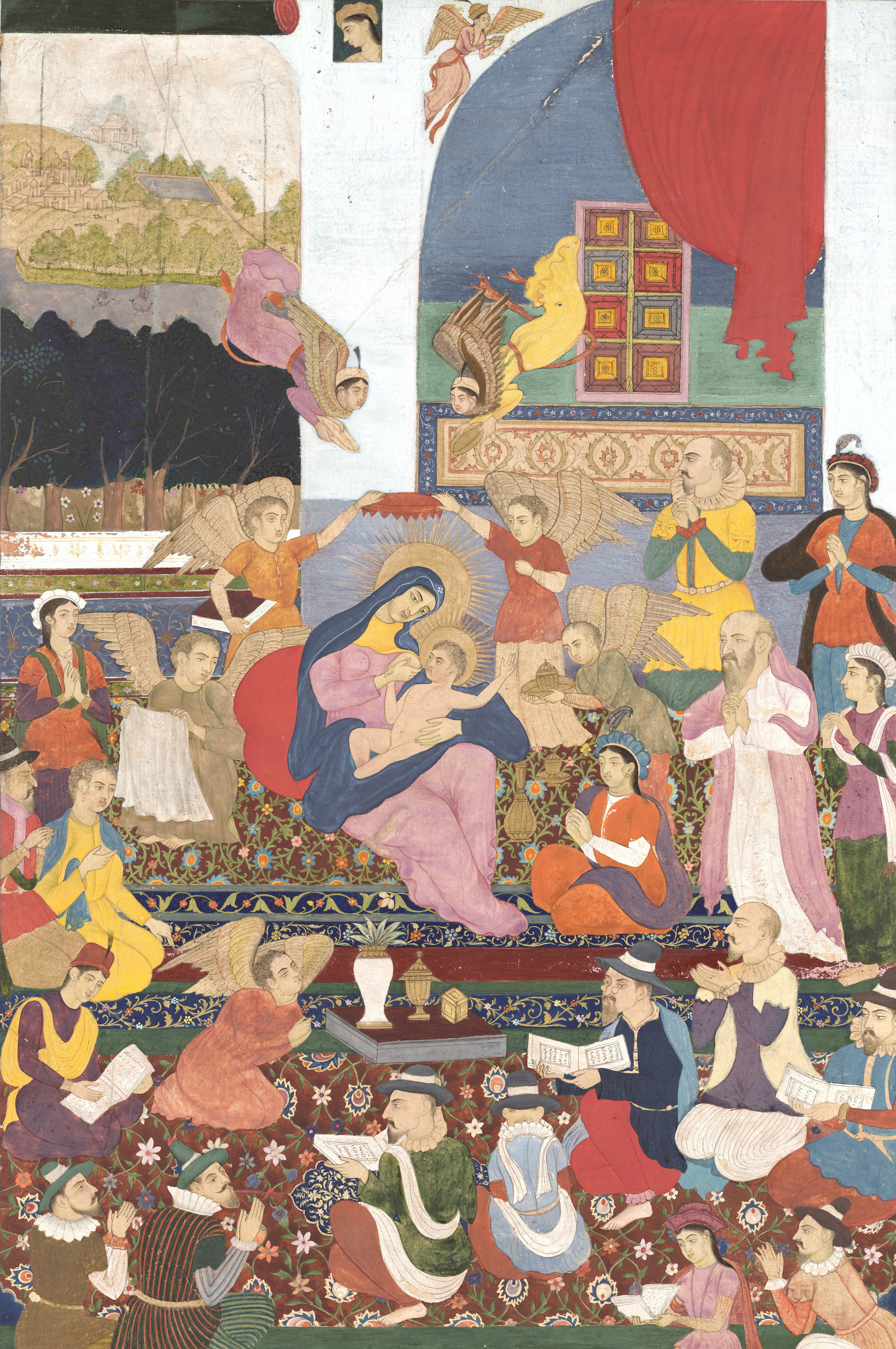
Nativity, c. 1720-1725

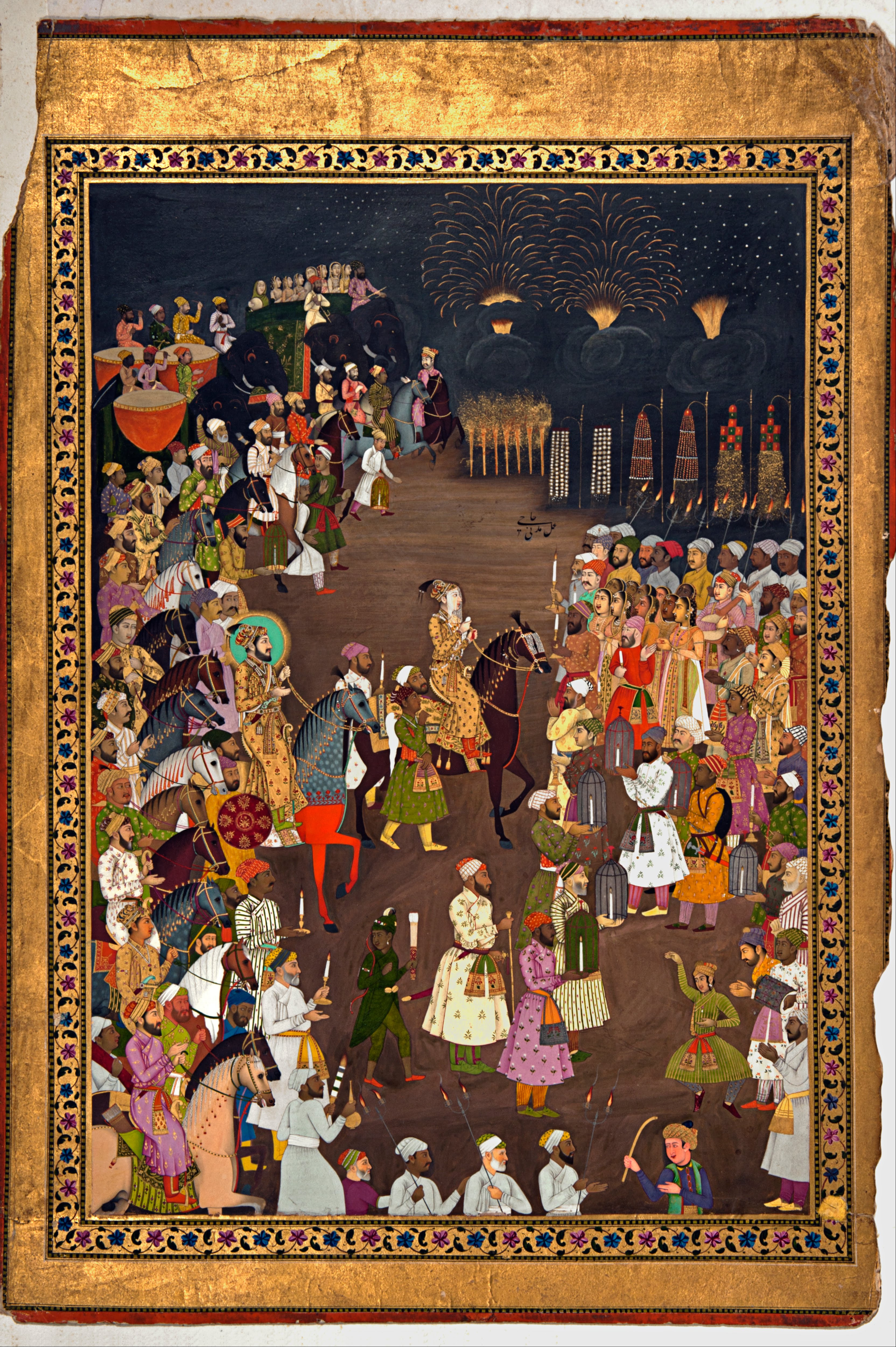
Marriage procession of Dara Shikoh, c. 1740-1750

==== Central India Miniature Paintings ====
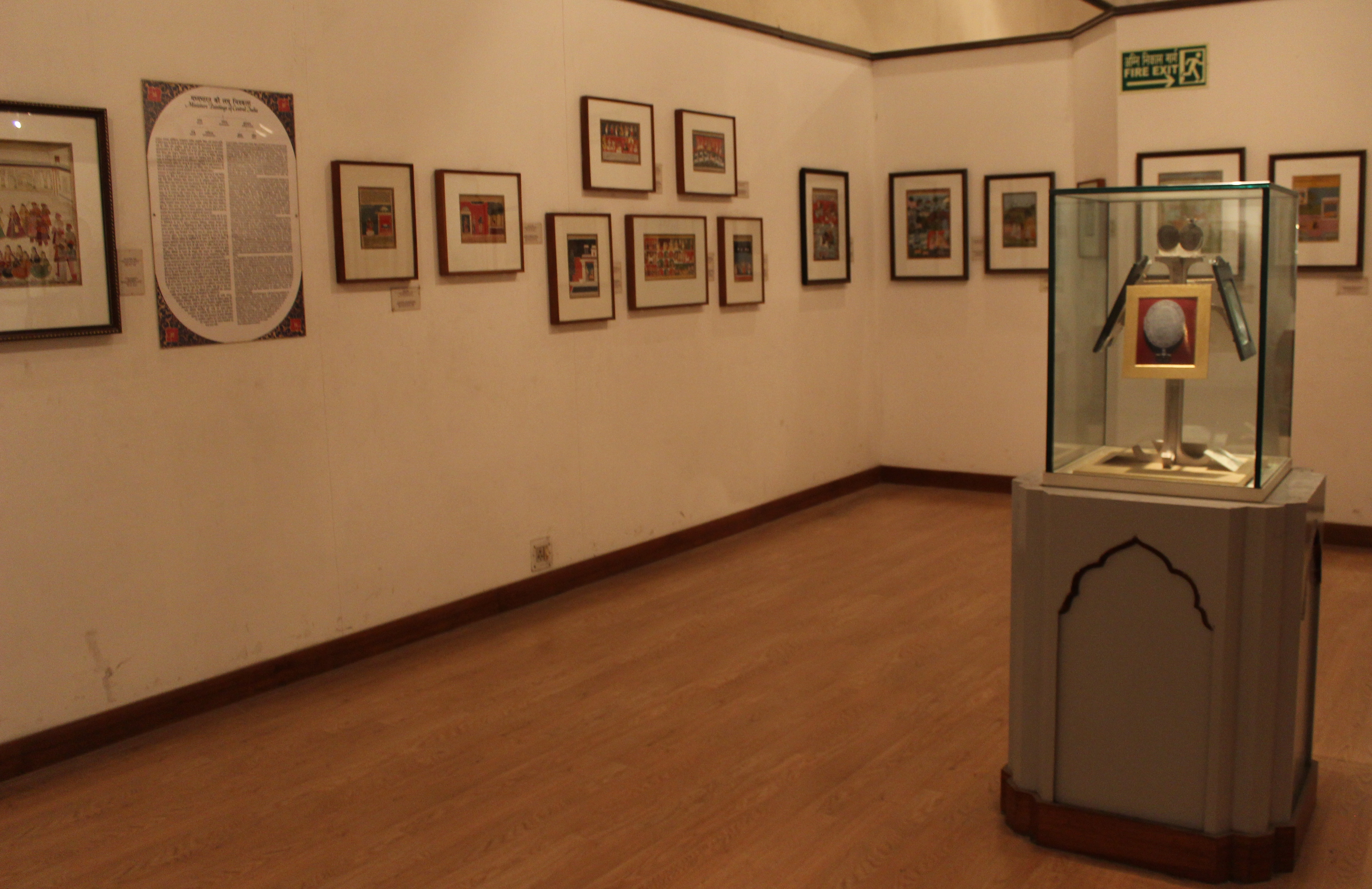
A view of the Central India Paintings Sections

Paintings from Central India include miniatures from Malwa and Bundelkhand.

==== Rajasthan Miniature Paintings ====
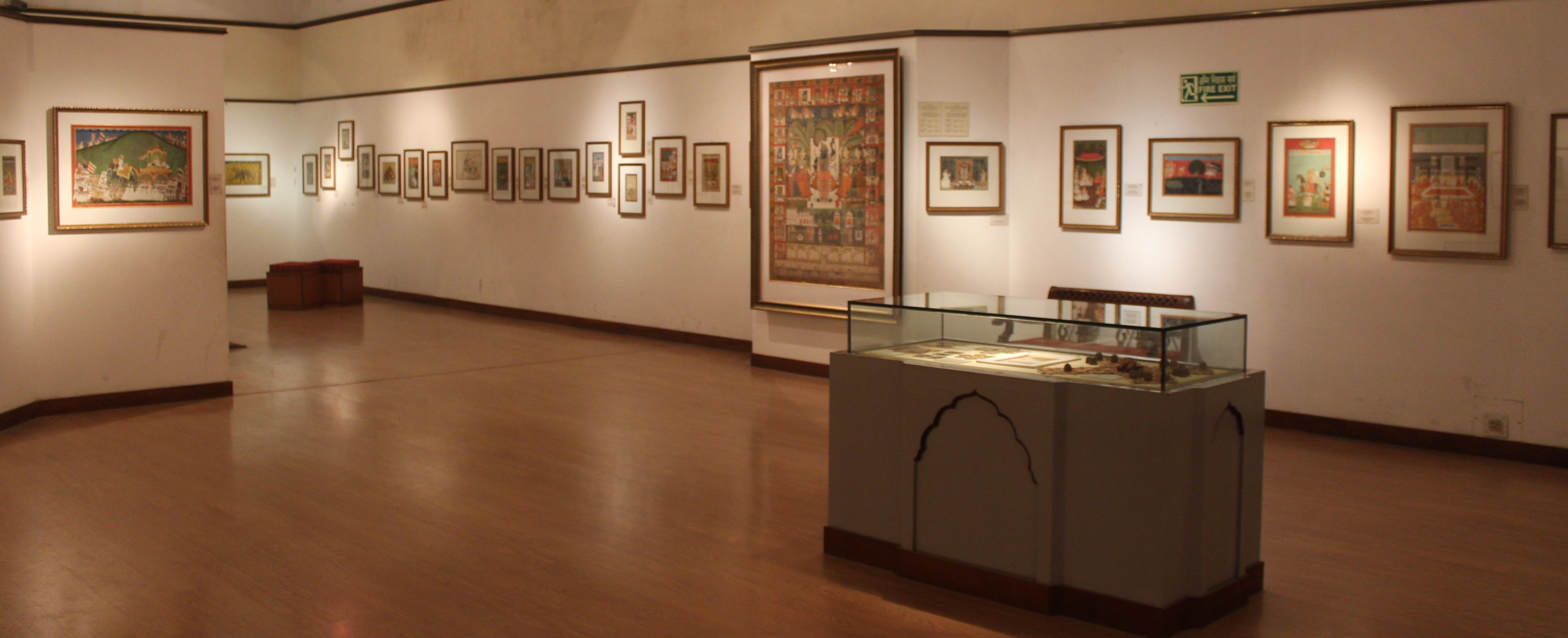
A view of the Rajasthani Paintings Sections

Rajasthani Miniatures flourished mainly in Mewar, Bundi, Kota, Kishangarh, Jaipur, Jodhpur and Bikaner.

Mewar Miniatures are illustrating Hindu mythological themes. Bundi and Kota Miniatures excel in composition compactness. Hunting scenes are Kota's speciality. Bikaner excels in Portraiture. Kishangarh is known for its Bani Thani, which portrays the model of an idealised and elegant woman.

==== Pahari Miniature Paintings ====
Pahari schools flourished mainly at Basohli, Chamba, Guler and Kangra. Under the patronage of Maharaja Sansar Chand in the late 18th and early 19th centuries, Kangra became the most prominent centre for the Pahari style.

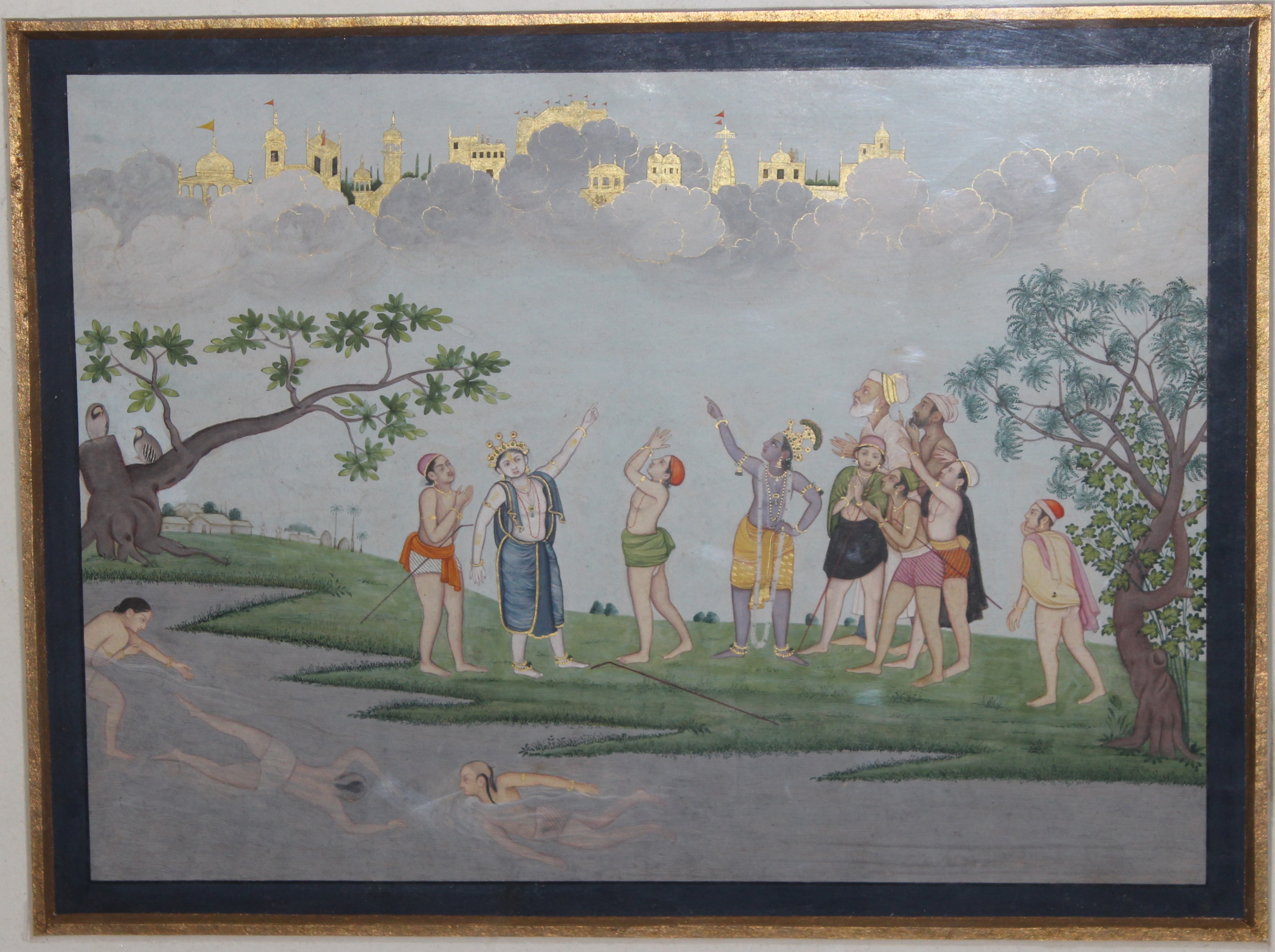
Nanda and other Cowherds moving to Vrindavana (Based on the story of the Bhagvata-Purana)

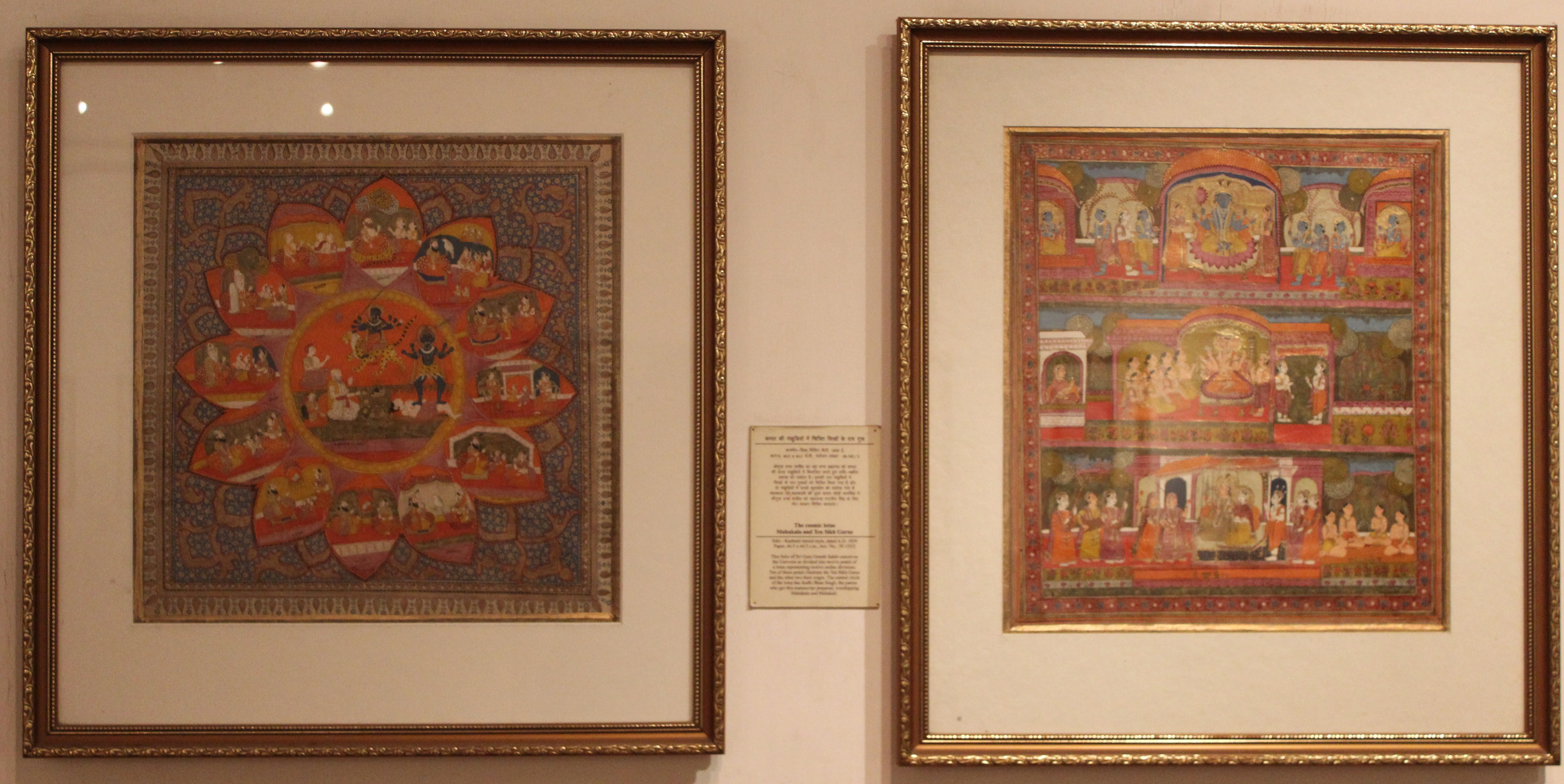
Illustration of Guru Granth Sahib

=== Buddhist Artifacts Gallery ===
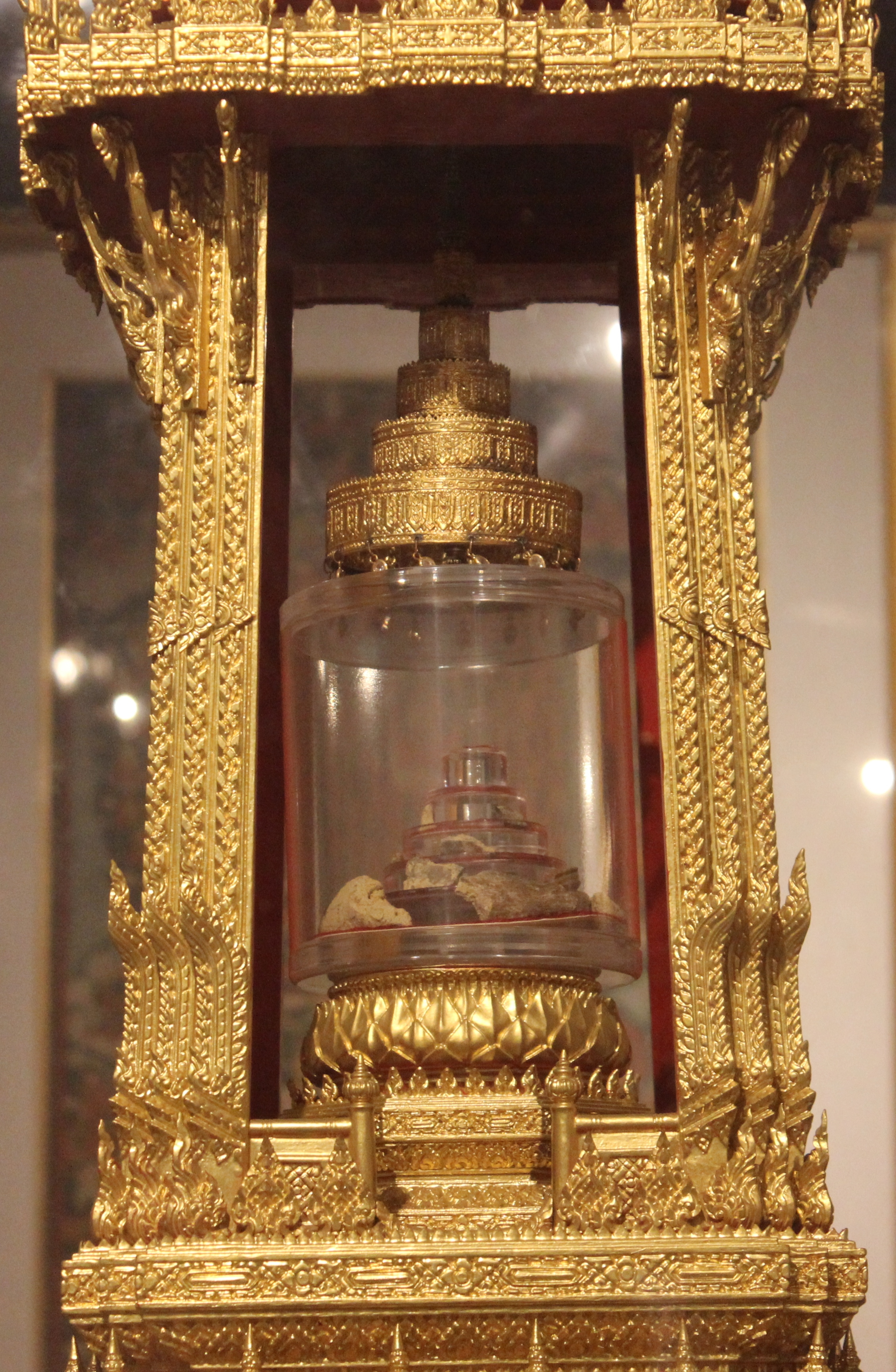
Buddha's relics in the museum

The Buddhist Art Section is mostly known for the sacred relics of Buddha (5th–4th century BC) unearthed from Piprahwa, Siddharthnagar district, in Uttar Pradesh, which yielded caskets with fragments of bone, along with ornaments, figures and precious stones. The inscription on a casket speaks of the relics of Buddha. The Archaeological Survey of India conducted further excavations at the site from 1971 to 1977, resulting in the discovery of two more caskets in soapstone, containing more sacred bone relics. The site has been identified with ancient Kapilavastu, the home town of Buddha Sakyamuni. Outstanding specimens of Buddhist Art is illustrated through exhibits in Stone, Bronze, Terracota, Stucco, Wooden Sculptures & Painted Scrolls or Thangkas from Nepal, Tibet, Central Asia, Myanmar, Java and Cambodia which represents the three principal Buddhist forms – Hinayana, Mahayana and Vajrayana. These objects stimulate a sense of Devotion, Dedication and Love for Humanity.

Key highlights of the collection include:

- Adoration of Stupa, Nagarjunkonda, Pale Green Limestone, 3rd century AD
- Standing Buddha, Kushana, Dark grey schist stone, 2nd–3rd century AD
- Laughing Boy Head, Kushana, Stucco, 3rd–4th century AD
- Scenes from Buddha’s Life, Gupta, Sarnath, Chunar sandstone, 5th century AD
- Buddha Head, Gupta, Sarnath, Buff Chunar sandstone, 5th century AD
- Standing Buddha, Pala, Nalanda, Bronze, 10th century AD
- Elephants carrying Buddha’s Relics, Sunga, Bharhut, Red sandstone, 2nd century BC
- Sacred Relics from Kapilavastu, Piprahwa, Spotted red sandstone, 5th–4th century BC

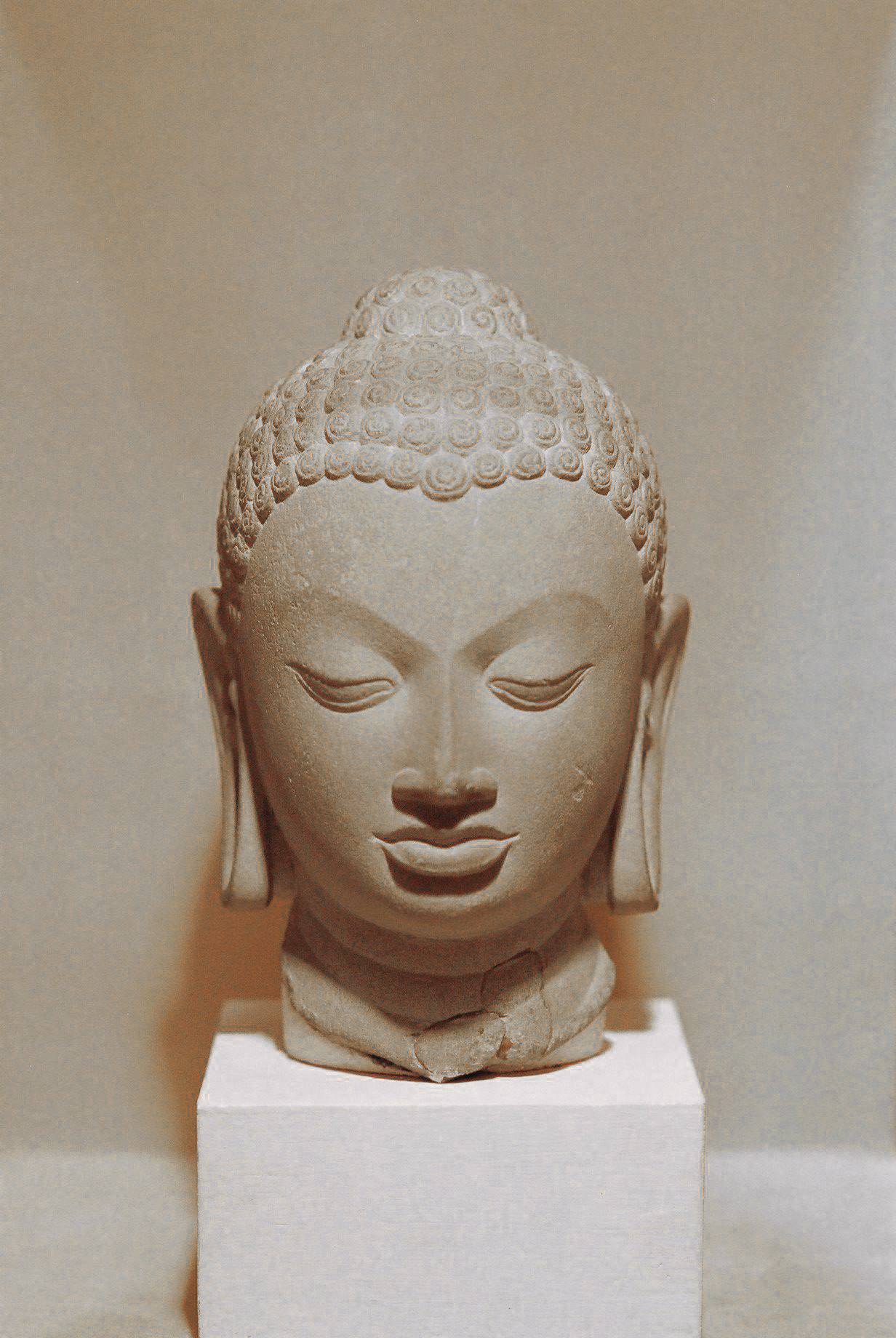
Head of Buddha

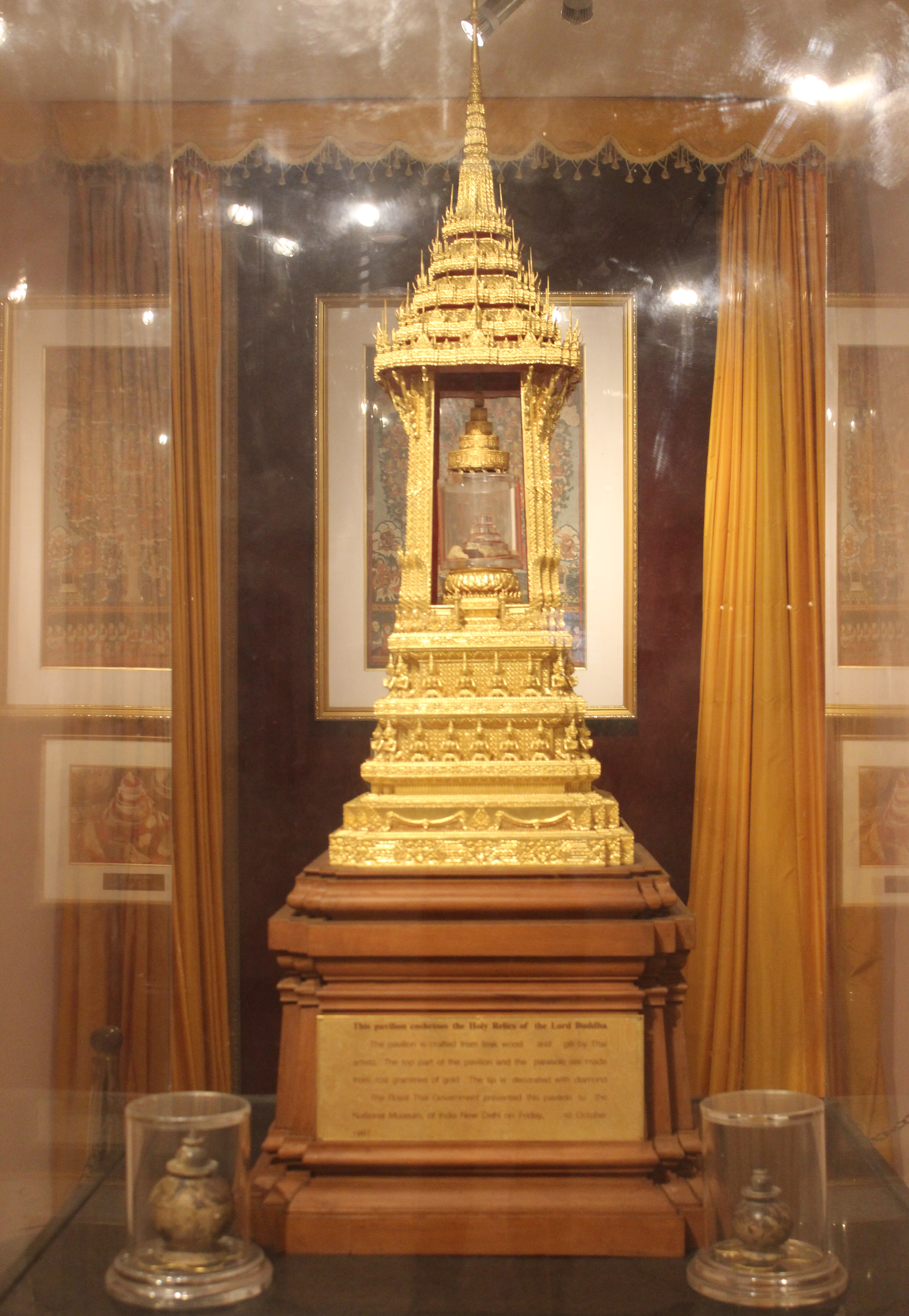
Buddha's relics, from a stupa built by Emperor Ashoka in the 3rd century BCE.

=== Evolution of Indian Scripts and Coins Gallery ===
In this gallery, there are many large sized well-lit transparencies on show which are narrating the development of various Indian Scripts and Coins.

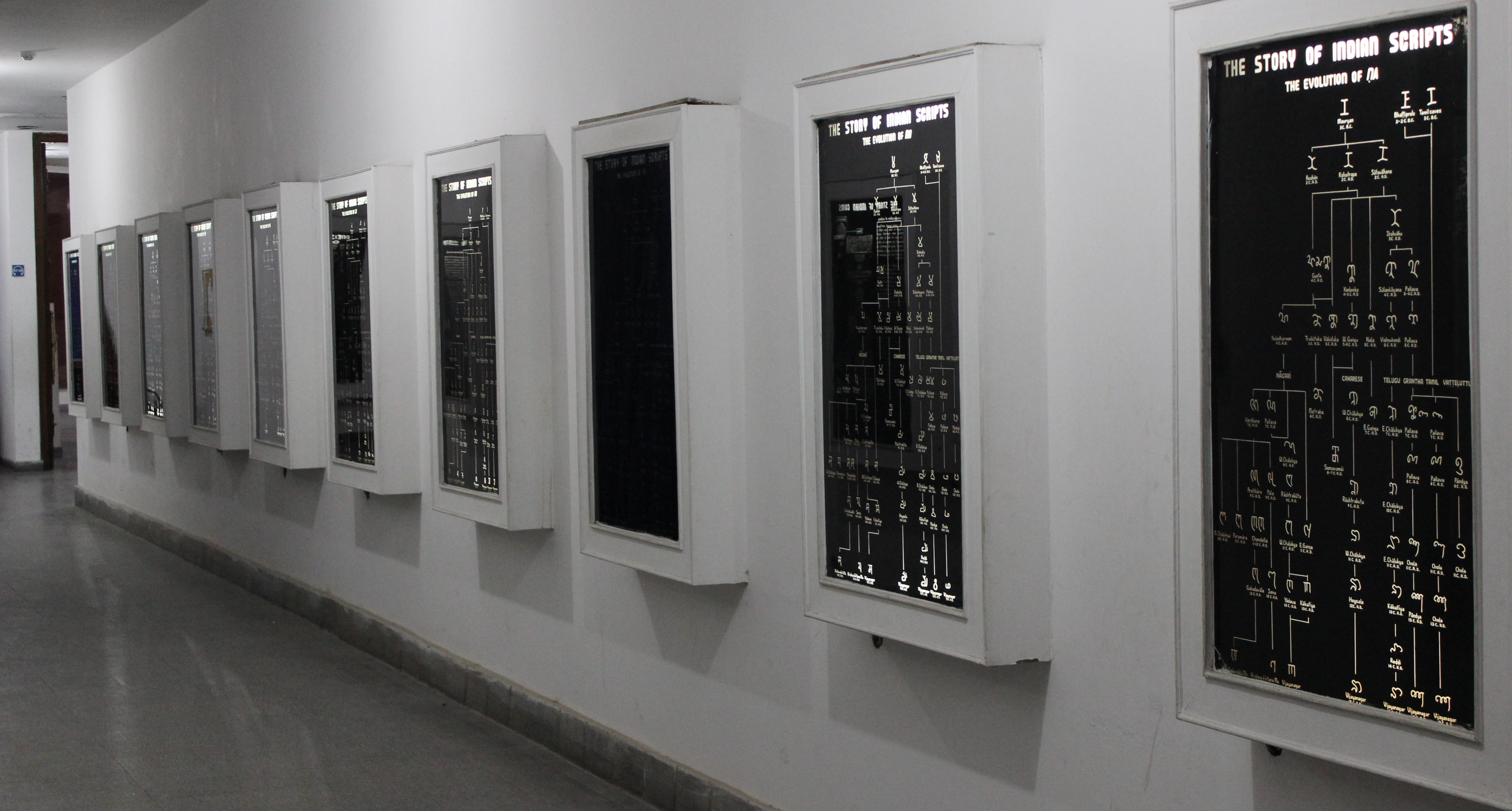
Inside the Galleries of National Museum, New Delhi

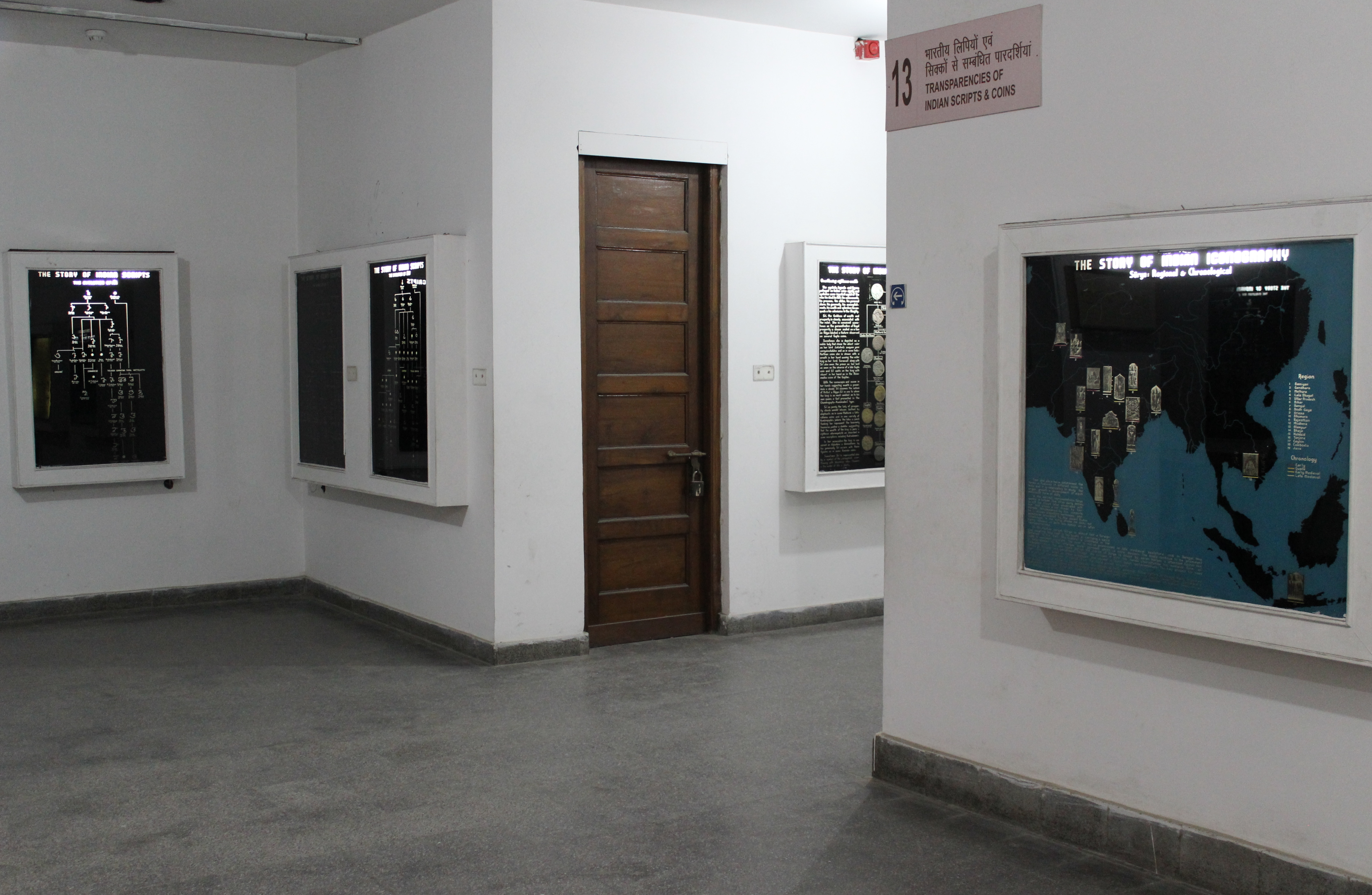
Inside the Galleries of National Museum, New Delhi

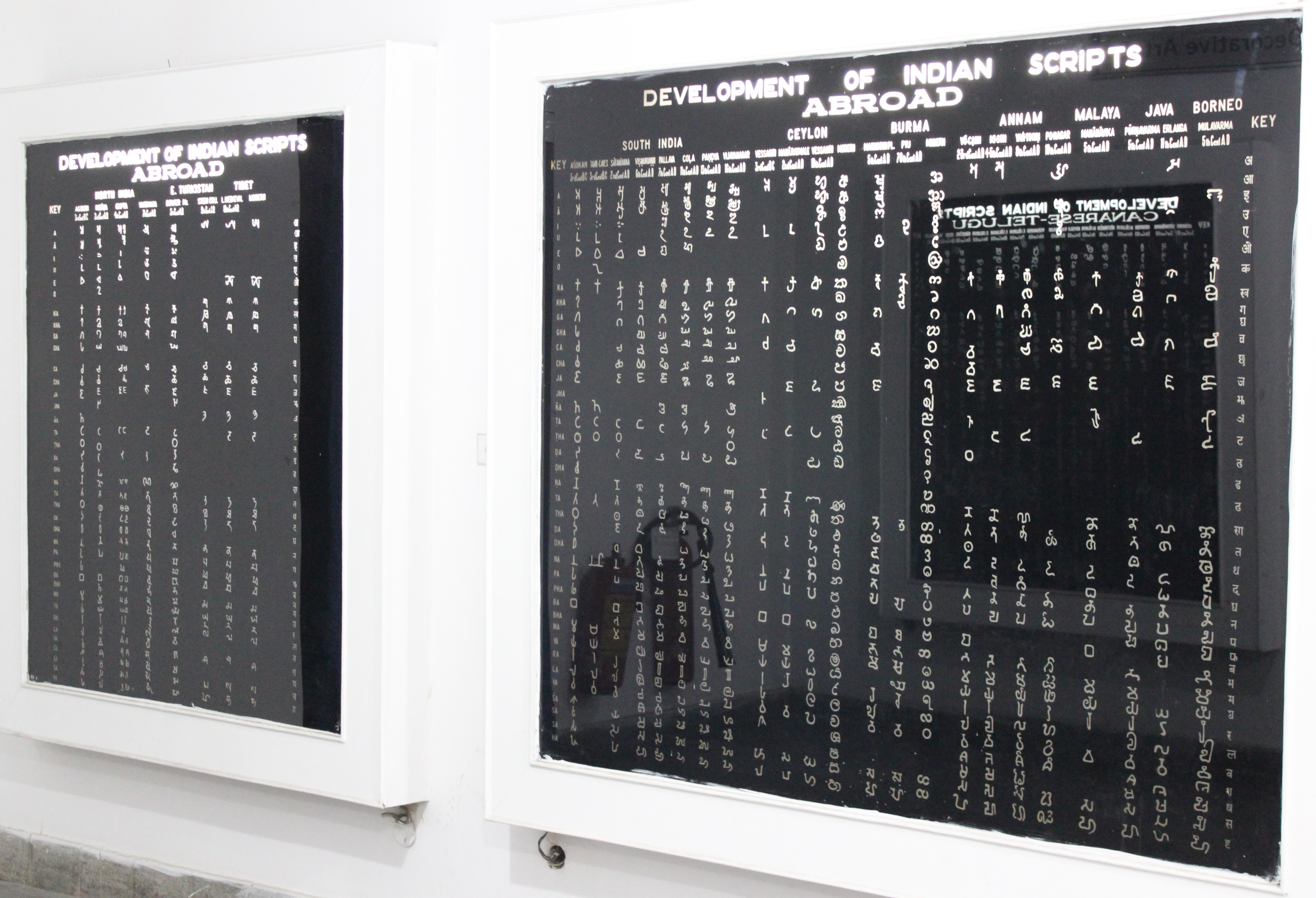
Inside the Galleries of National Museum, New Delhi

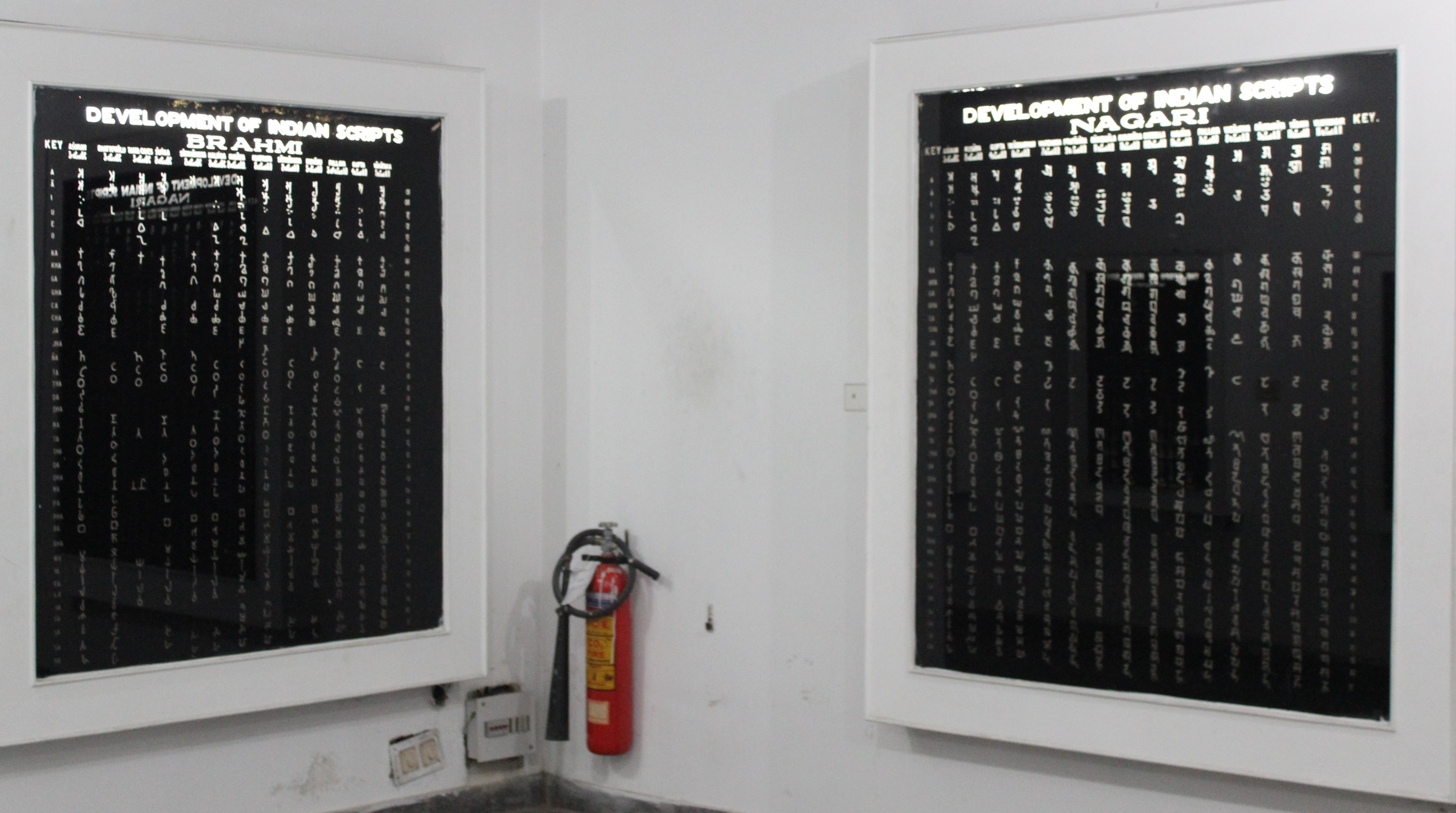
Inside the Galleries of National Museum, New Delhi

=== Bronze Gallery ===
The Bronze Gallery, showcases pioneer works of bronze in Indian art and sculpture. Renovated to present information in a unique and accessible way, the gallery features a striking layout that juxtaposes the sculptures with detailed descriptions providing context, significance and production processes of the objects. The gallery has been curated by Shri Tejpal Singh, Deputy Curator, Archaeology and designed by Ms.Matrika, Mumbai and executed by CPWD.

Four Buddha images from Phophnar, Madhya Pradesh known for their excellence are on display. The Pala bronzes from 8th to 10th century, mainly Buddhist in theme are from Nalanda in Bihar. The bronzes from the Himalayan region, especially those belonging to Kashmir and Himachal Pradesh, represents bronzes of Northern India. Svachchhanda Bhairavi showcases the skill of the metal smith of Chamba and Vishnu Vaikuntha testifies to the high level of craftsmanship of Kashmiri artists. Selected Nepalese and Tibetan bronzes are also on view. The image of Vasudeva-Kamalja (half Vishnu and half Lakshmi) displayed here is an example of Nepalese bronze art and iconography.

Key highlights of the collections include:

- Vishnu Vaikuntha, Kashmir, Bronze, 9th century AD
- Nataraja, Chola, Tamil Nadu, 12th century AD
- Kaliya-Mardan Krishna, Early Chola, 10th century AD
- Siva- Tripurantaka, Early Chola, 9th century AD
- Svachchhanda Bhairavi, Utpala Chamba, Himachal Pradesh, 10th century AD

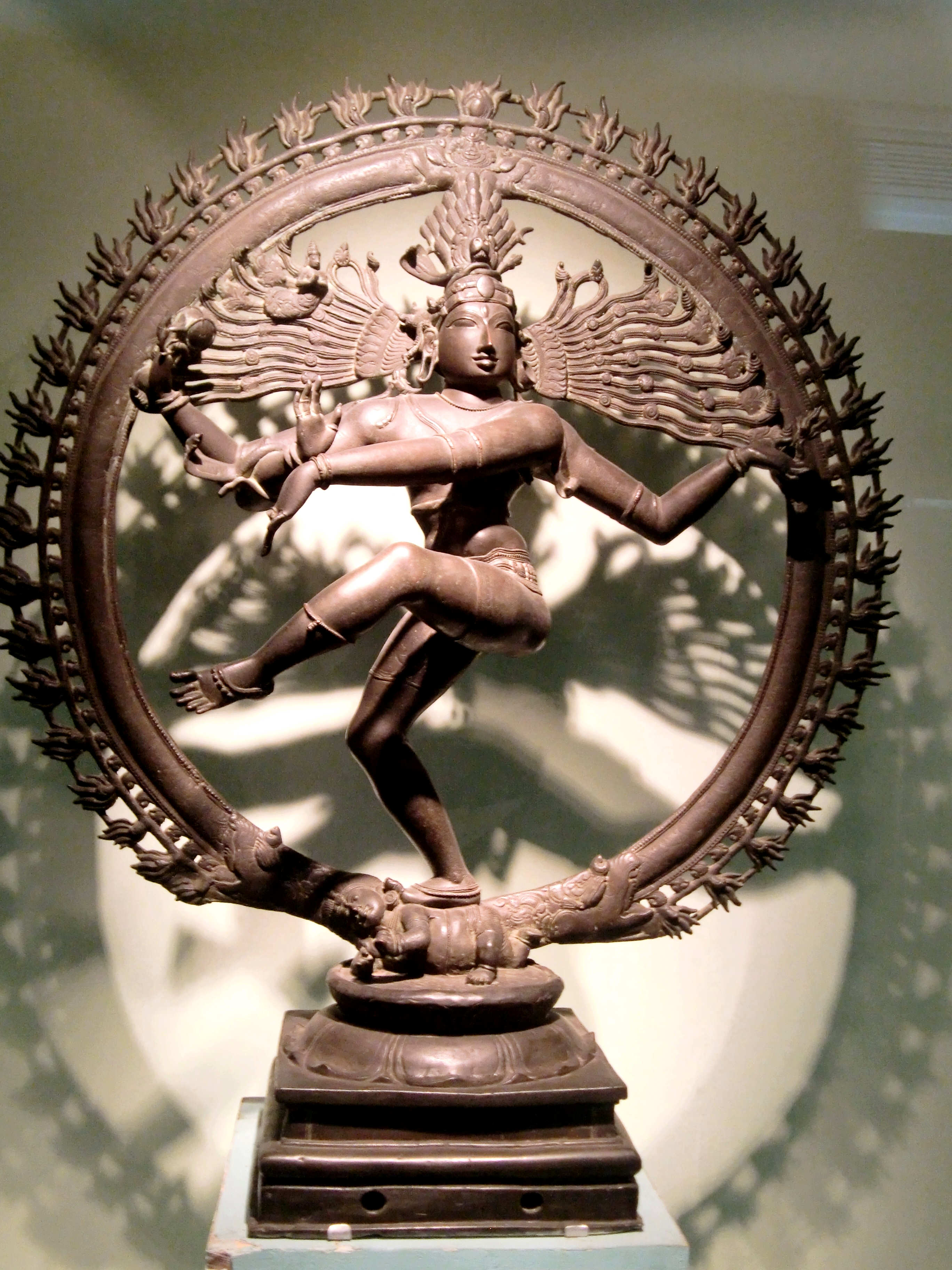
Shiva dancing Nataraja, Chola 12th century CE, Bronze

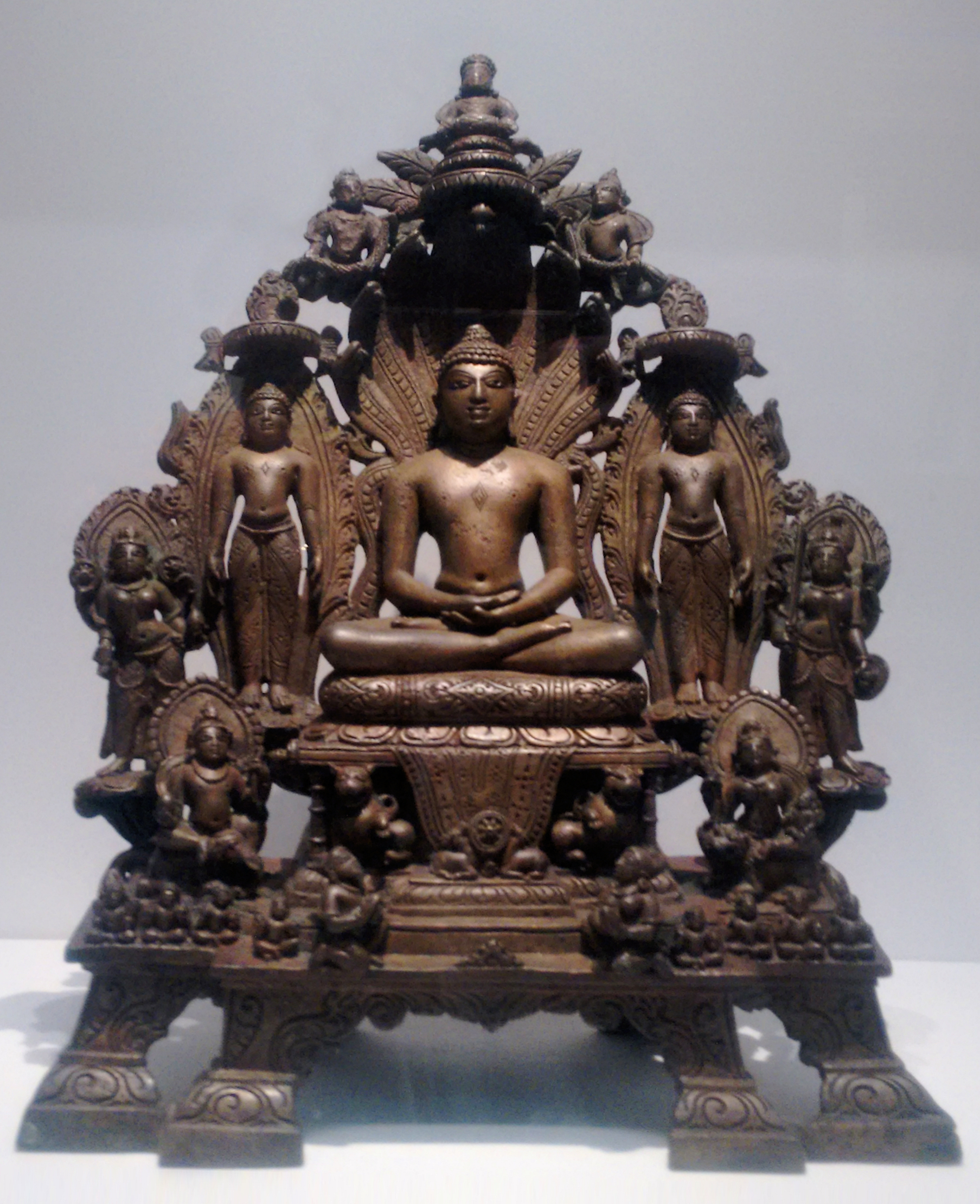
Parsvanatha, Maitraka, 9th century, Akota, Gujarat

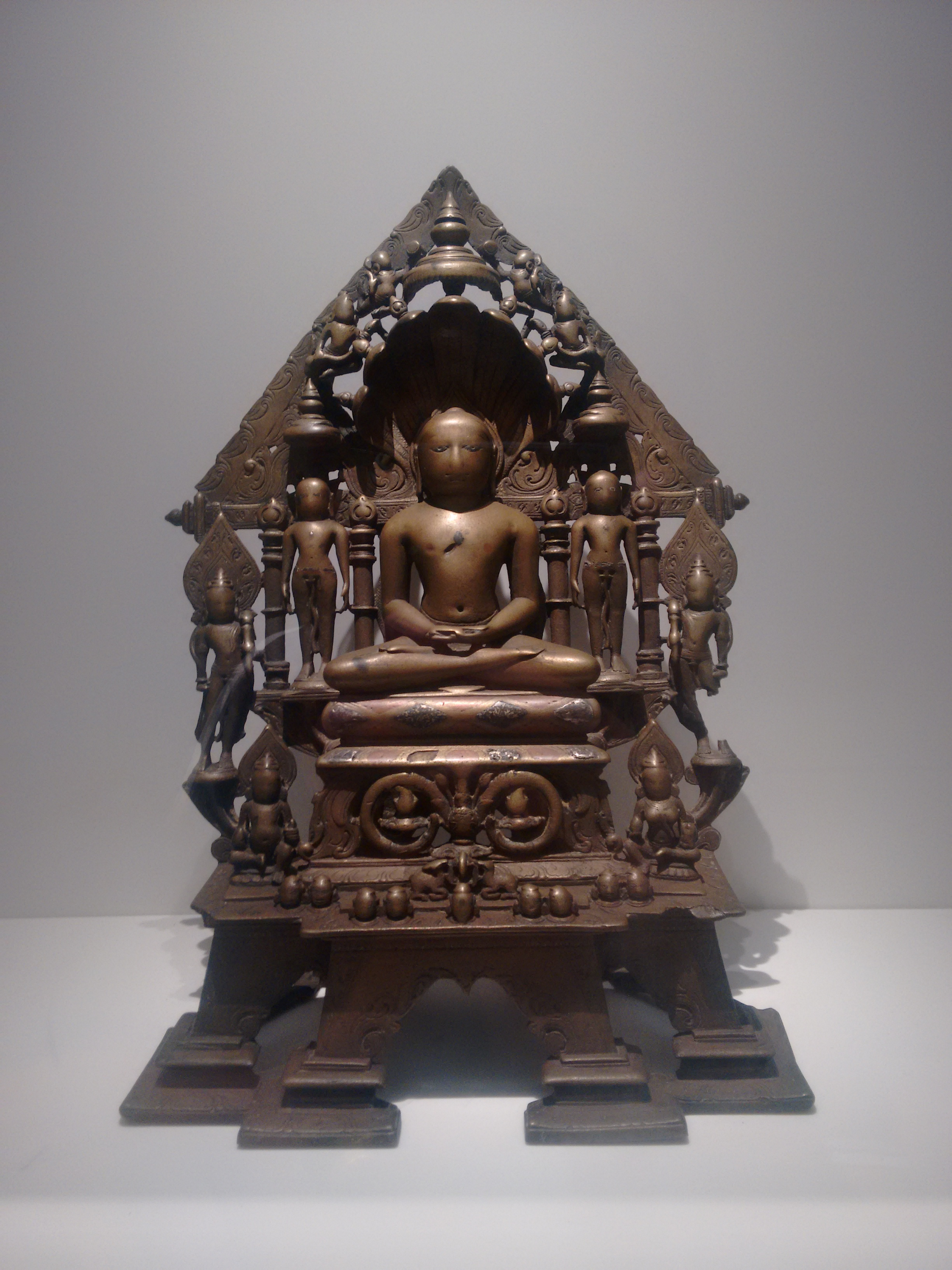
Parsvanatha, 1062 CE, Western India,

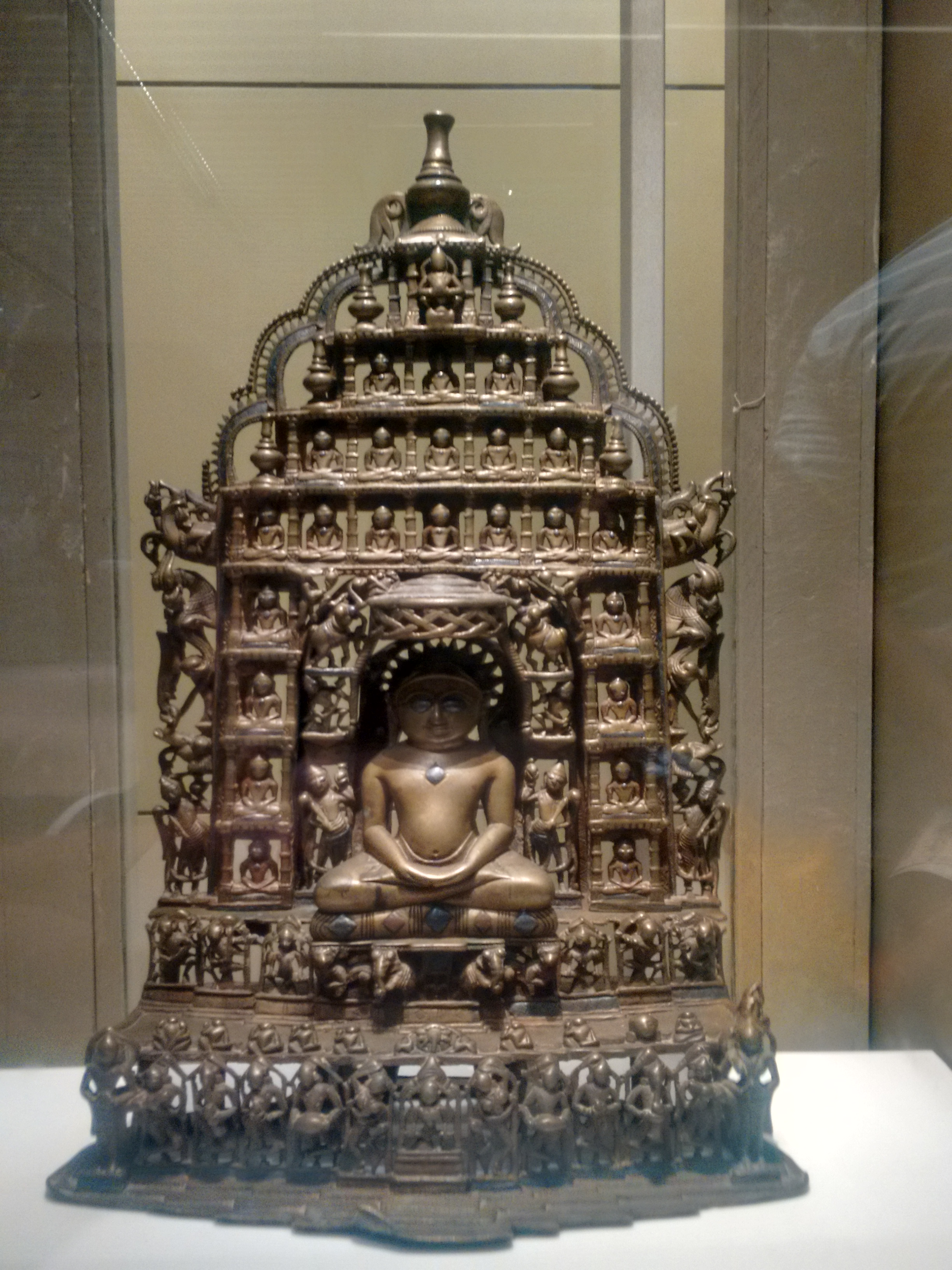
Chaubisi of Kunthunatha, 1465 CE, Western India

=== Manuscripts Gallery ===
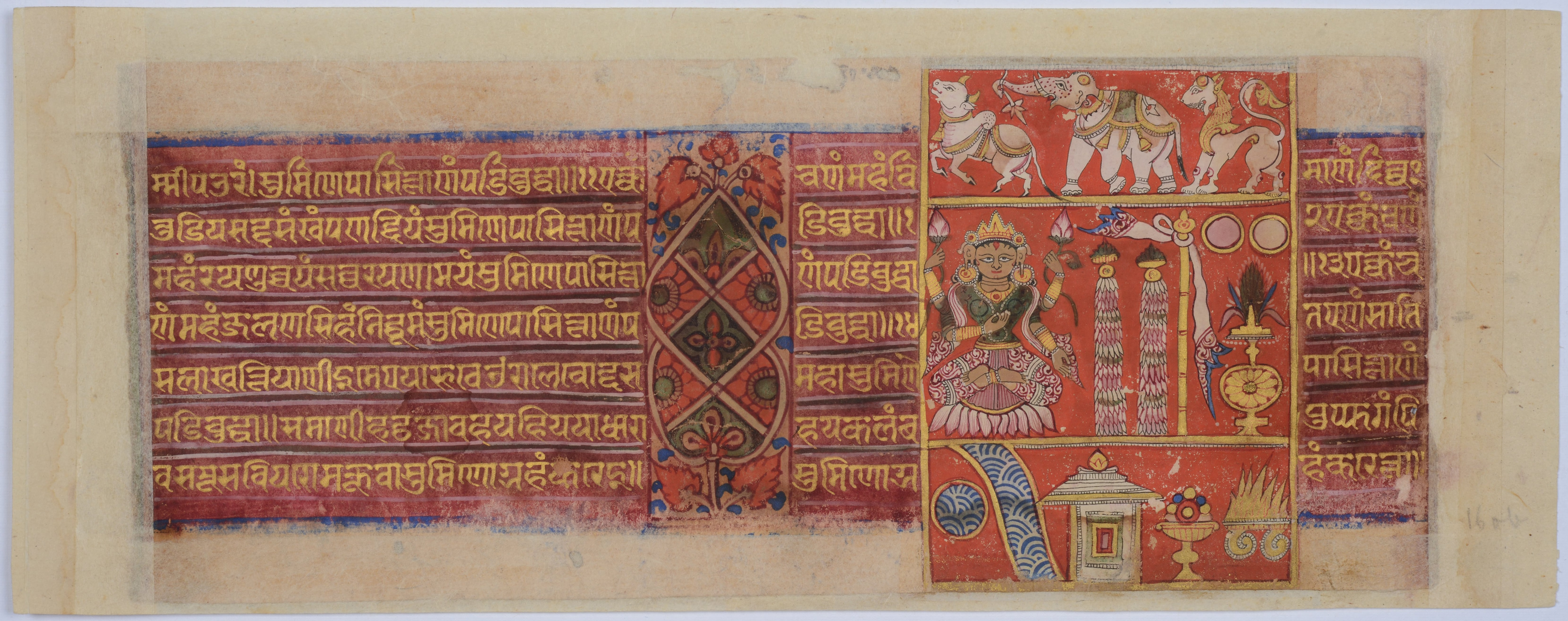
Folio from the Mandu Kalpa Sutra. Mandu, 1439

The museum comprises over 14,000 manuscripts and texts, of which about 1000 are illustrated. The collection of manuscripts are in various languages and scripts covering a large number of subjects. They are written on different types of materials such as parchment, birch bark, palm leaf, cloth, paper and metals. All the manuscripts represent various religions and sects of the Indian Subcontinent covering the period from the 7th to the 19th centuries. Dated manuscripts elaborate the Indian history with authoritative authenticity.

Key highlights of the collections include:

- Asthasahasrika Prajnaparamita, Sanskrit, Palm Leaf, 12th century AD
- Baburnama, Persian, Paper, AD 1598
- Balabodhini, Sanskrit, Birch-bark manuscript, 12th century AD
- Gita Govinda of Jayadeva, Sanskrit, Palm leaf; 14 folios in accordion format, 18th century AD
- Jain Kalpa sutras, Prakrit, Paper, 15th century AD

=== Coins Gallery ===
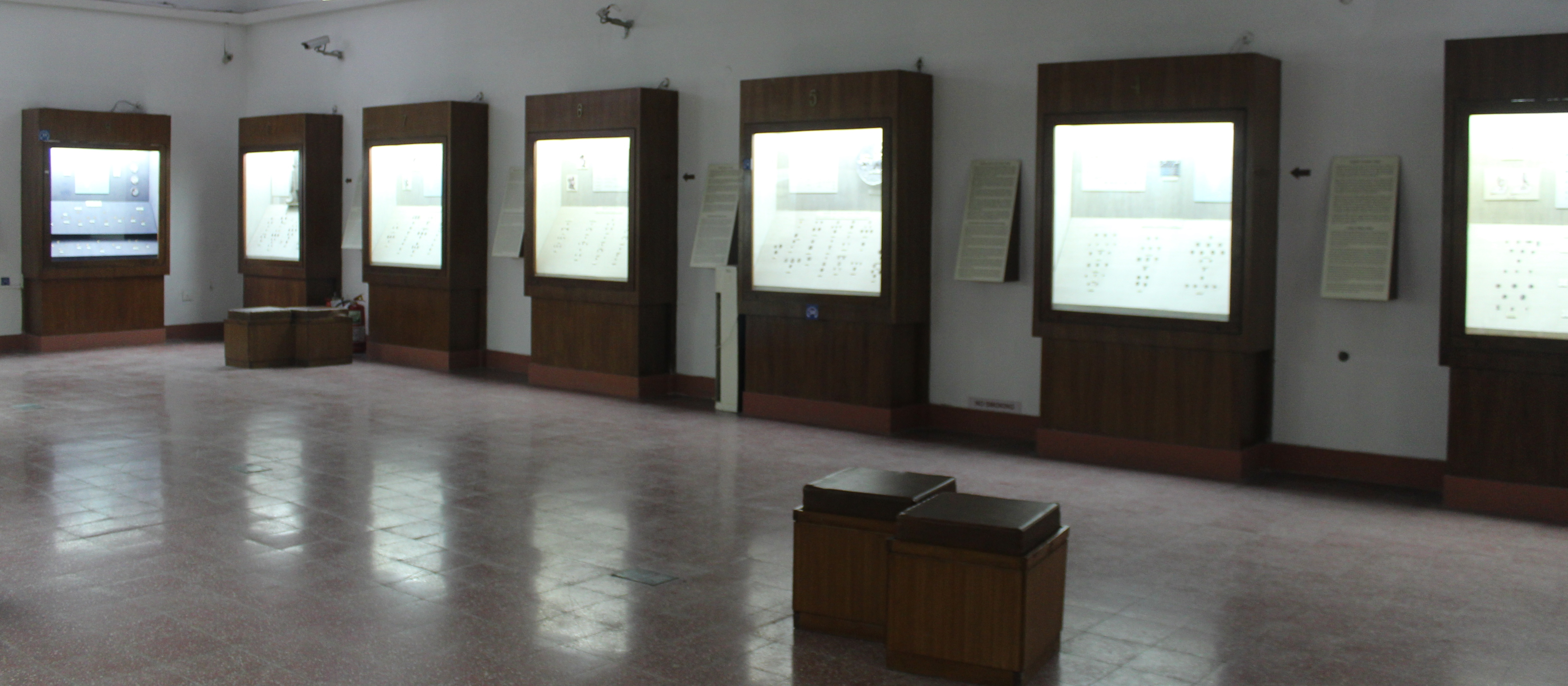
Coins Gallery

The Coins Gallery of the National Museum, New Delhi has over 130,000 coins in its reserve with some of the rarest coins, ranging from sixth century BC, when coins are believed to have first appeared in the country. The gallery displays 1669 coins along with five replicas of coins, five measuring vessels and some couries and ratties that were used in ancient times as weights and measures. It has almost all Indian coins from the earliest bent bar, punch-marked coins to those of Indian Pot with Seated Monkey States, British India and post-independence coins. The entire history of Indian coinage from about 6th century BCE to the beginning of the 21st century is exhibited. There are various dioramas depicting various techniques of coin production. These coins can be considered rich and authentic source of information on various aspects of Ancient, Medieval and Modern Indian History.

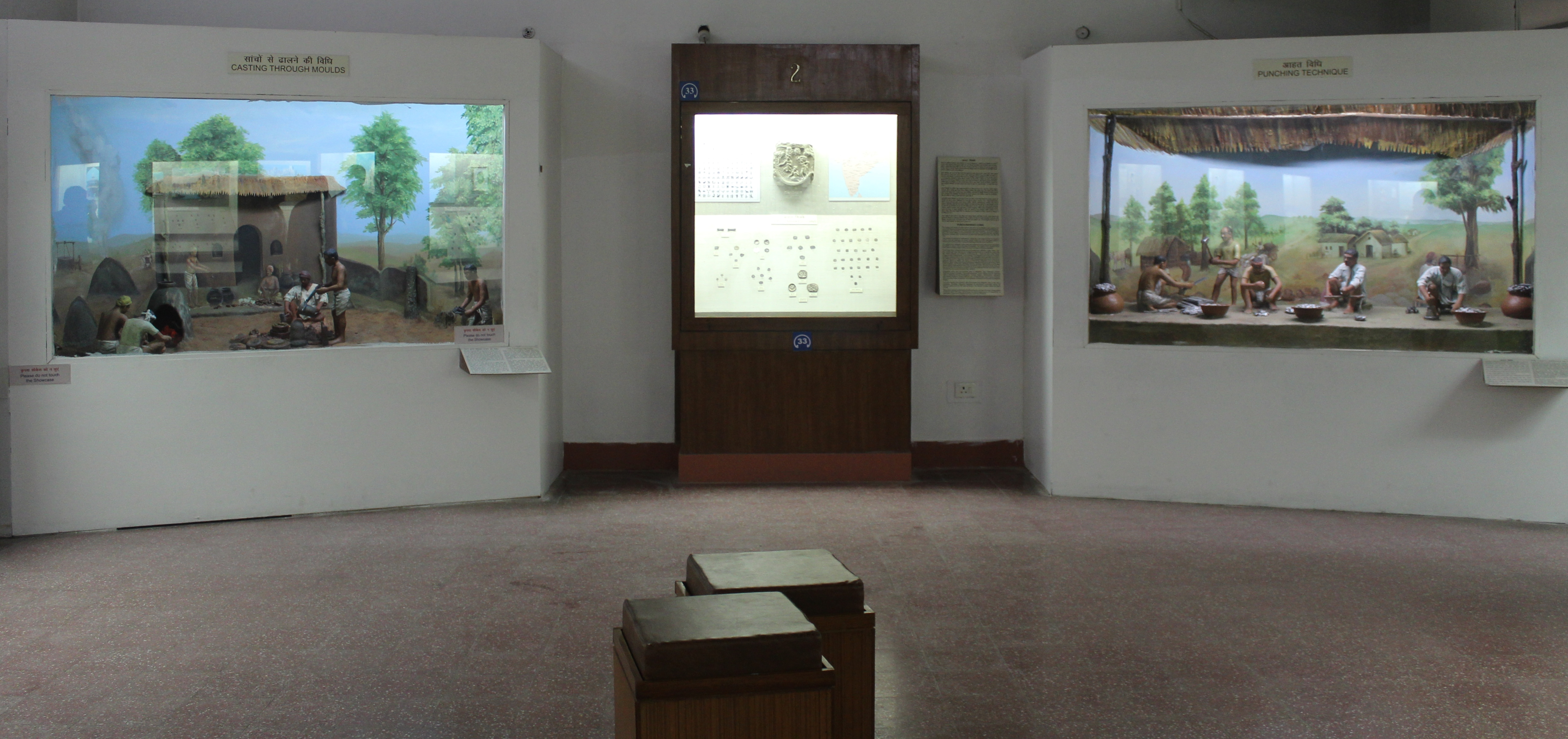
View of the different methods over time

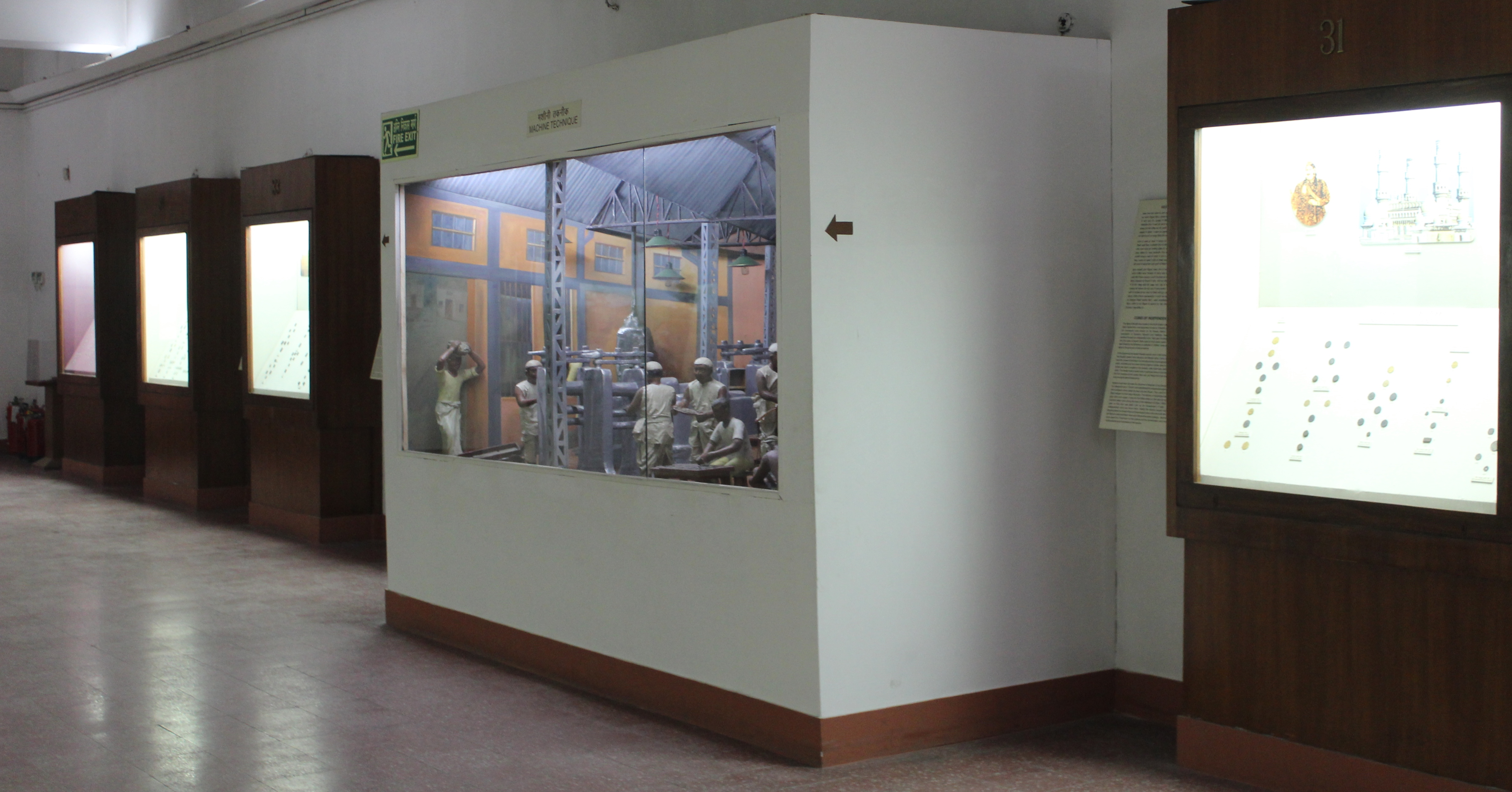
View of the Coins Gallery

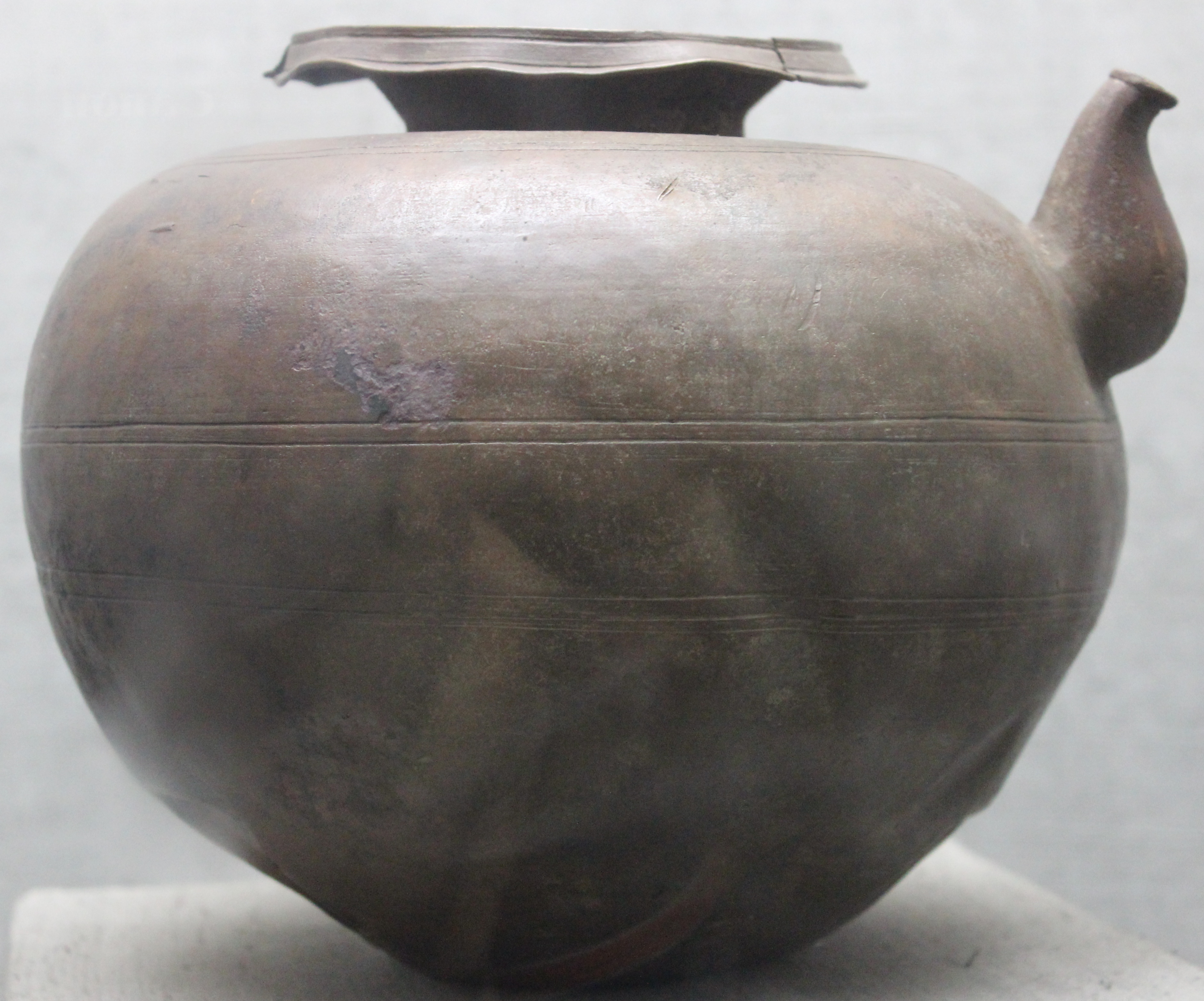
This is the Copper Vase which contained the 1821 gold Coins of the Gupta era found at Bayana, District Bharatpur, Rajasthan

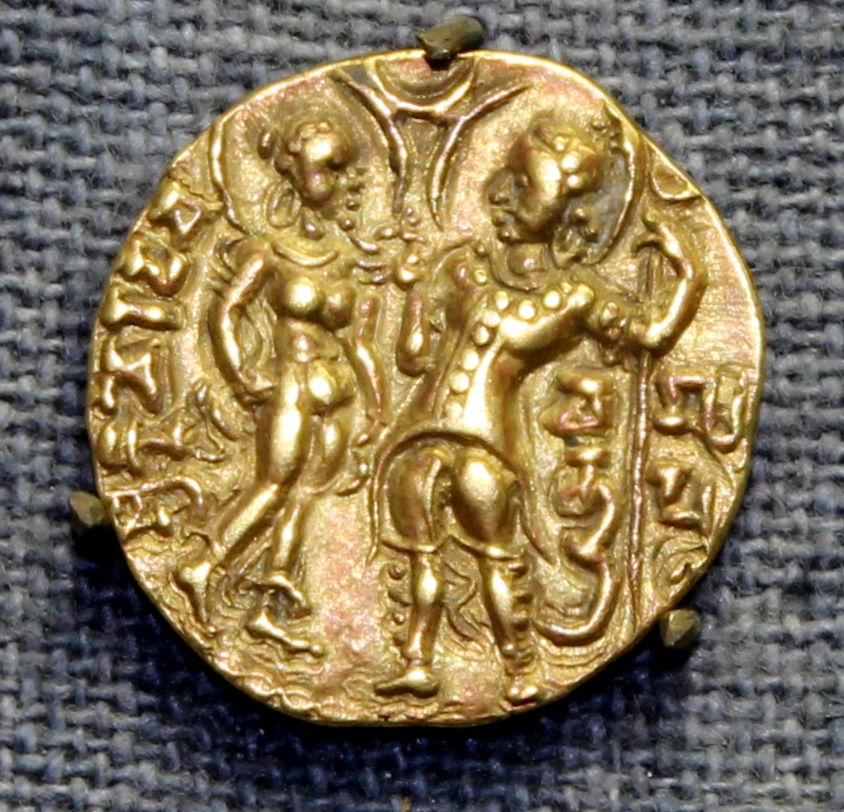
Chandragupta with his Wife

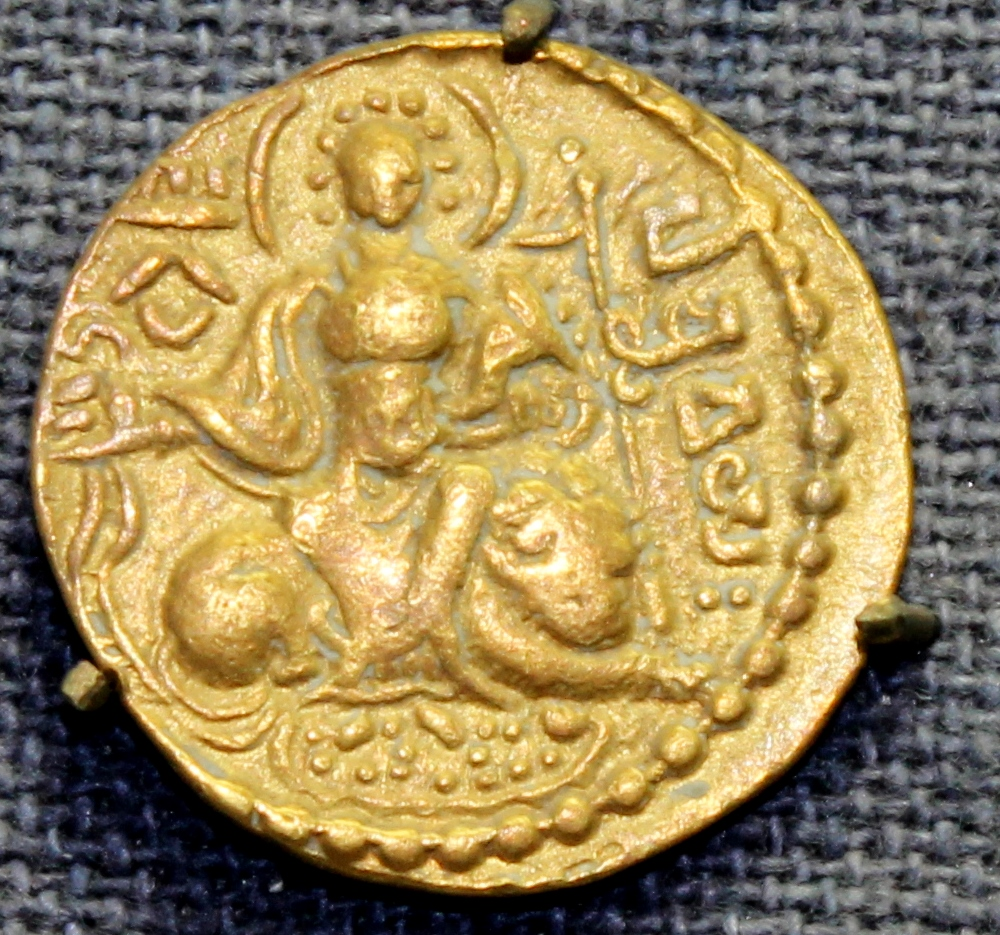
Chandragupta I

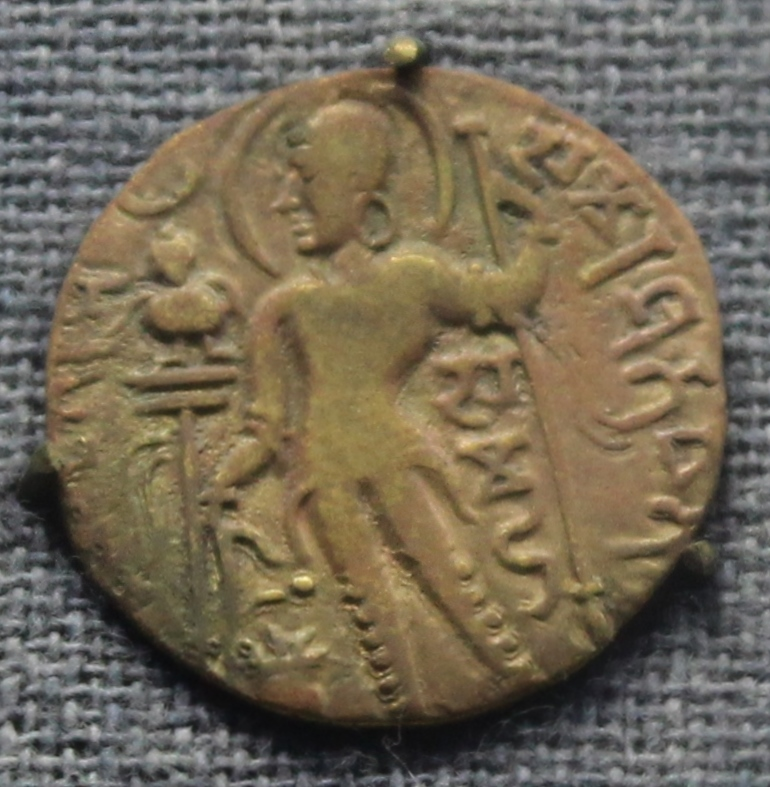
Samudragupta

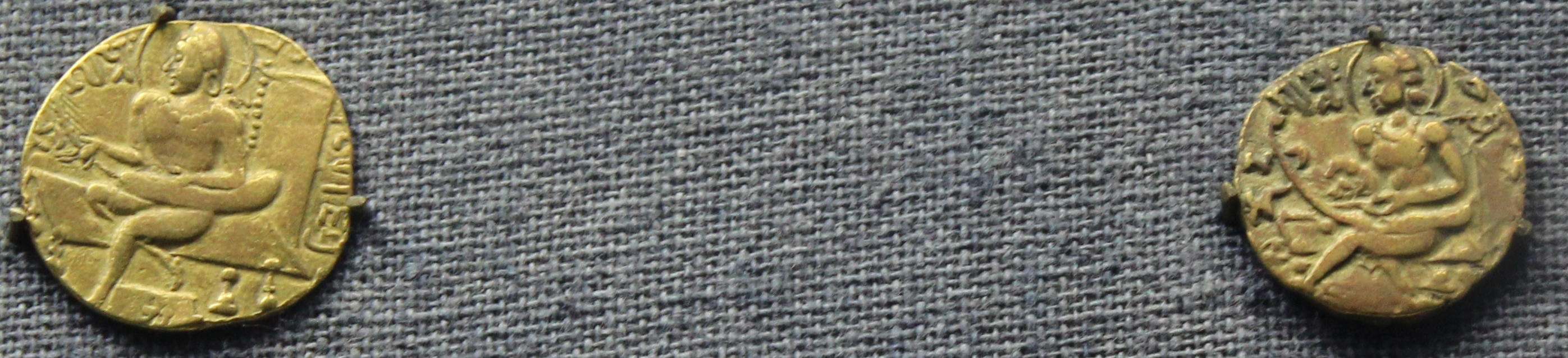
Samudragupta playing Veena

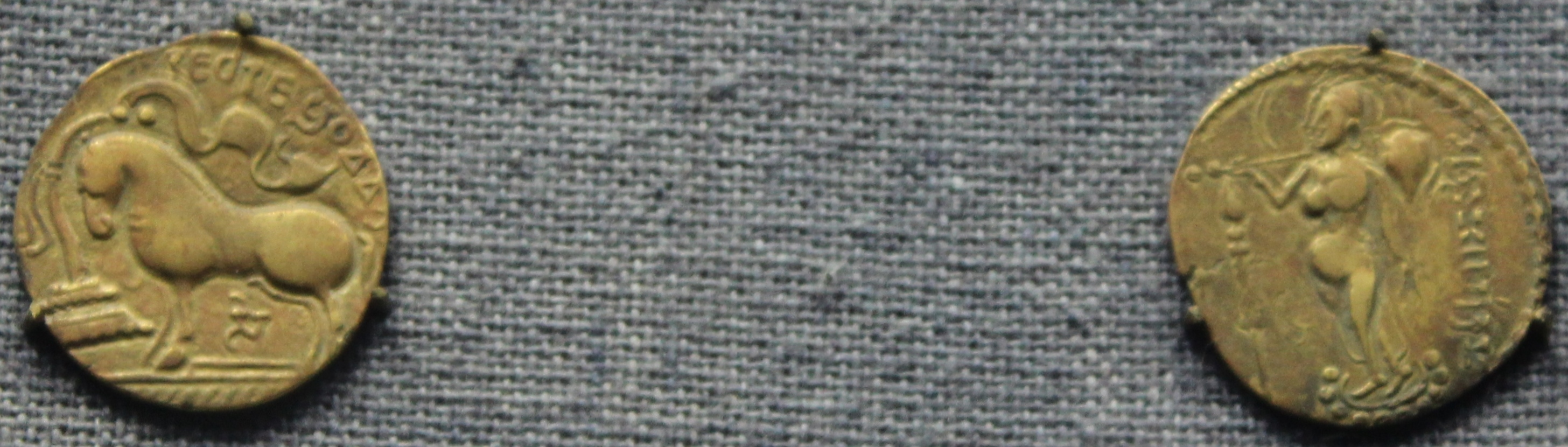
Ashvamedha Coins

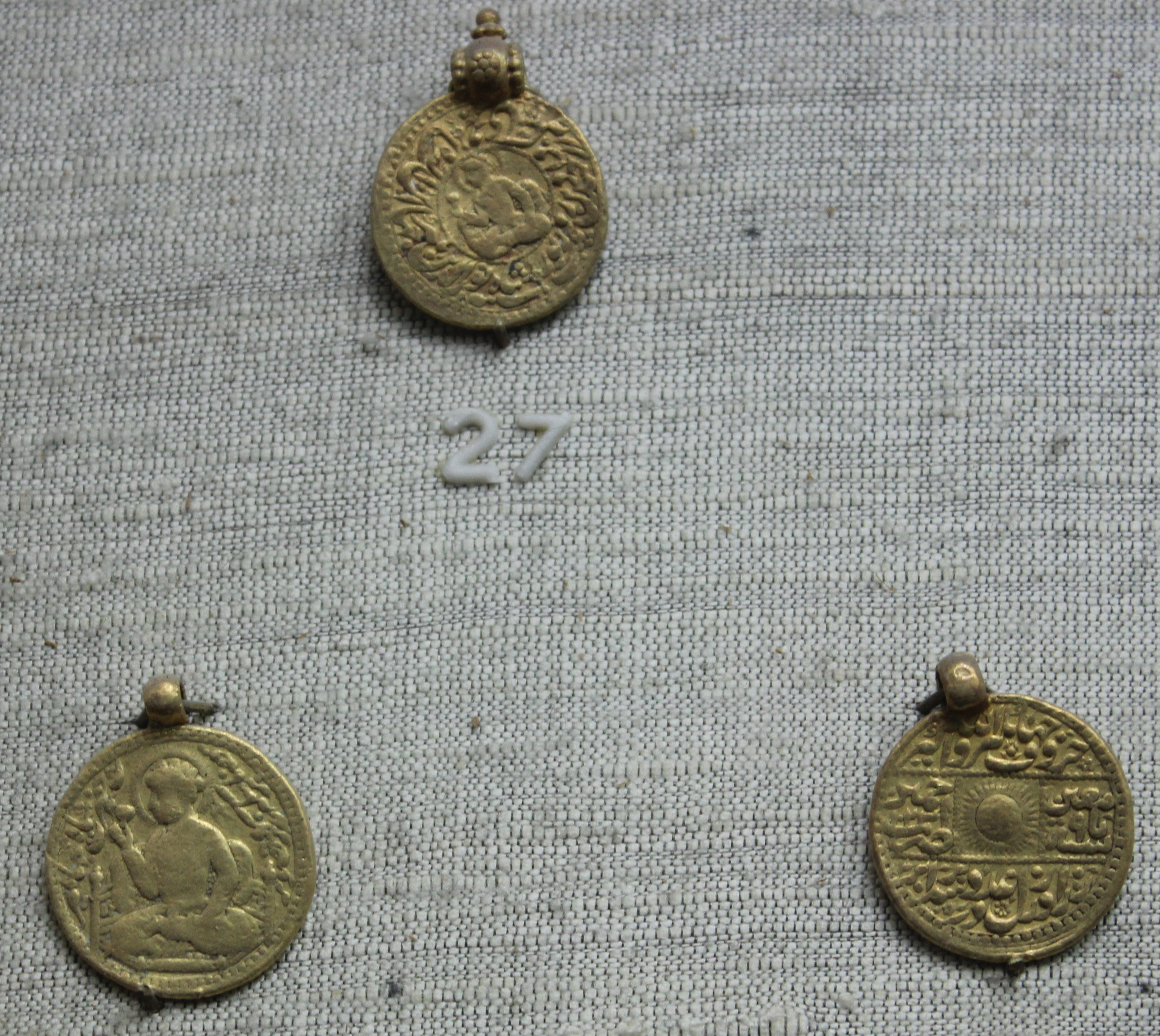
Jahangir's Coins

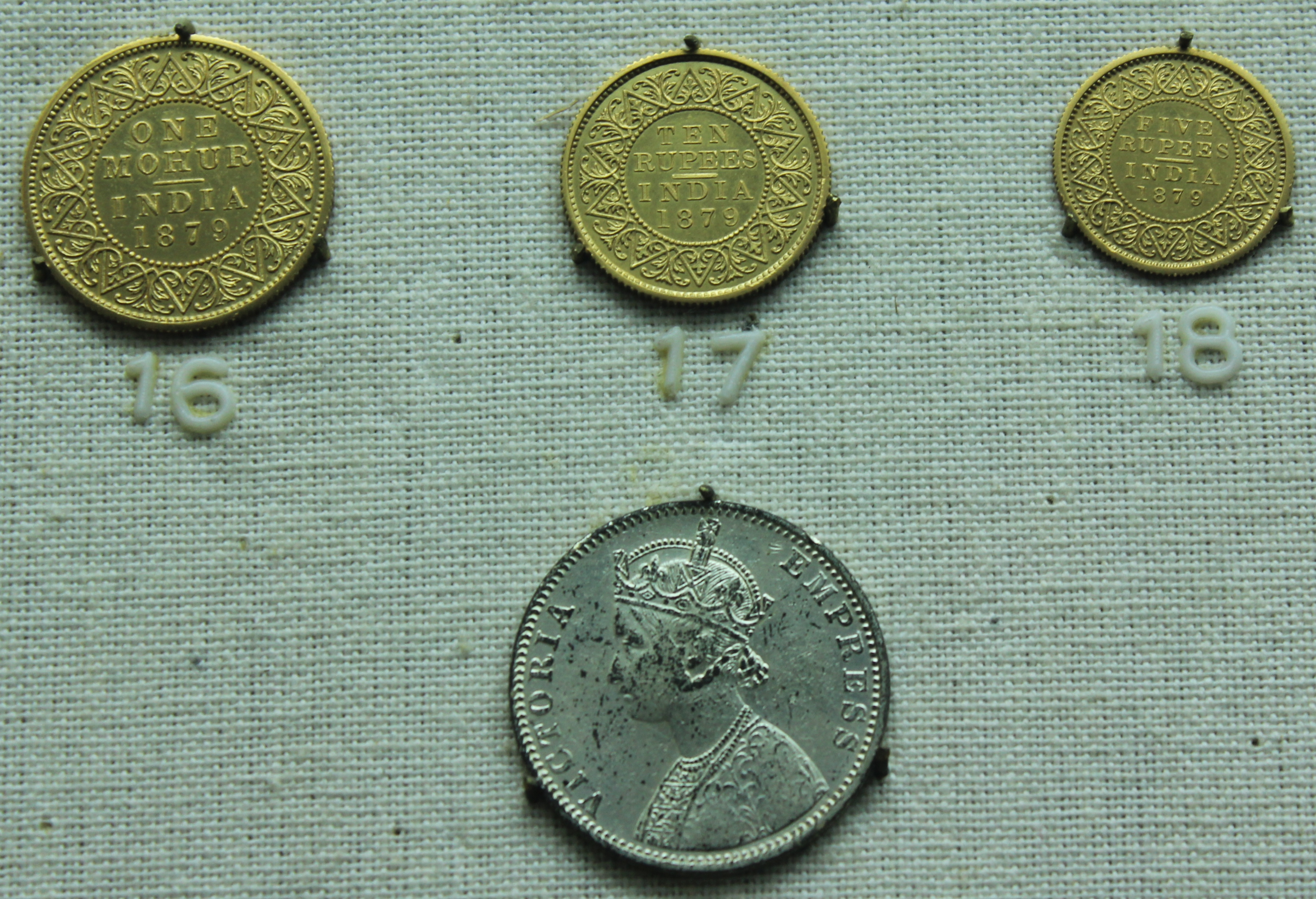
British Indian coins, 18th century CE

=== Central Asian Gallery ===
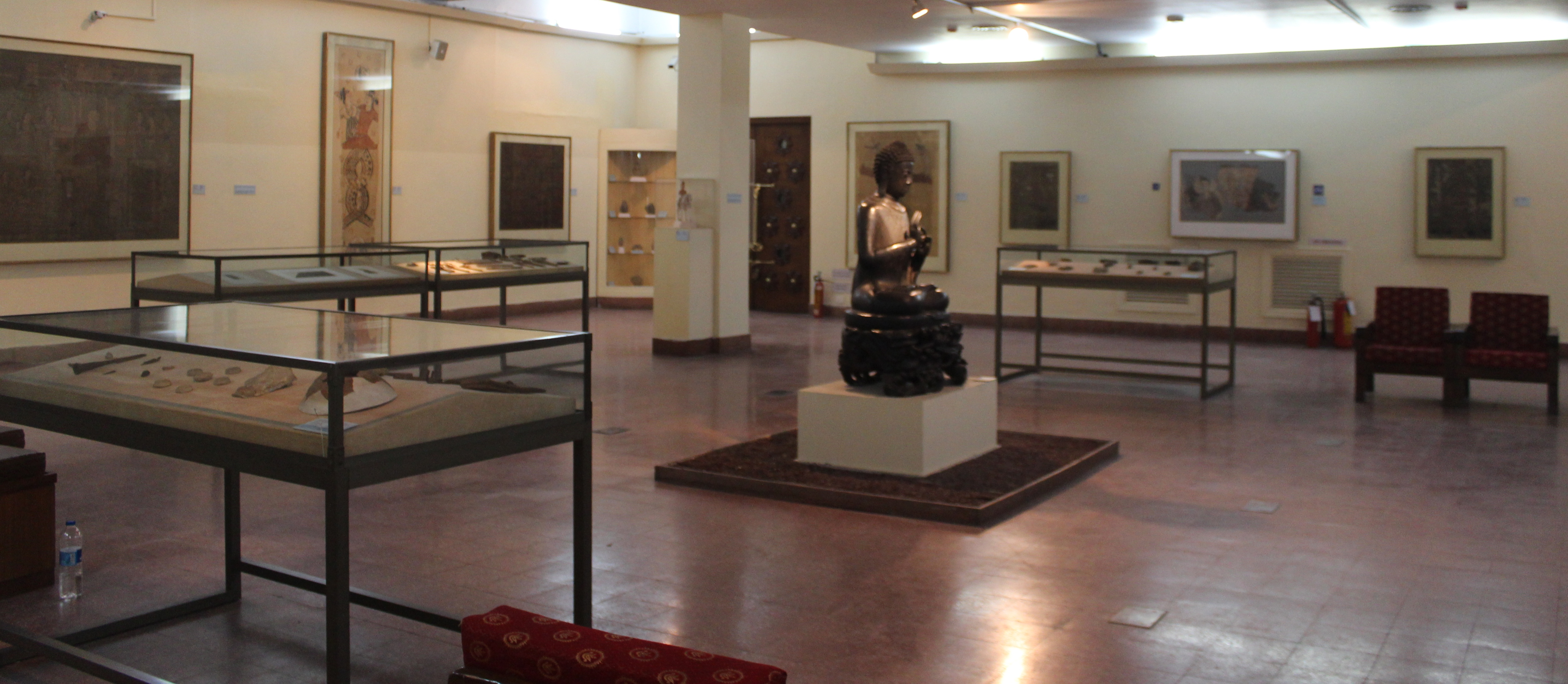
Artefacts in the Central Asian Gallery

The vast and varied collection of this gallery was excavated, explored and collected by Sir Aurel Stein, one of the major archaeological explorers of early 20th century. He collected these cultural materials from more than 100 Ancient Cities along the Silk Route during three major expeditions carried out by him in 1900–1901, 1906–1908 and 1913–1916. The collection consists of wall paintings, painted silk banners, sculptures in wood, stucco and terracotta, coins, porcelain and pottery objects, leather, grass and fiber, precious items of gold and silver, religious and secular documents.

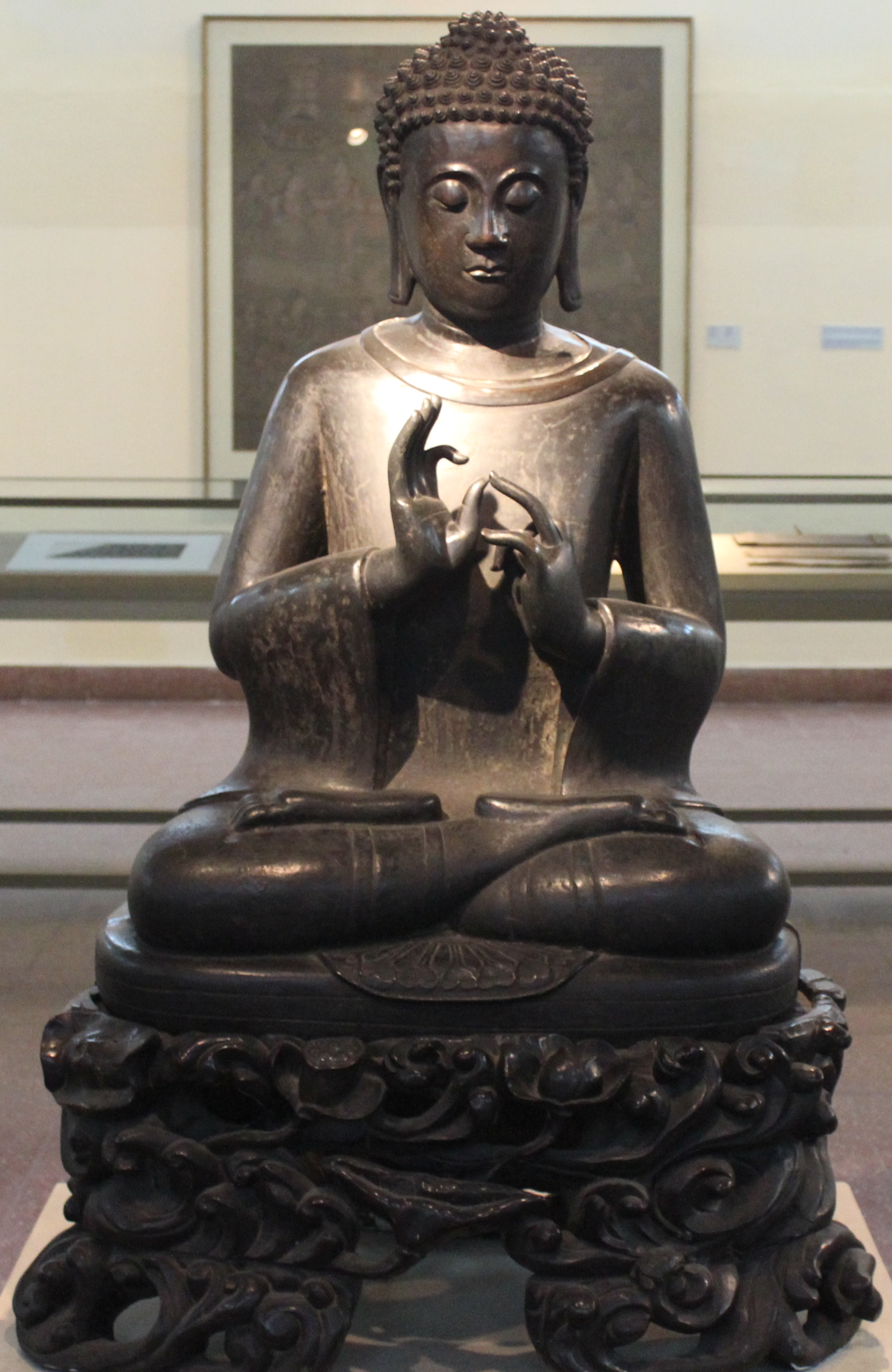
Buddha in Dharmachakra Mudra

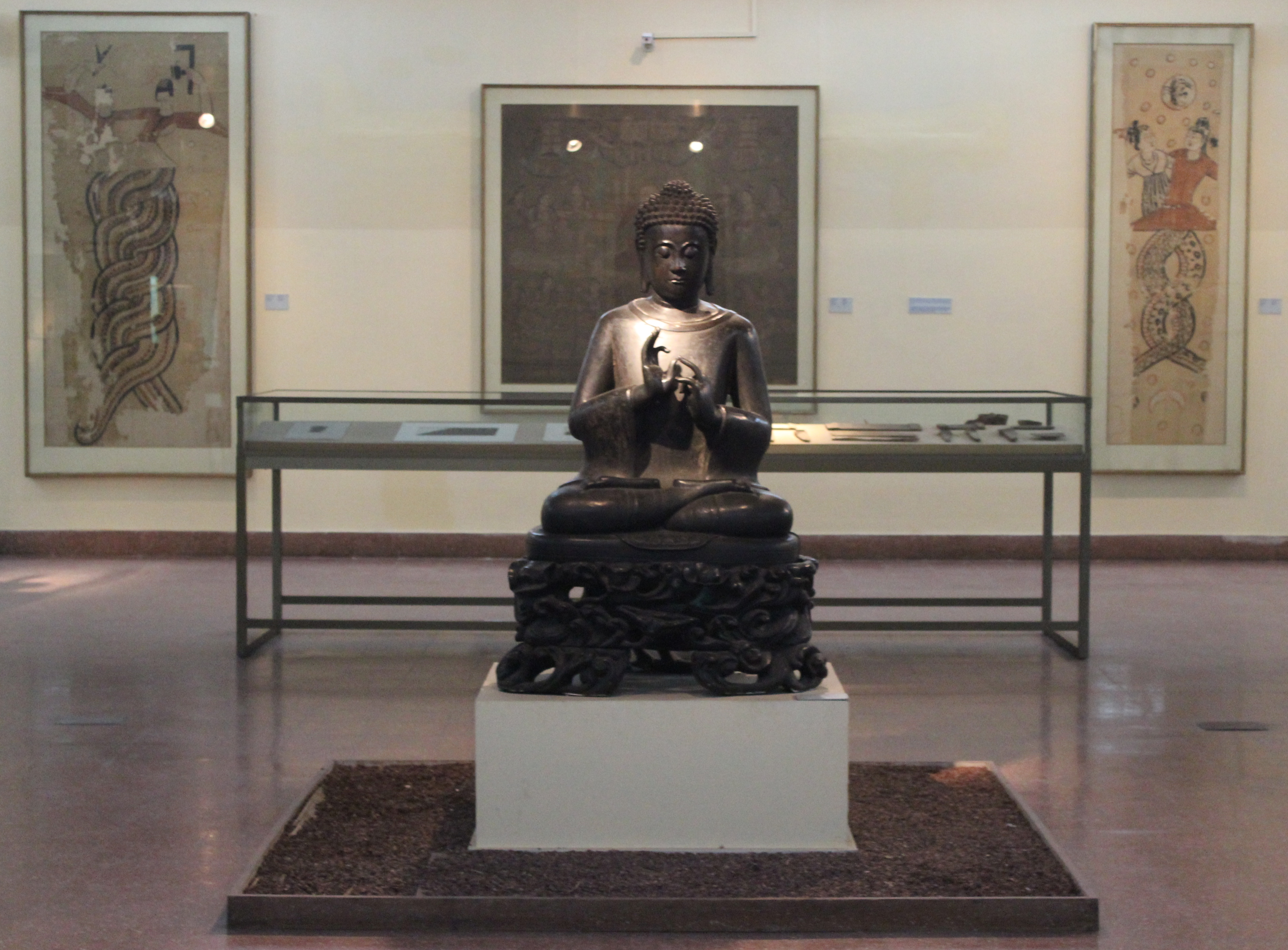
Buddha in the Central Asian Arts Gallery

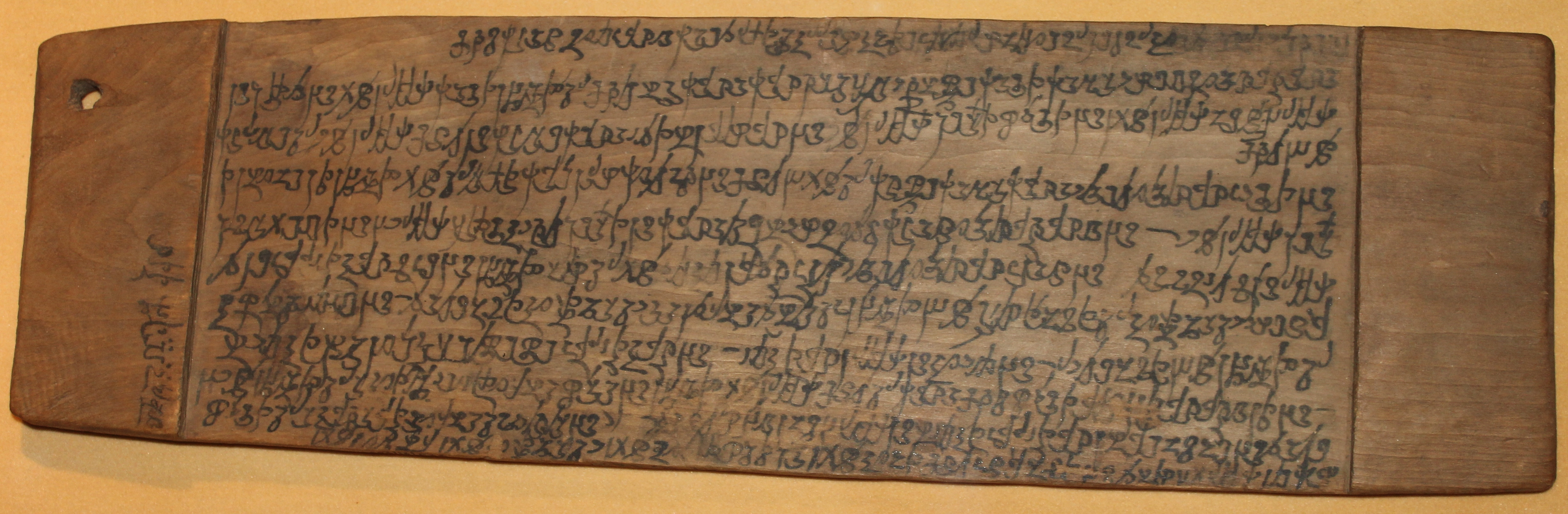
A tablet containing Kharoshti Script

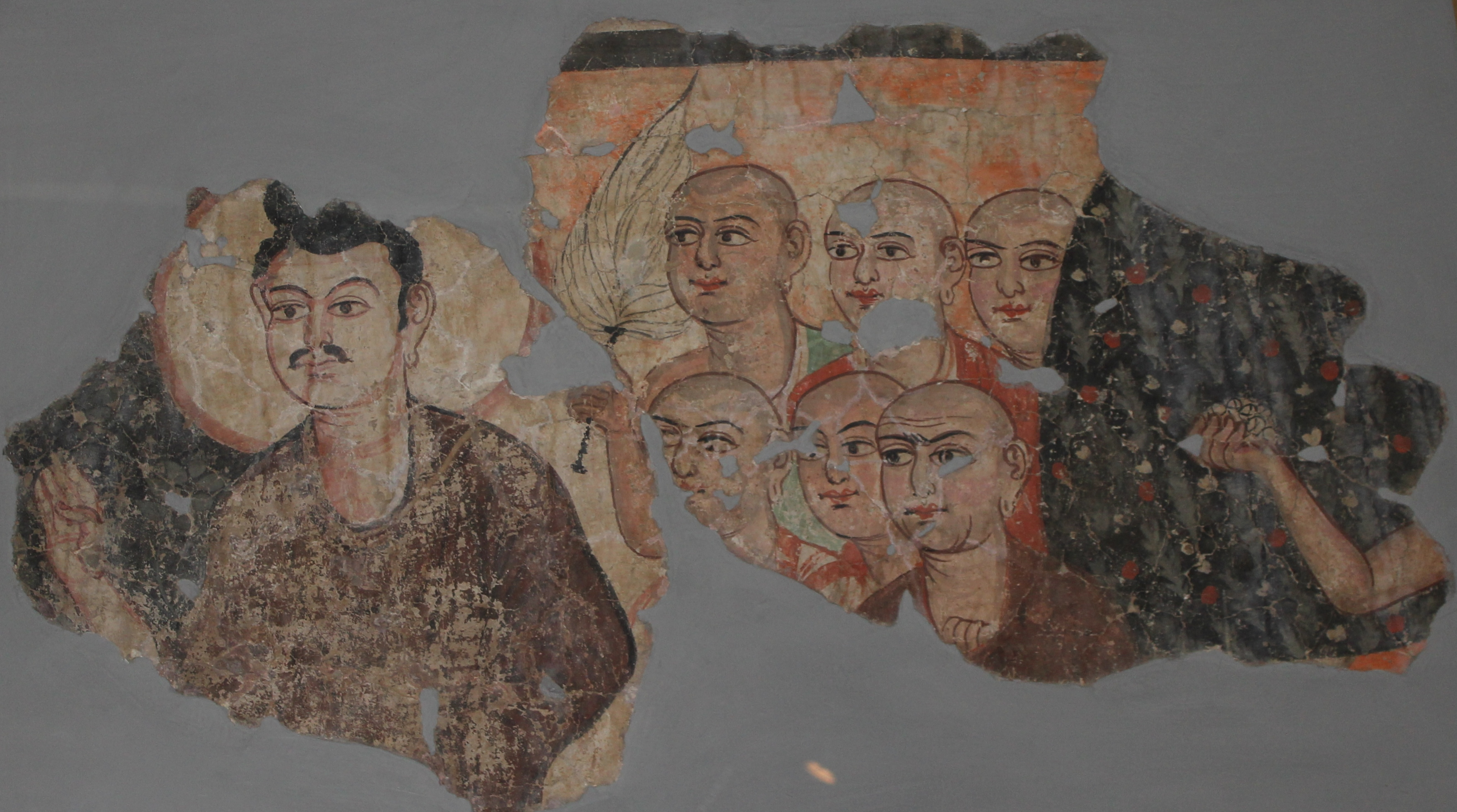
Part of a wall painting showing Buddha with his disciples

=== Maritime Heritage Gallery ===
A Maritime Heritage Gallery is located on the first floor of the National Museum which showcases the rich maritime heritage of India through various artefacts, photographs and dioramas. The gallery was set up in 1991.

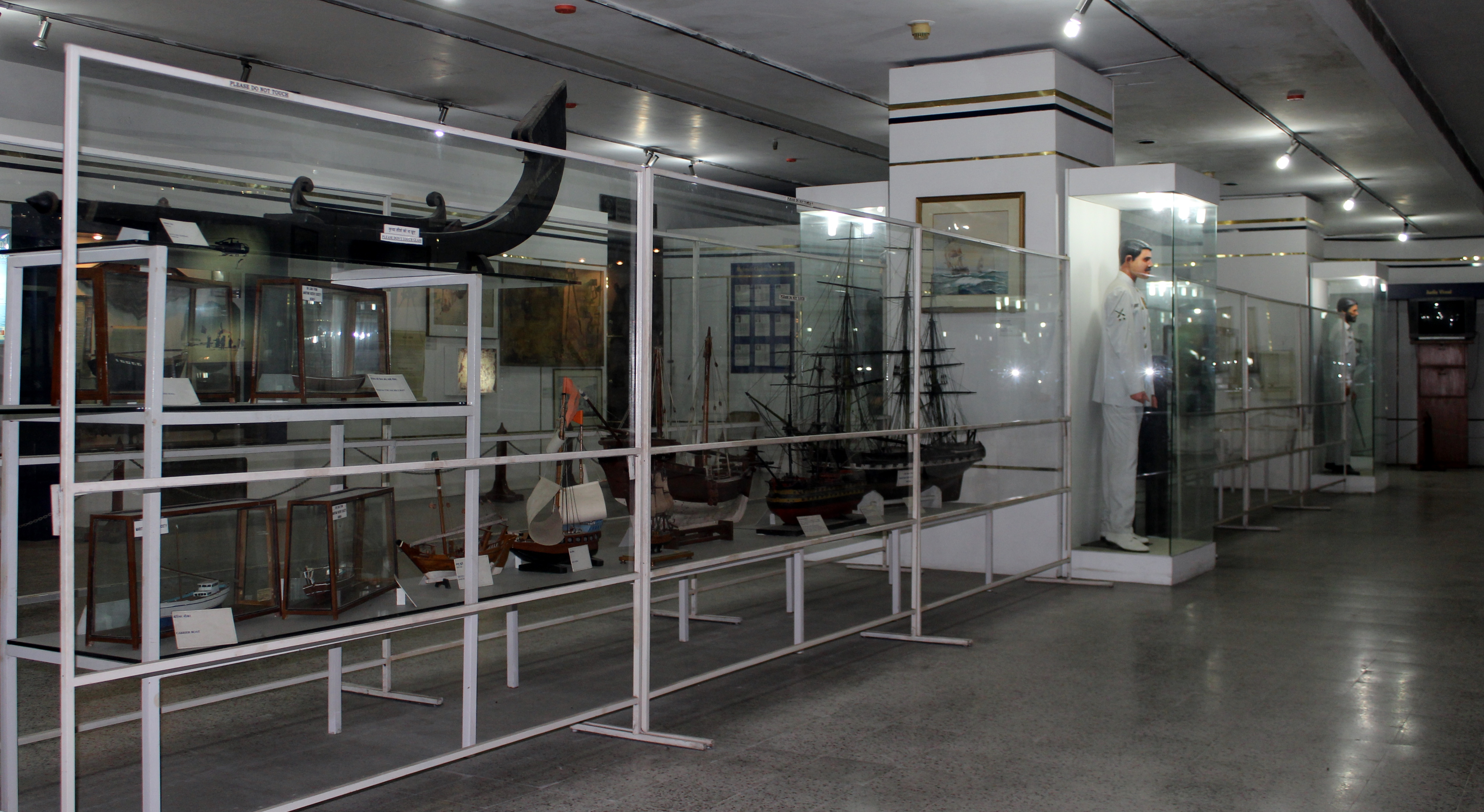
A view of the Maritime Gallery

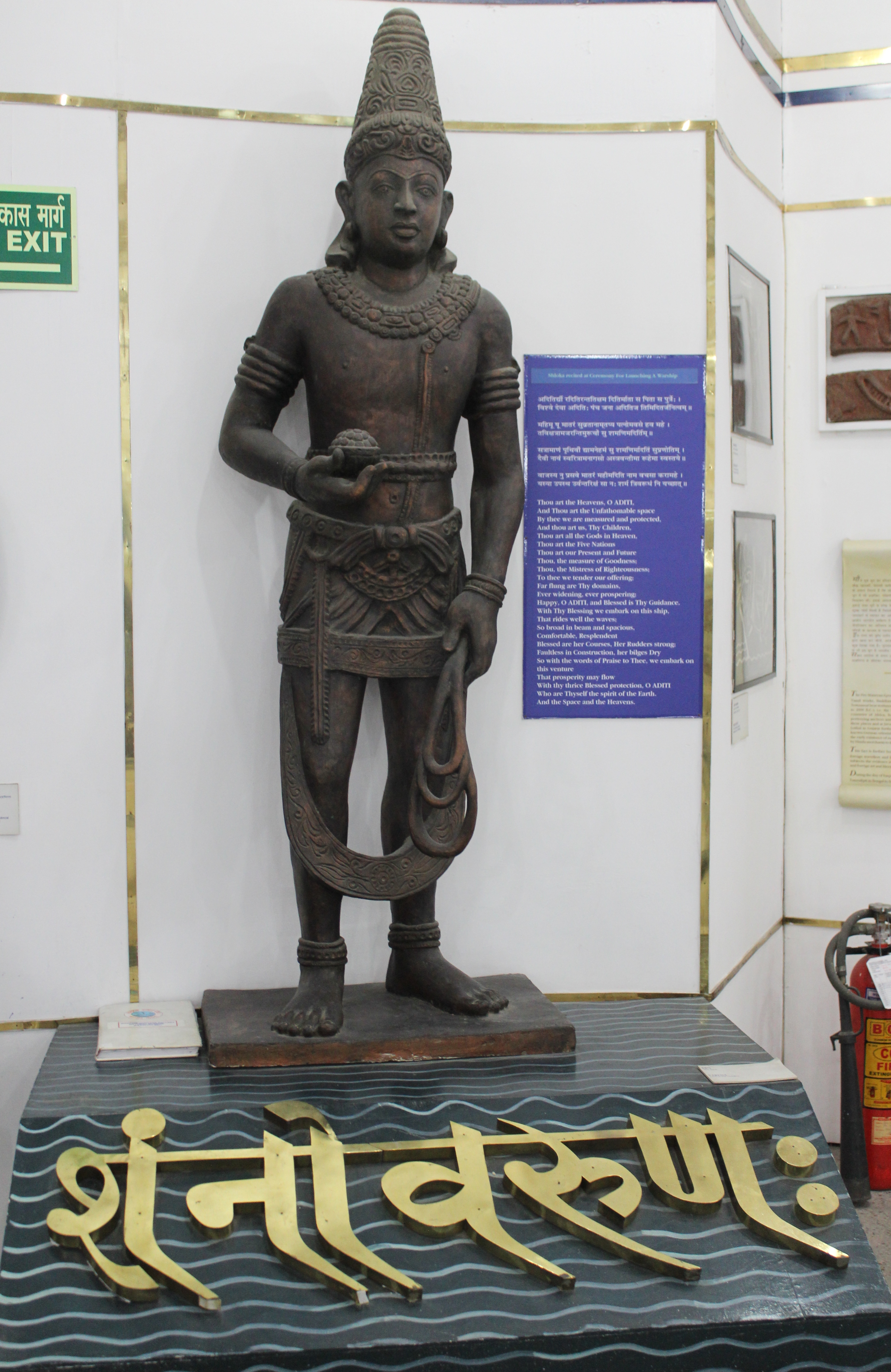
Inside the Gallery

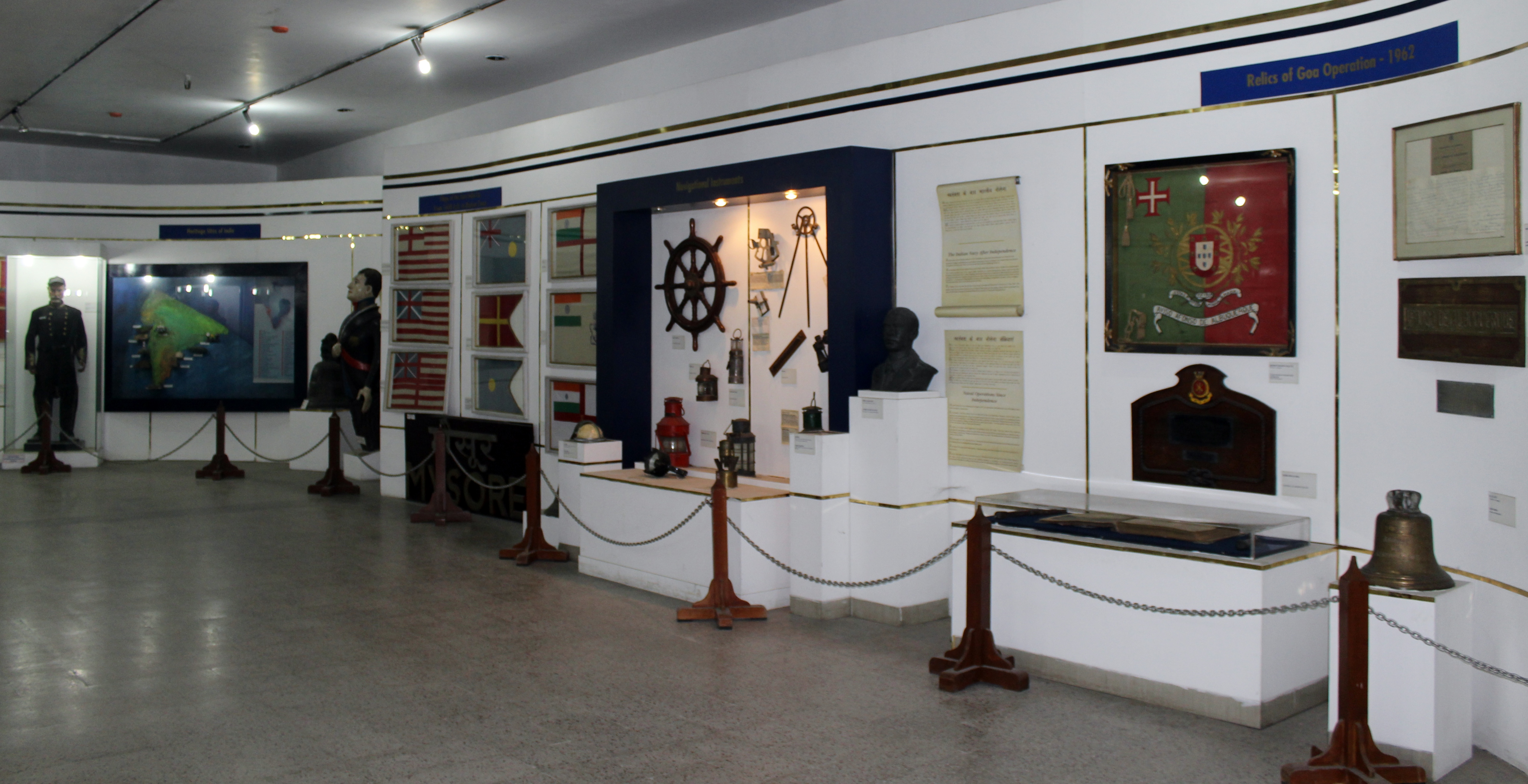
Different objects exhibited

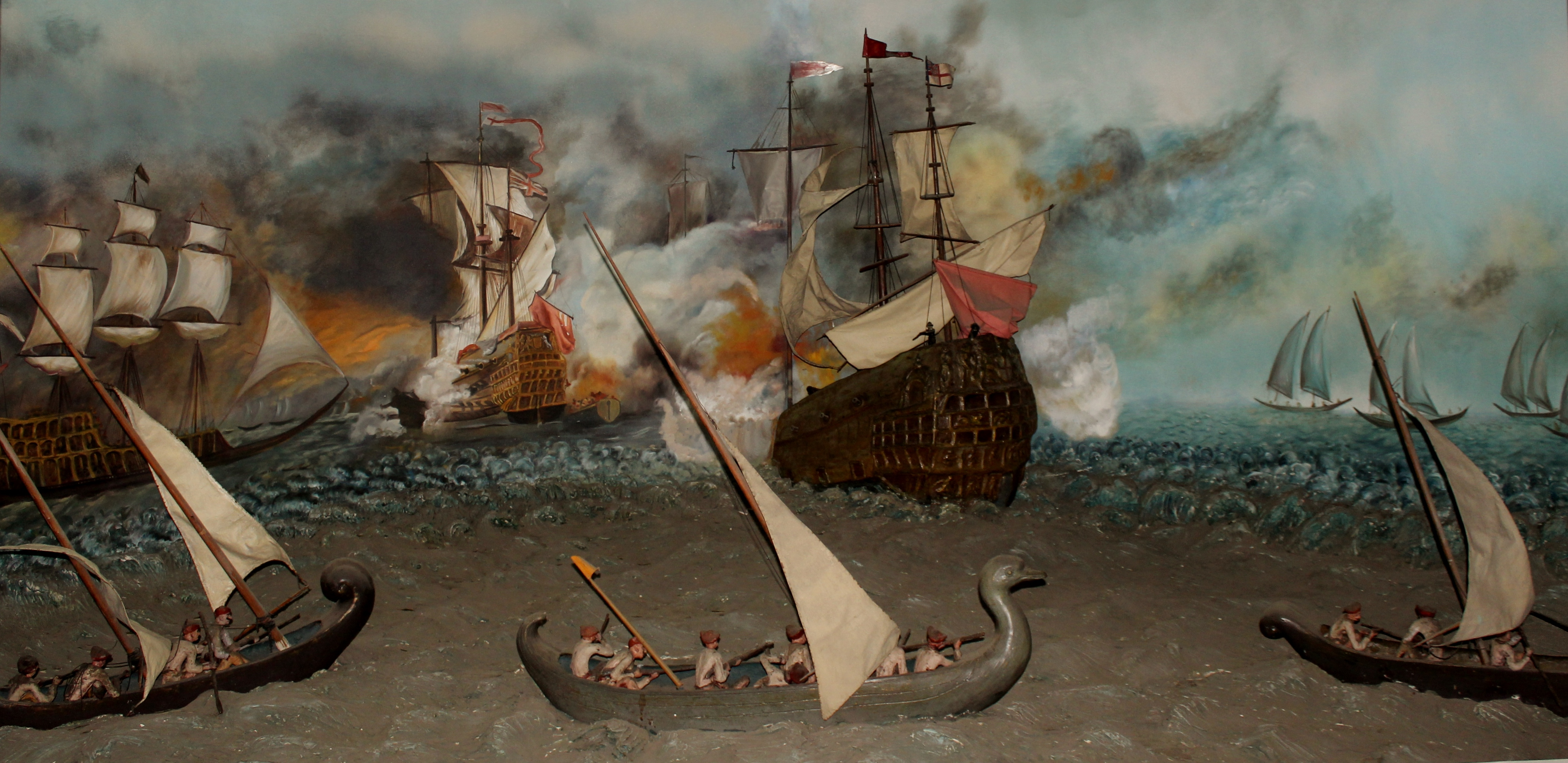
A diorama showing Maratha naval tactics

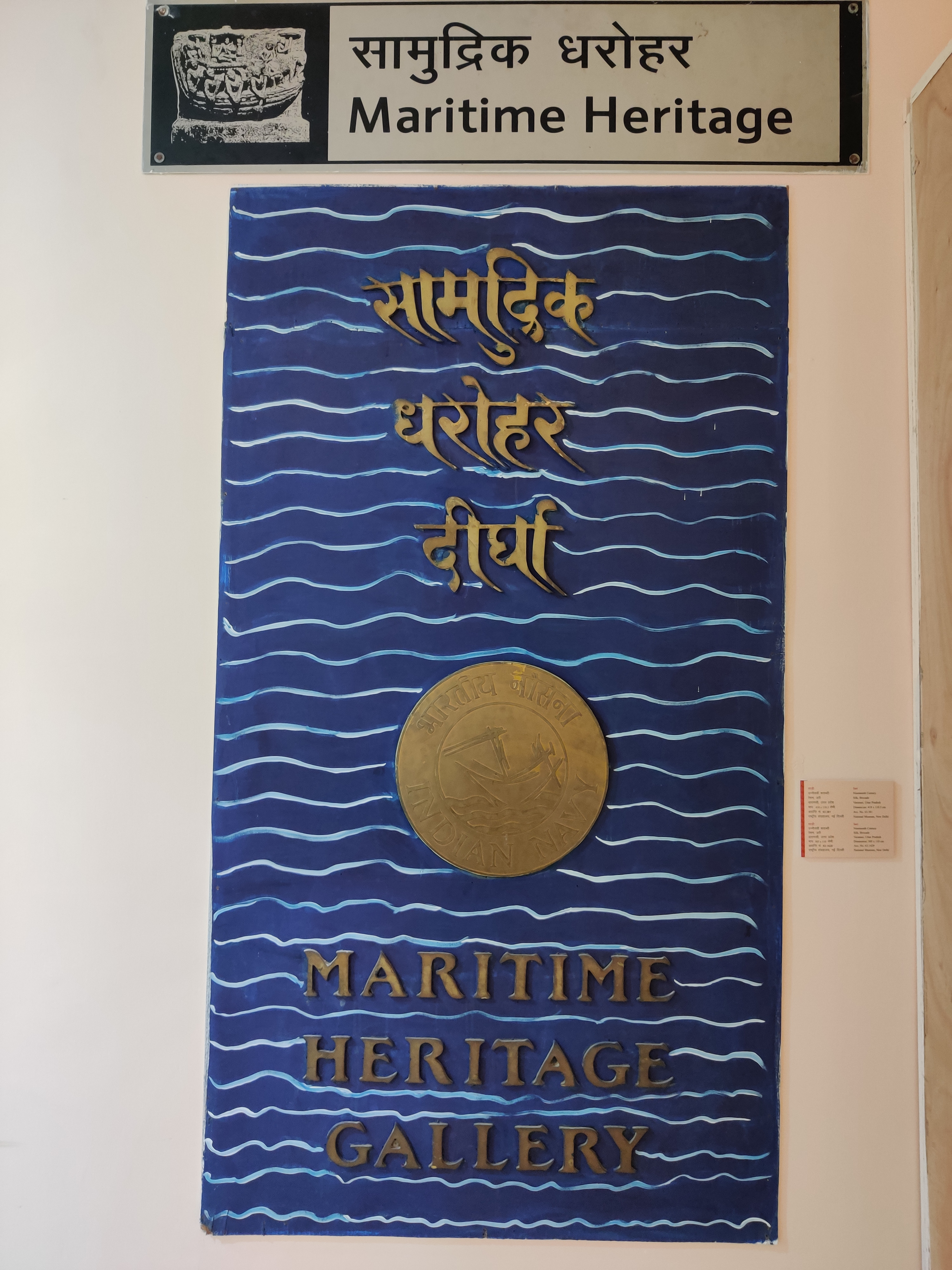
Entrance to the Maritime Heritage Gallery

=== Tanjore and Mysore Paintings Gallery ===
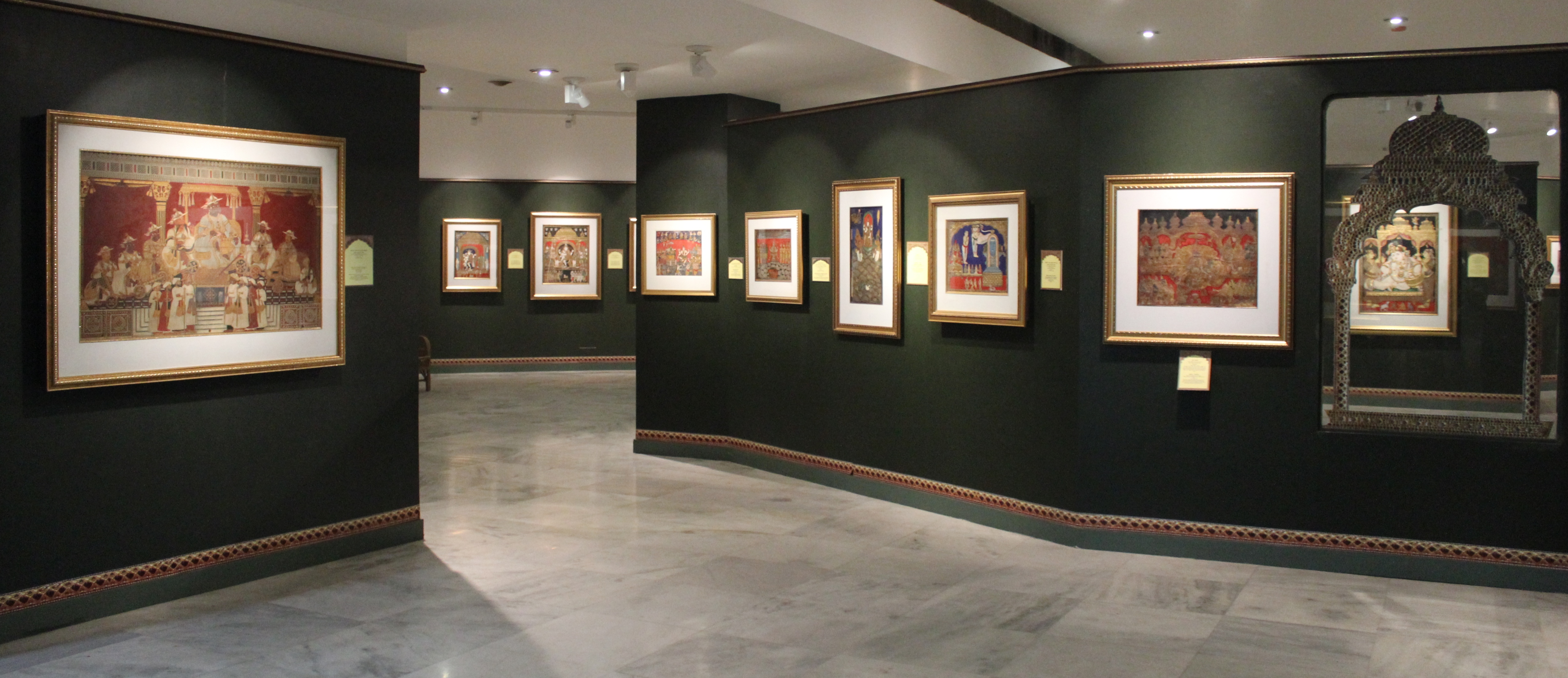
Tanjore & Mysore paintings gallery

This gallery exhibits the paintings from the two famous schools of South India – Tanjore and Mysore. The important themes of Tanjore and Mysore schools include paintings of Vaishnavism portraying images of Hindu Gods Krishna, Rama, Vishnu and his other incarnations and Shaivism portraying various forms of Shiva, Parvati, Kartikeya, Ganesha and other Shaiva deities; and portraits of various kings, saints and royal patrons.

Tanjore paintings, named after the ancient town of Tanjavur in Tamil Nadu employ real gold and silver foil, precious and semiprecious stones, beads, mirrors, and powdered metals besides the use of primary colours- red, green, blue, black and white to depict key figures. The Mysore school of painting sprang in south Karnataka in the reign of Maharaja Mummudi Krishnaraja Wadiyar present a wide variety, from murals to stylistic Mysore paintings on cloth, paper and wood. 88 paintings have been put on show at the gallery and some of the masterpieces include Navaneeta Krishna with Tanjore King Shivaji II (1830 CE), Nataraja Shiva early 19th century, Rama Pattabhisheikha early 19th century, Durbar of Serfoji II (1798–1833) and the Marriage ceremony of Shiva -Parvati and Sita-Rama end of18th century.

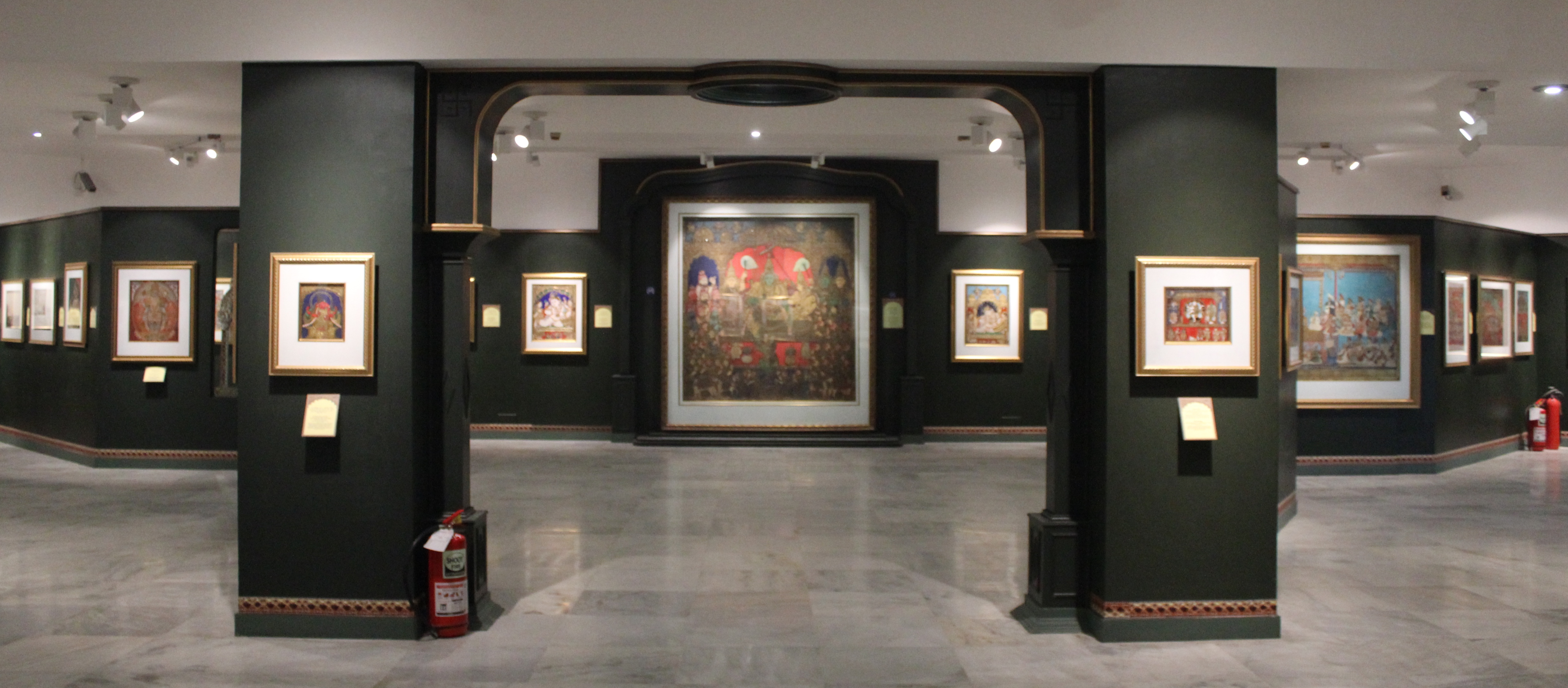
View of the Gallery

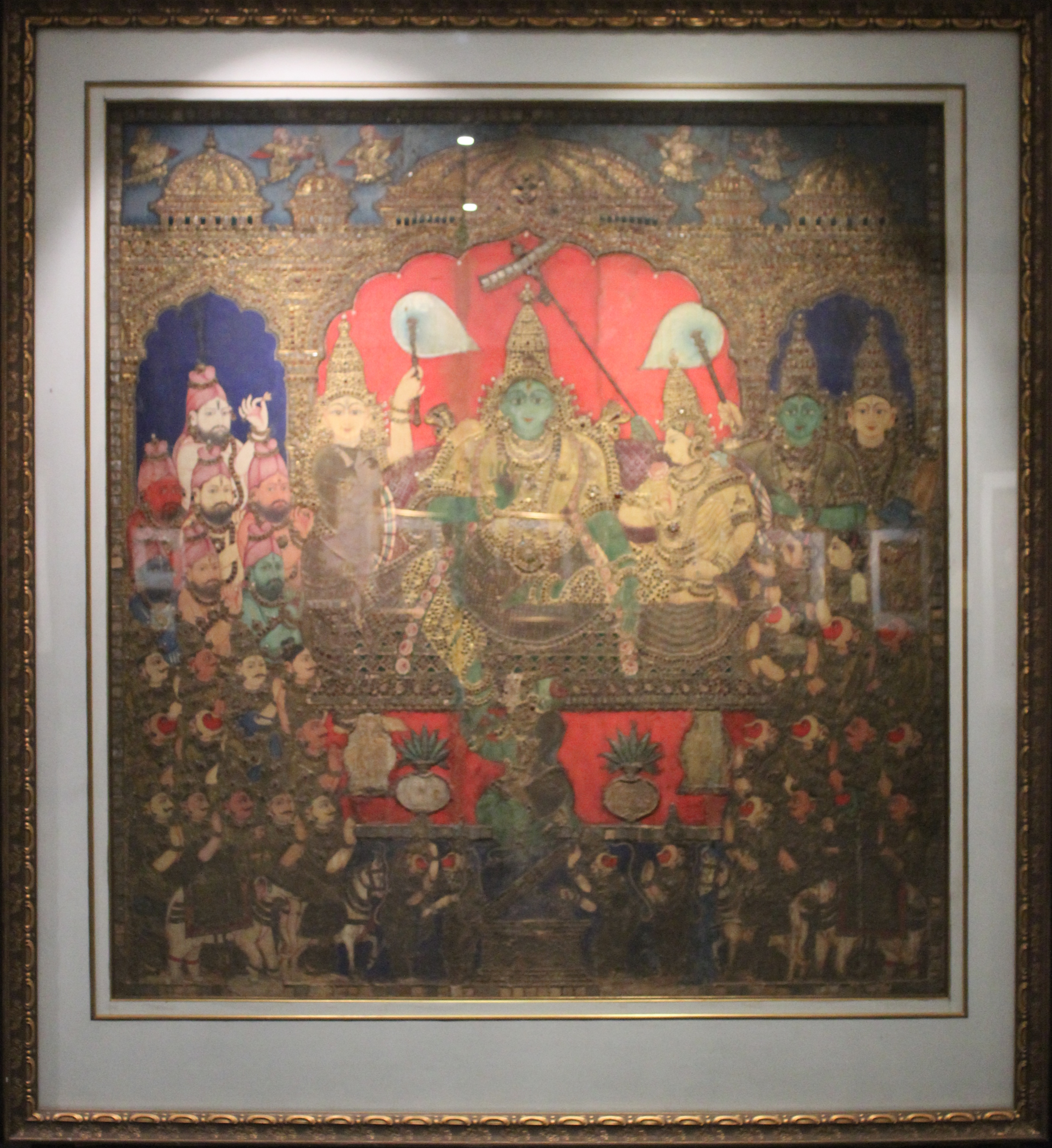
Rama Darbar (Coronation of Rama at Ayodhya)

=== Textiles Gallery ===
The Textiles Gallery exhibits the collection of Indian traditional textiles of the Later Mughal period. Cotton, Silk and Woolen textiles which are woven, printed, dyed and embroidered are exhibited in the gallery.

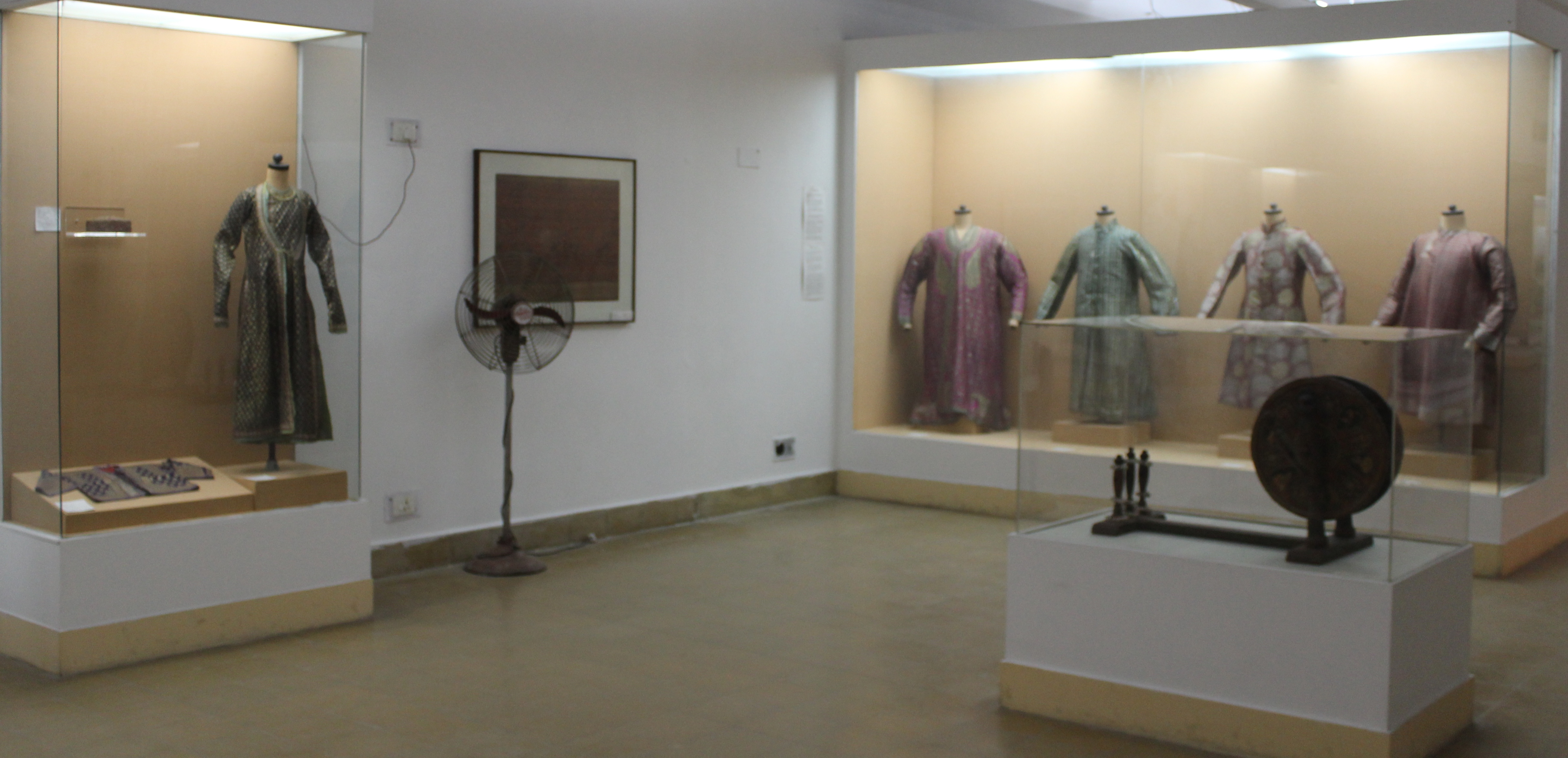
View of the Textiles Gallery

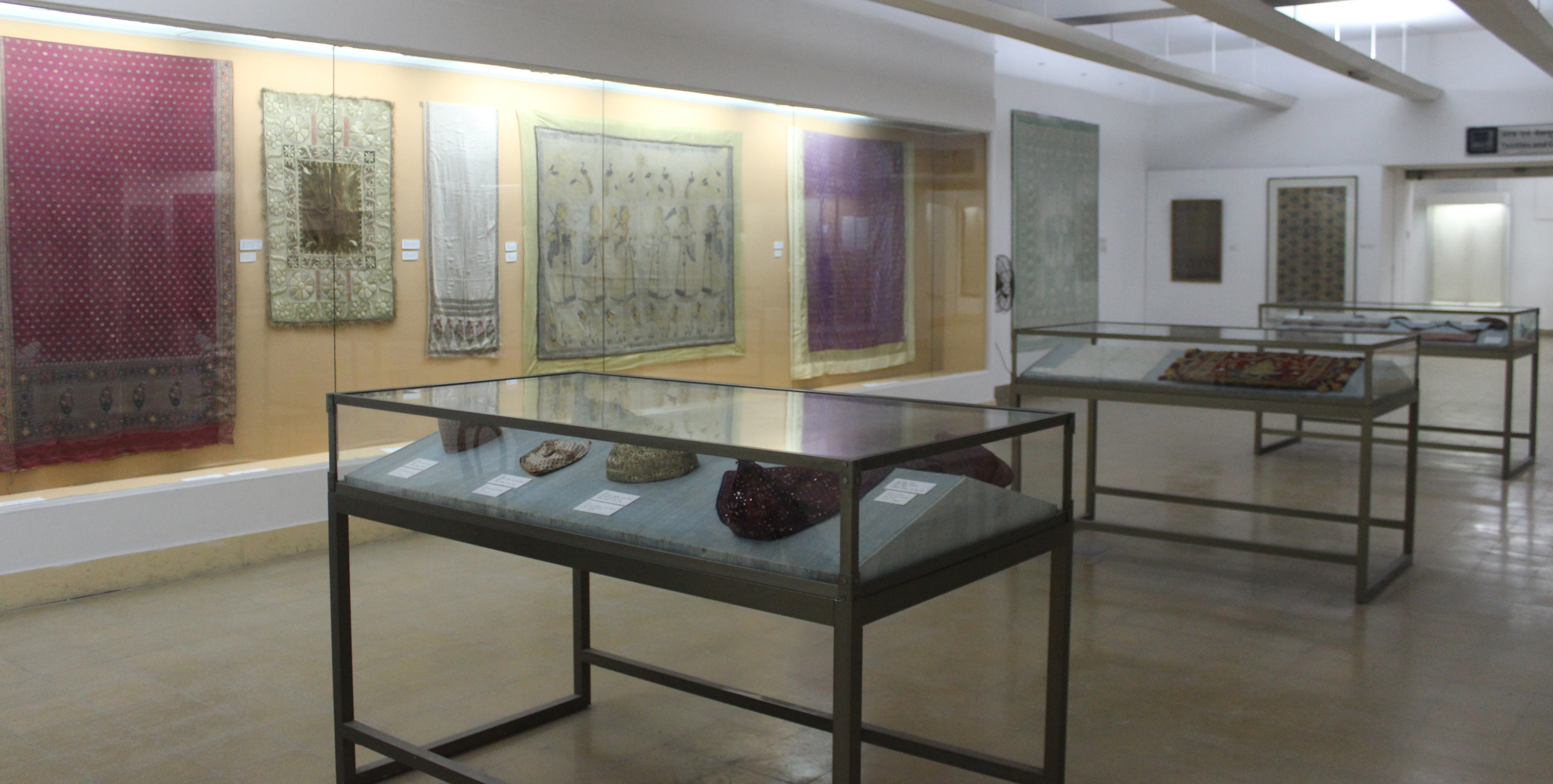
Another view of the Textiles Gallery

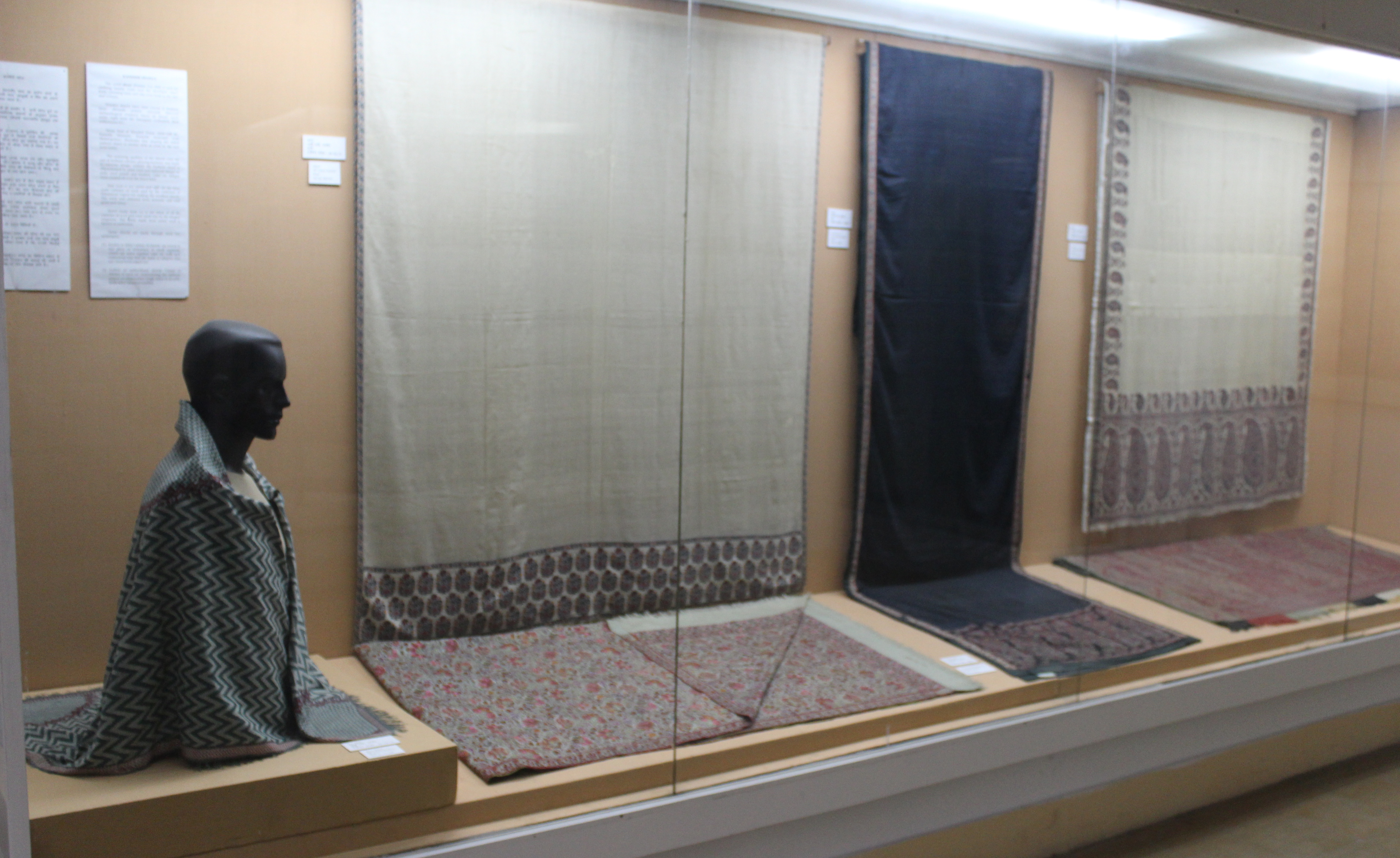
A view of the shawls in the Textiles Gallery. The shawls are from Kashmir

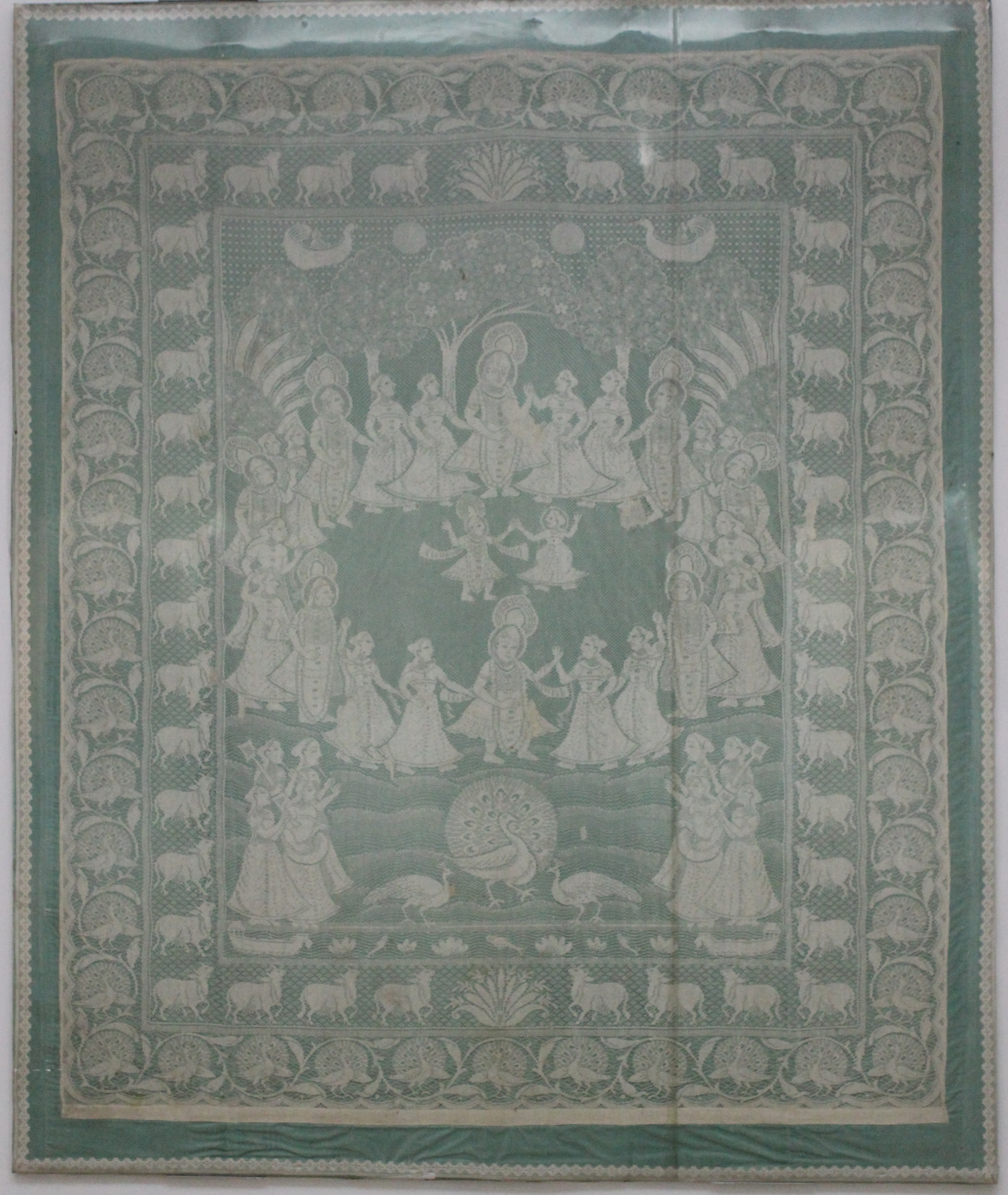
Pichwai on Net

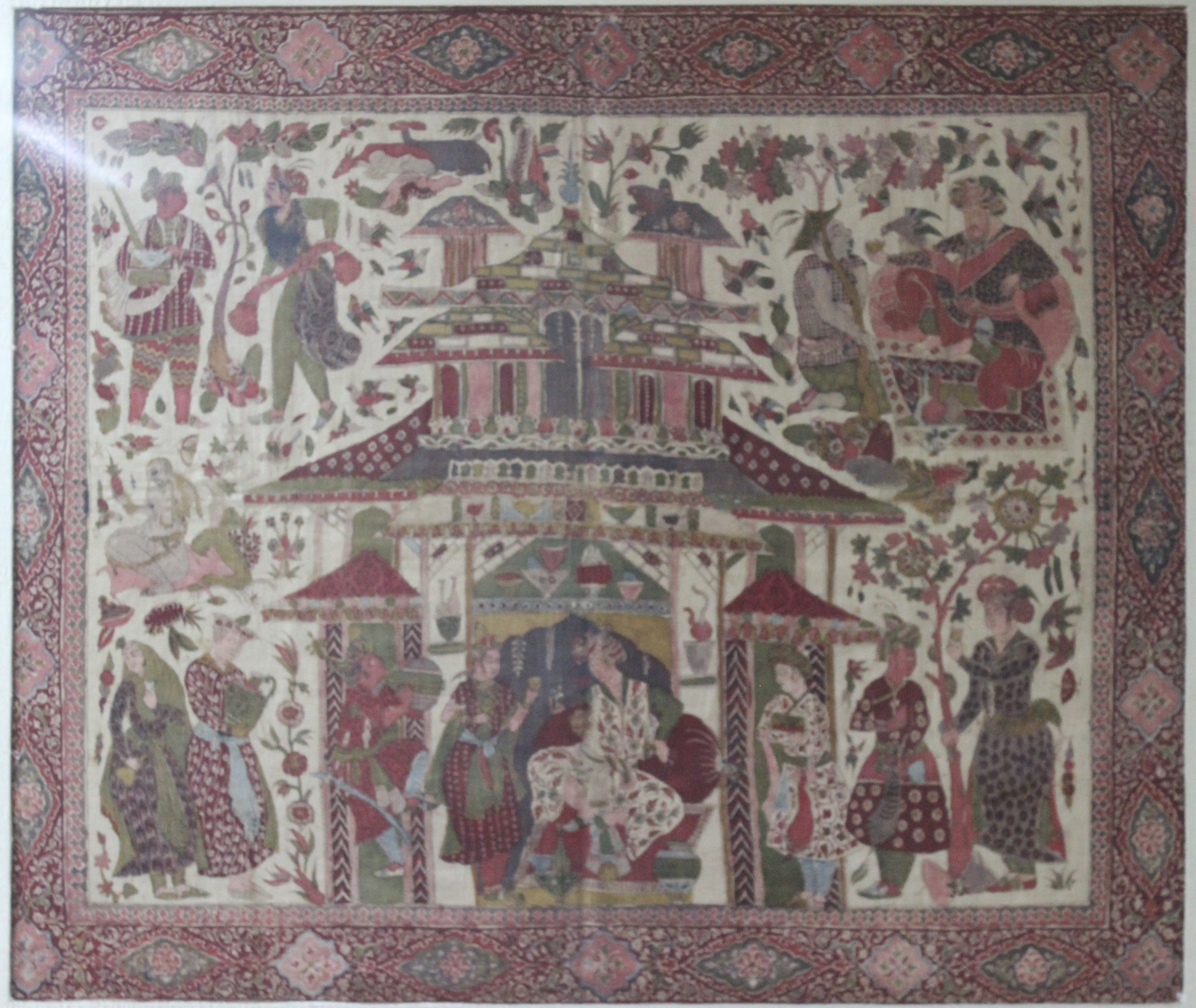
Rumal made by Kalam Kaari Technique

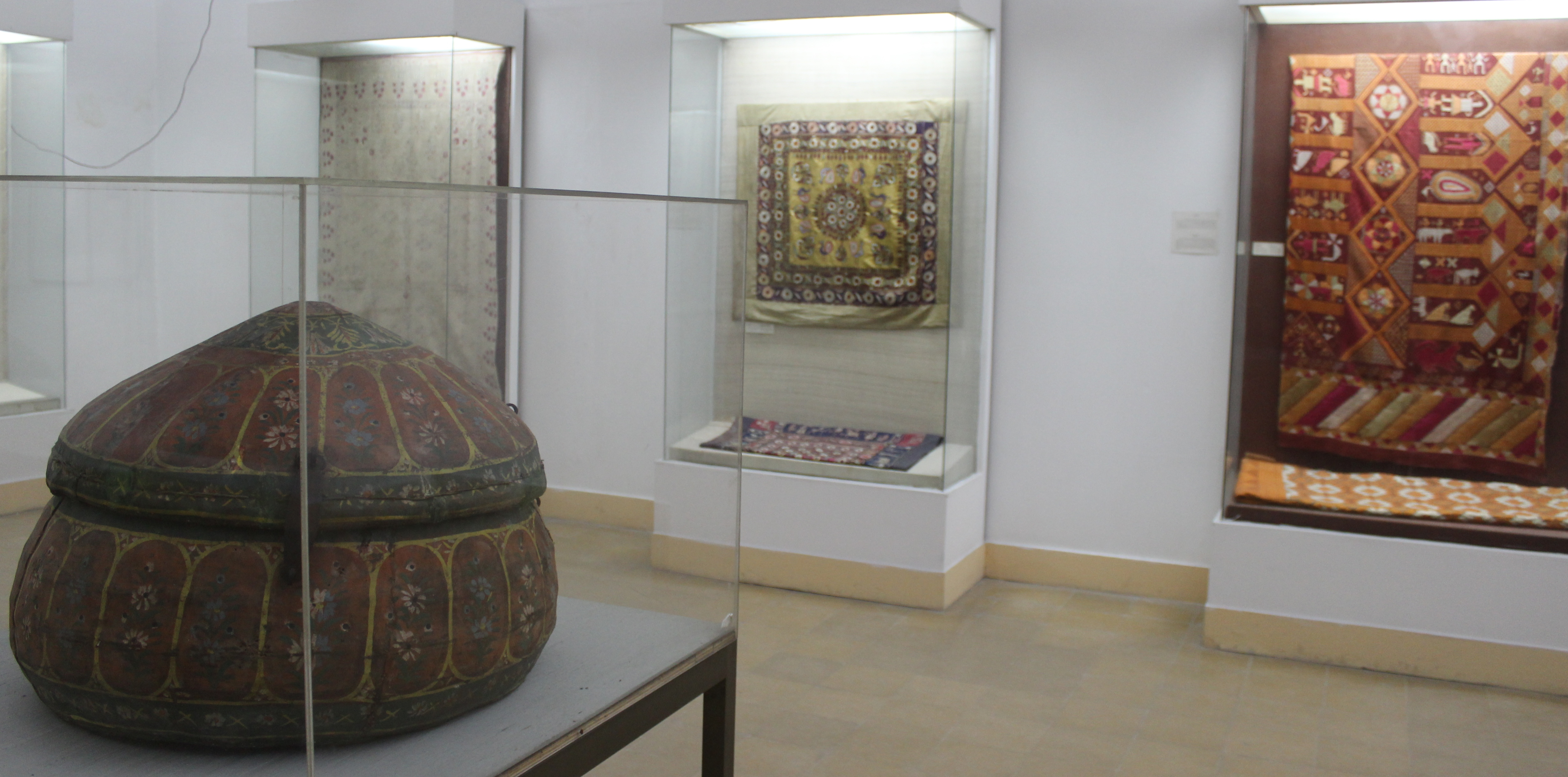
Pitara Box in the Textiles Gallery
- Royal Chamber: It is the particular area which exhibits the use of Textiles in Royal Style. The chamber has embroidered silk carpet on the floor. A cloth ceiling and printed wall clothes cover most of the area. The covers of Pillows have very minute zari and zardozi work on them.
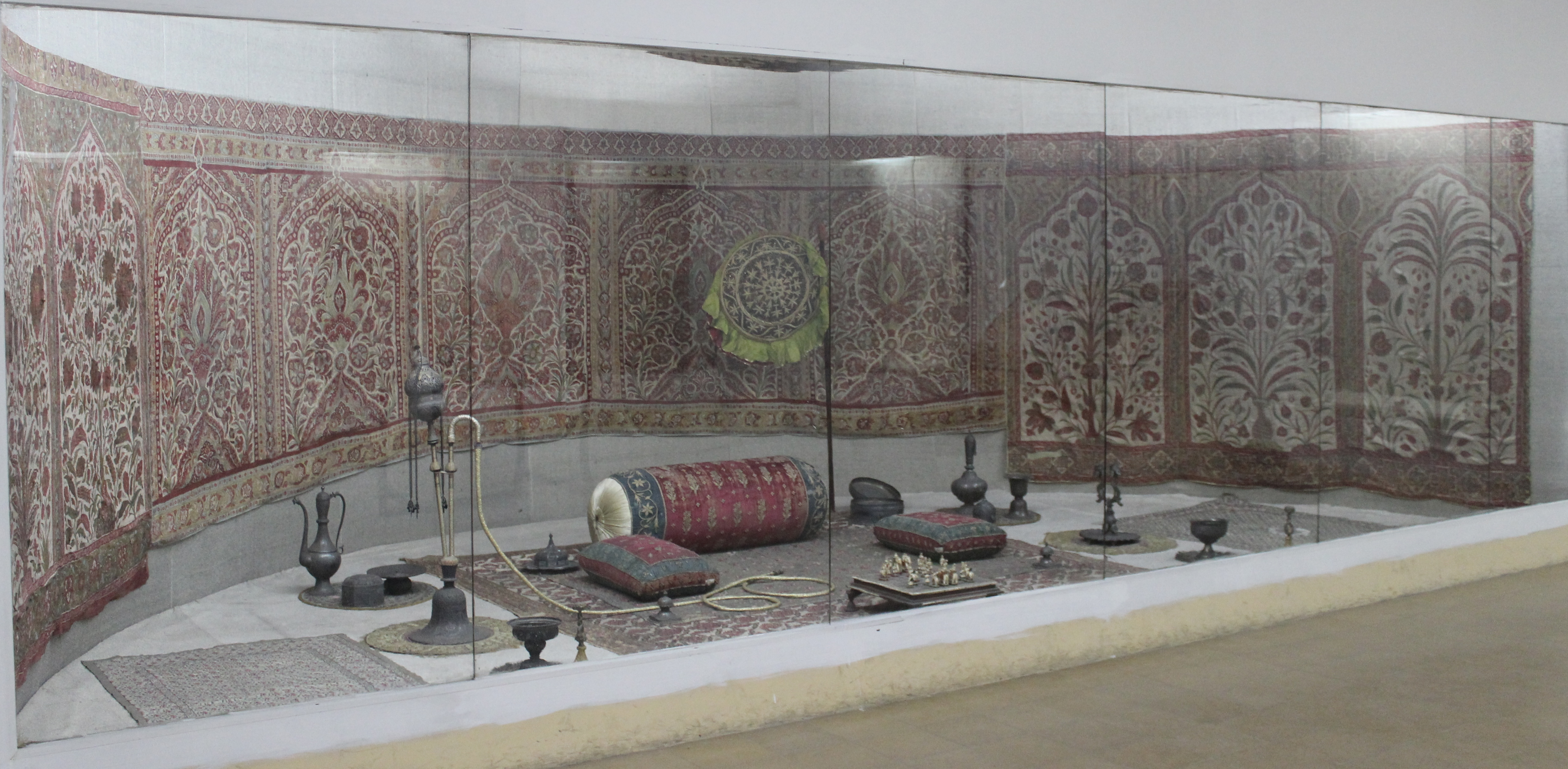
Use of textiles in the tent of rajas

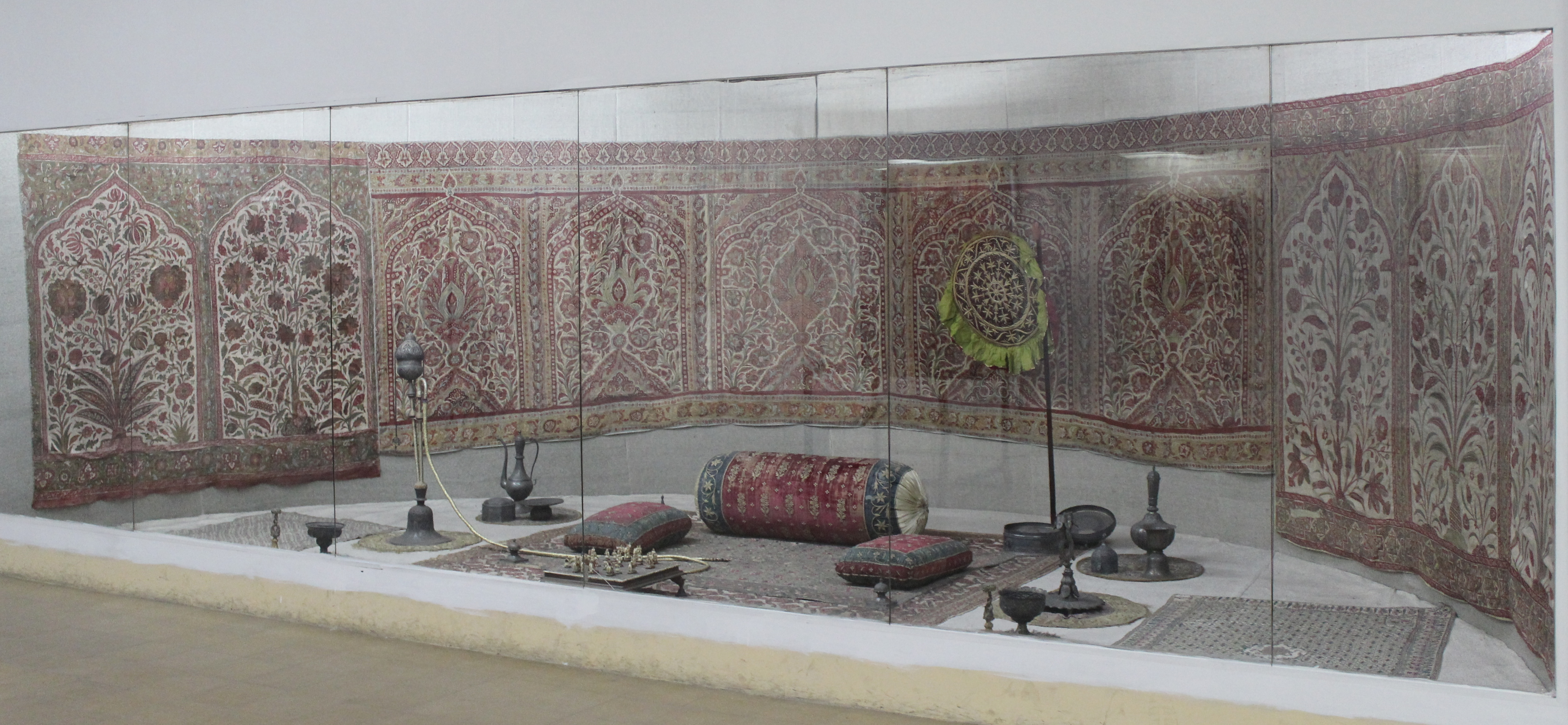
Another view of use of textiles in the tent of rajas

=== Pre-Columbian and Western Arts Gallery ===
The collection of Pre Columbian art donated by Mr & Mrs Heeramaneek represents the principal cultures of the Pre- Columbian world. The Olmec culture from Mexico is characterized by huge stone sculptures representing human heads, as well as small sculptures in jade and other stones 0. The objects are primarily from before Christopher Columbus's discovery of North and South America, including objects from Mexico, Peru, Maya, Inca, North-West coast of America, Panama, Costa Rica and El Salvador.

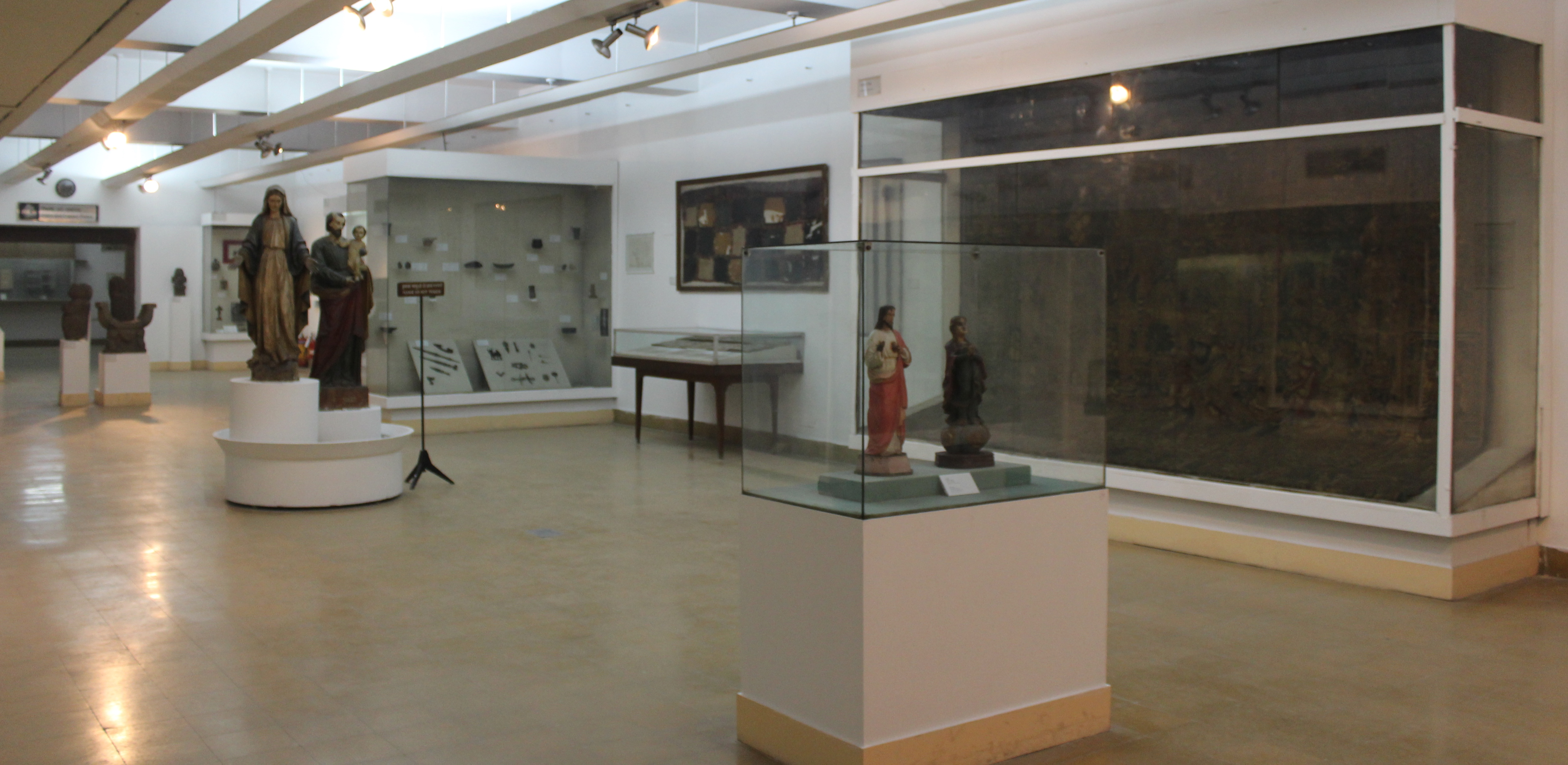
View of the gallery containing artefacts from the pre-Columbian times

== Anthropology Department ==
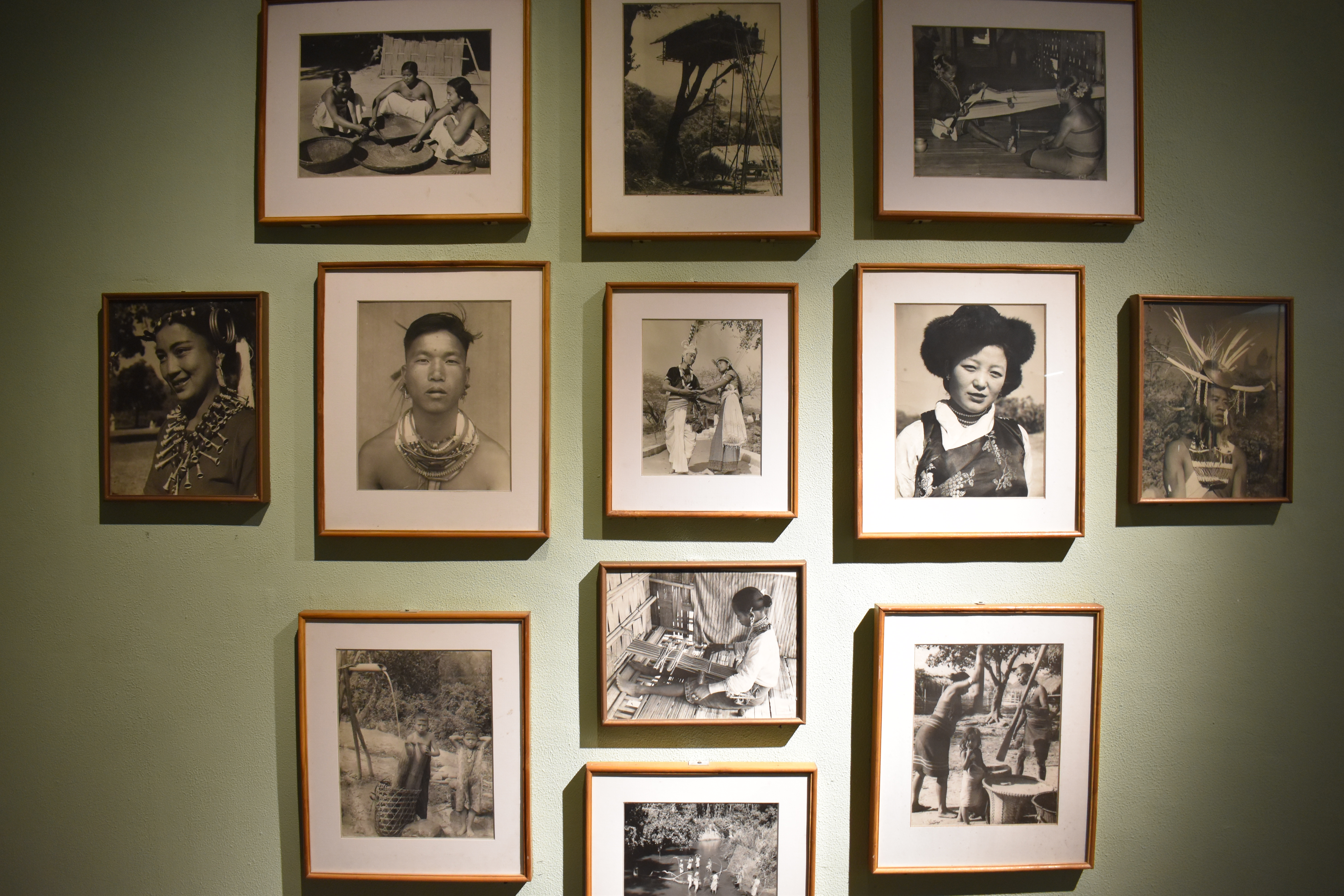
Photo Exhibit of North-Eastern Tribes

The Anthropology Department of National Museum has a collection of objects of ethnographic interest that has been acquired over the years through exploratory expeditions as well as valuable gifts from private collections. The Ethnic Art gallery exhibits examples of tribal and folk art as part of a larger heritage.

=== Tribal Lifestyle of North East India Gallery ===
This gallery is dedicated to the states of North-East India. The eight states of the North East are called Seven Sisters and One Brother (Sikkim) States. The eight states have a wealth of cultural handicraft, performing arts and unique traditions. This gallery exhibits traditional artefacts such as dresses, apparels, headgears, ornaments, paintings, basketry, wood carvings, smoking pipes and articles of personal adornments of various tribal groups.

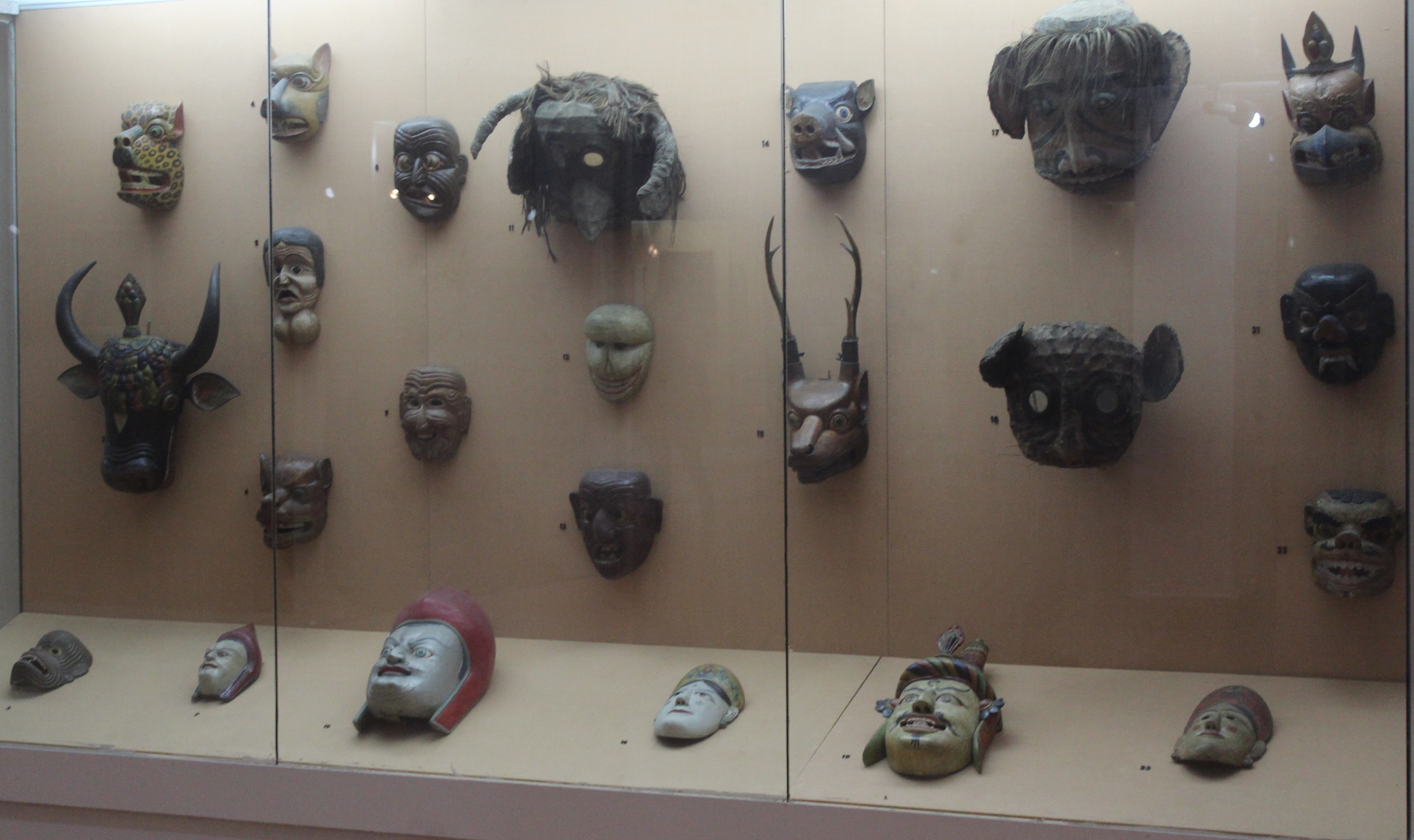
A View of the Different Masks Present in the North East Tribal Lifestyle Gallery
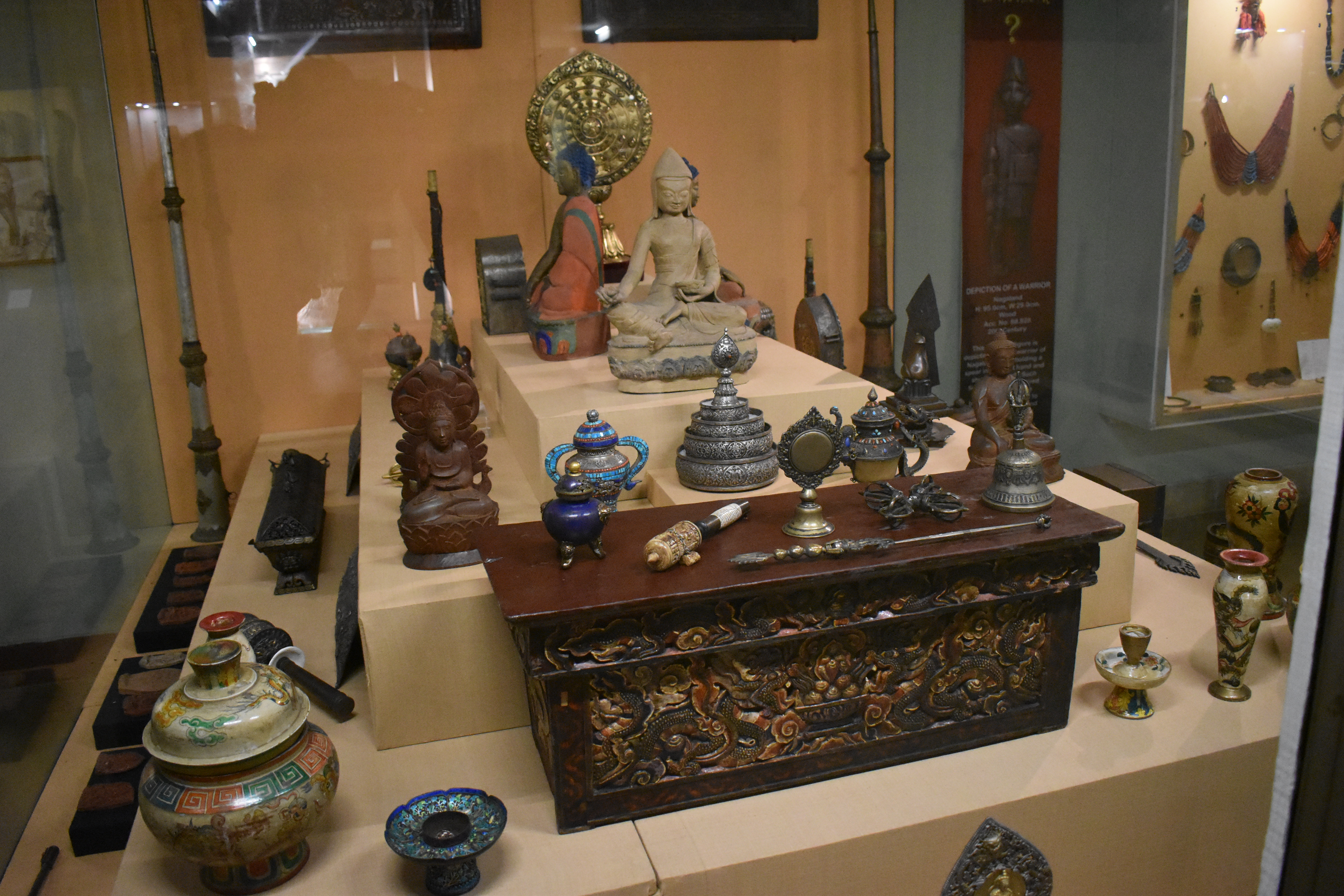
Buddha Statutes and Other Artefacts

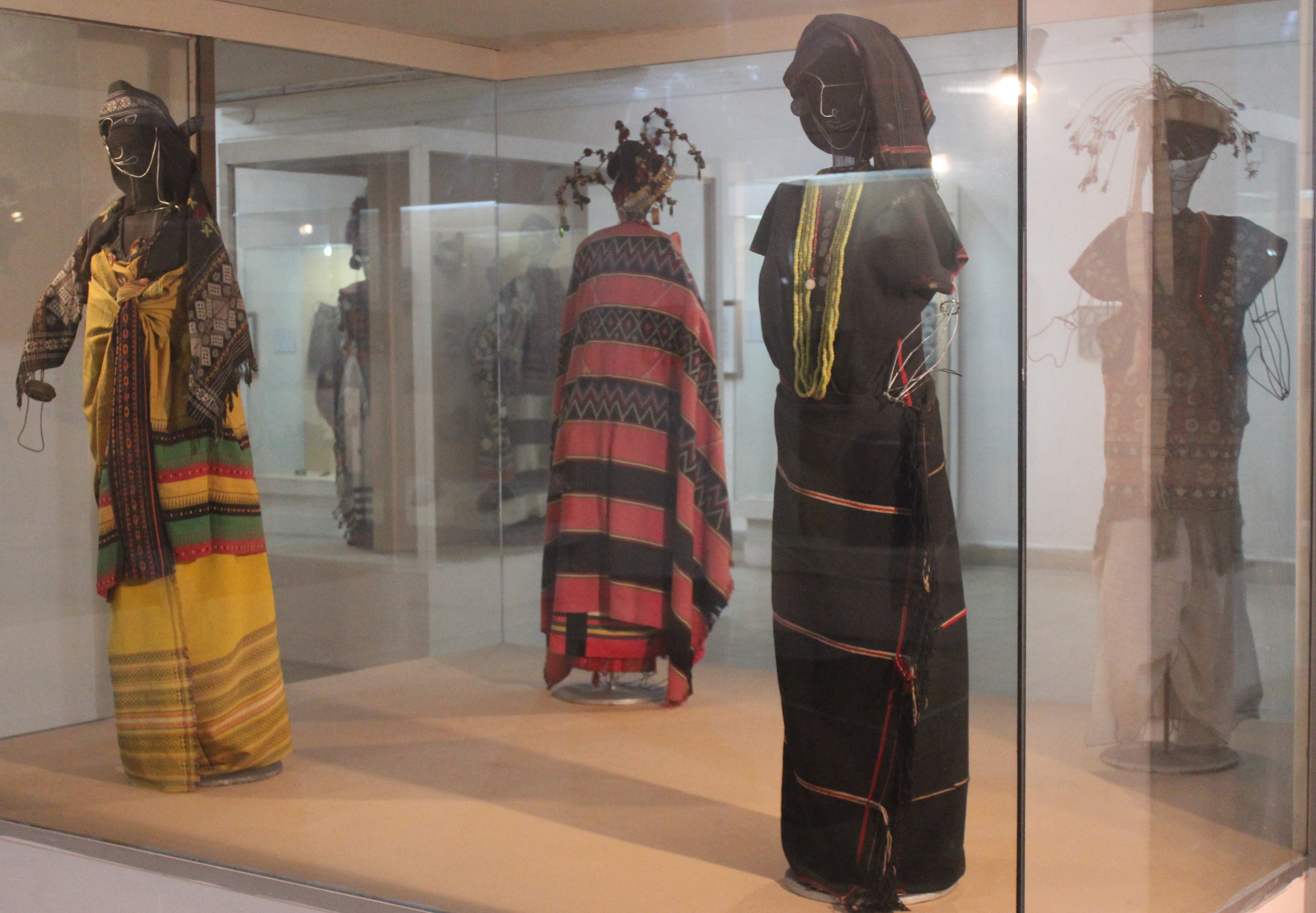
A View of the North East Tribal Lifestyle Gallery

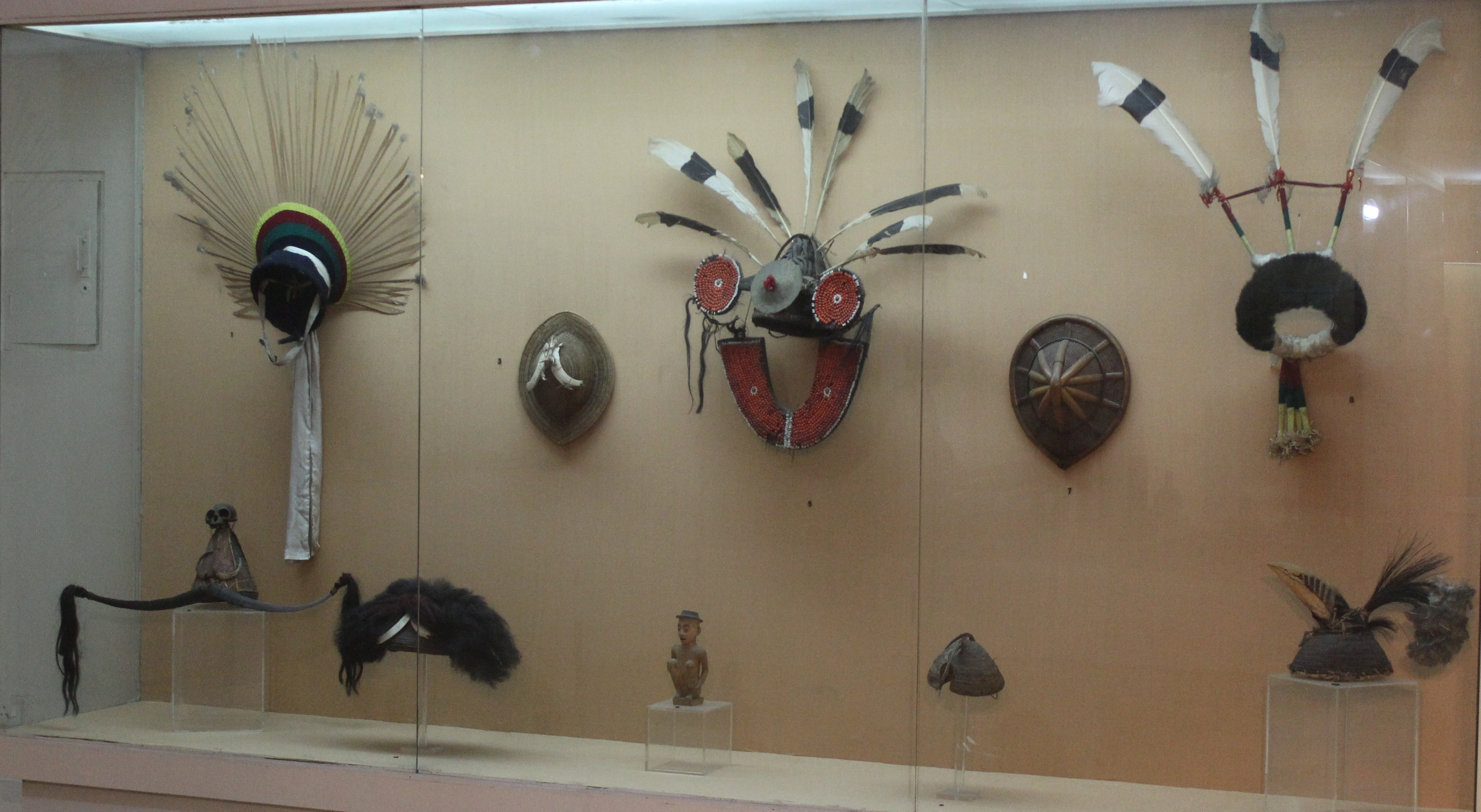
A View of the Different Headgears in the Tribal Lifestyle Gallery

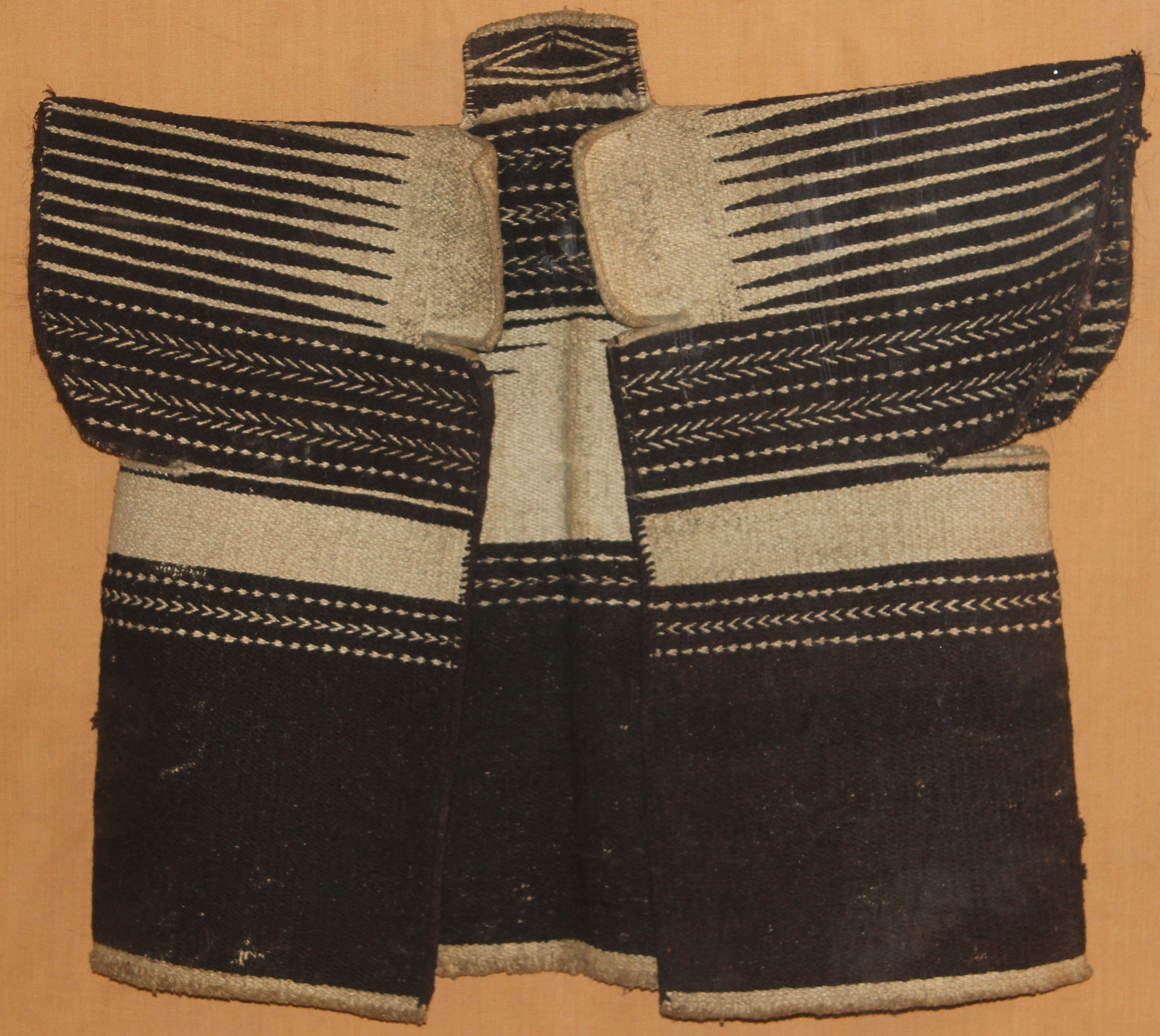
Coat made up of Fibre, Human Hair and Cotton

=== Sharan Rani Bakliwal Musical Instruments Gallery ===
The collection on display in the Musical Instrument Gallery was donated to the museum by Padamshree (Late) Mrs. Sharan Rani Backliwal, India's Sarod Maestro. This gallery has a collection of musical instruments in tribal, folk and classical groups. There are also a few 19th-century Western instruments. The collection is divided into three parts such as Wind Instruments, String Instruments and Percussion Instruments. This gallery also has a sculpture made in bamboo of Goddess Saraswati playing the Veena.

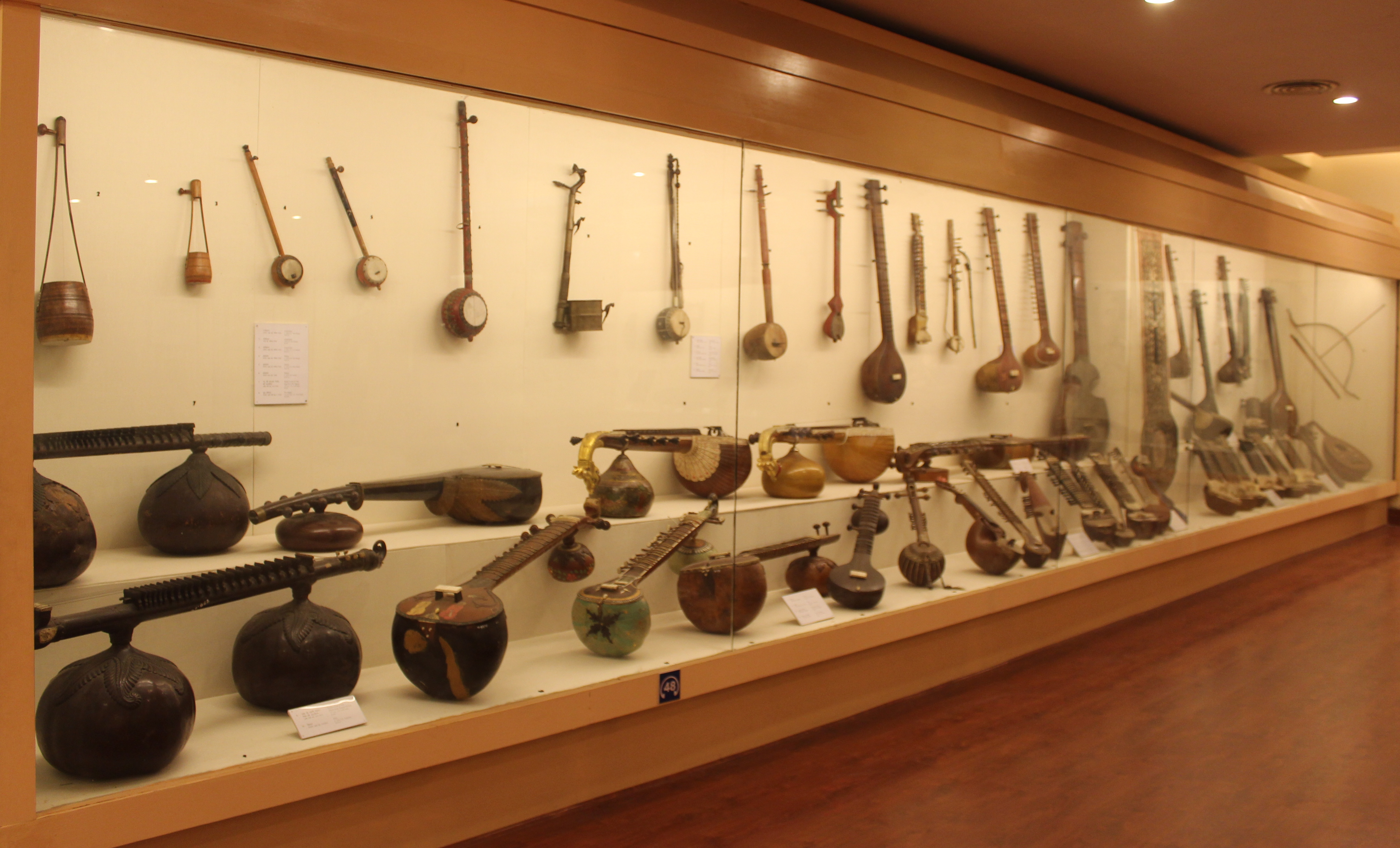
View of the Musical Instruments

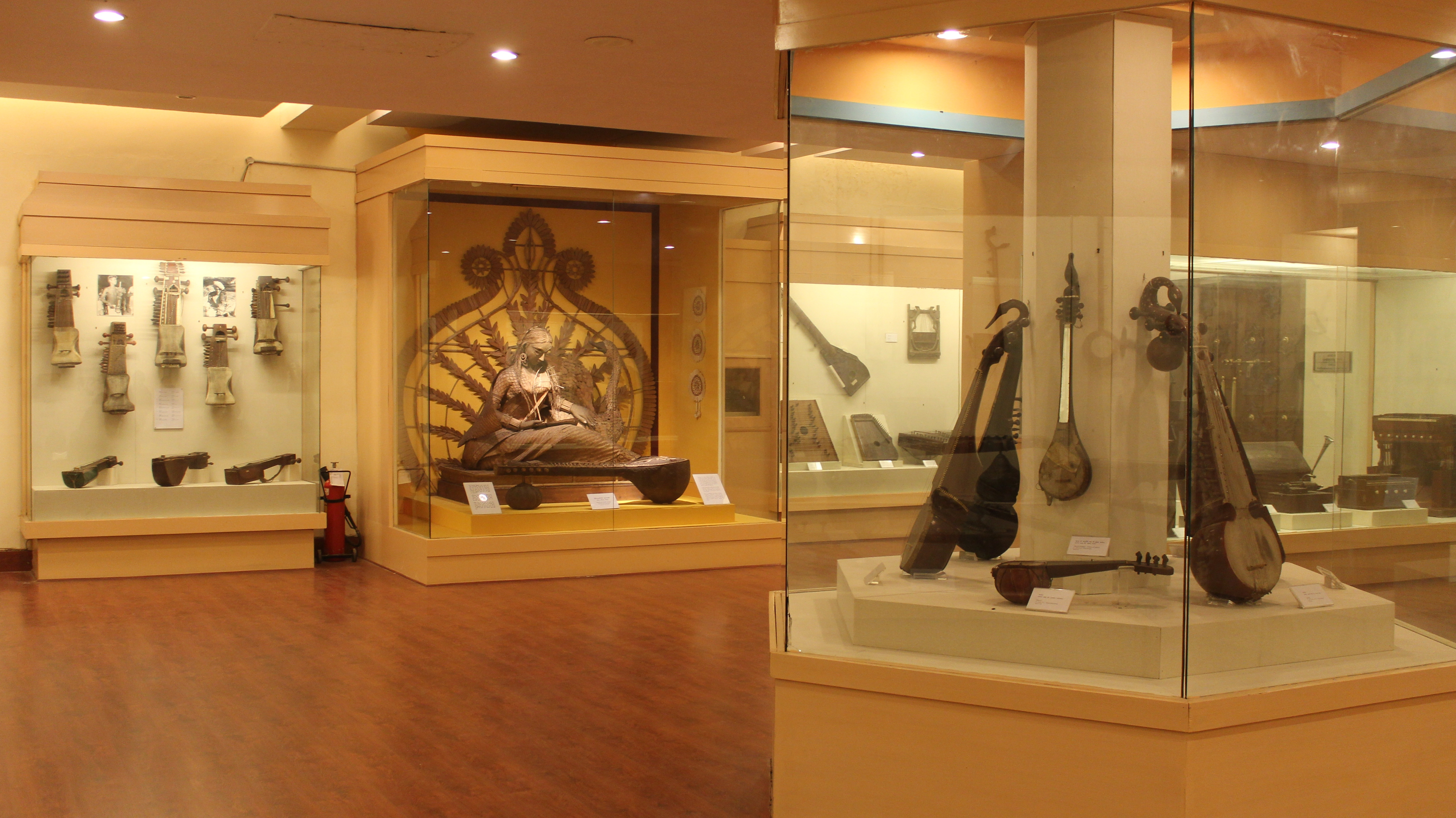
Larger view of the Gallery

== Wood Carving Gallery ==
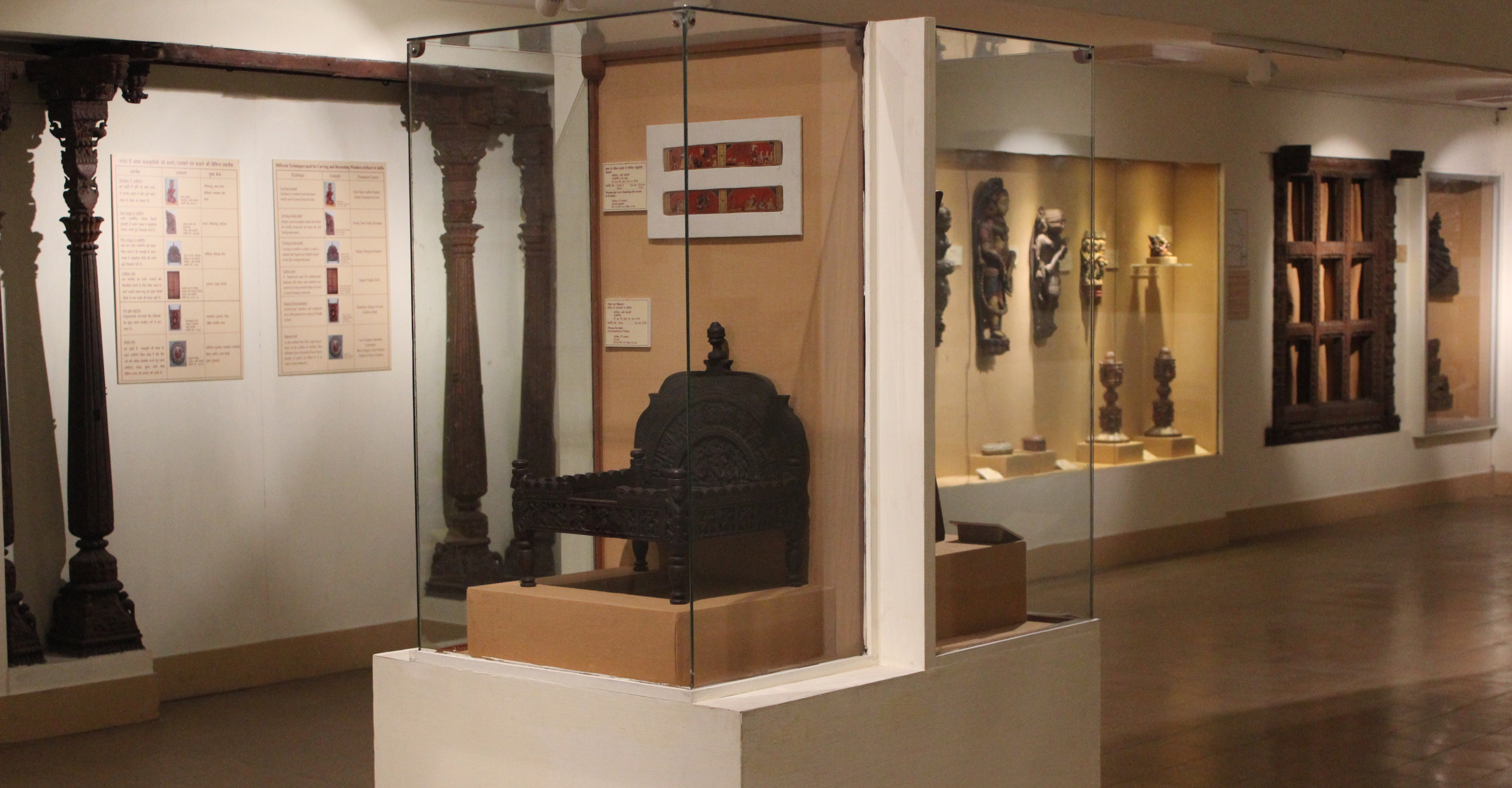
A view of the Wood Carving Gallery

The Wood Carving Gallery of the museum not only exhibits artefacts from India, but also from Nepal and Tibet. This gallery gives glimpses of India's wood carving tradition mainly belonging from 17th to 19th centuries illustrating the different styles of wood carvings from Rajasthan, Gujarat, Odisha and South India. Collections on display include decorative and utilitarian objects, architectural elements and sculptures. A square pillar with a capital of five feet height dated 9th century is the earliest wood carving specimen in National Museum. The gallery has been curated by Anamika Pathak.

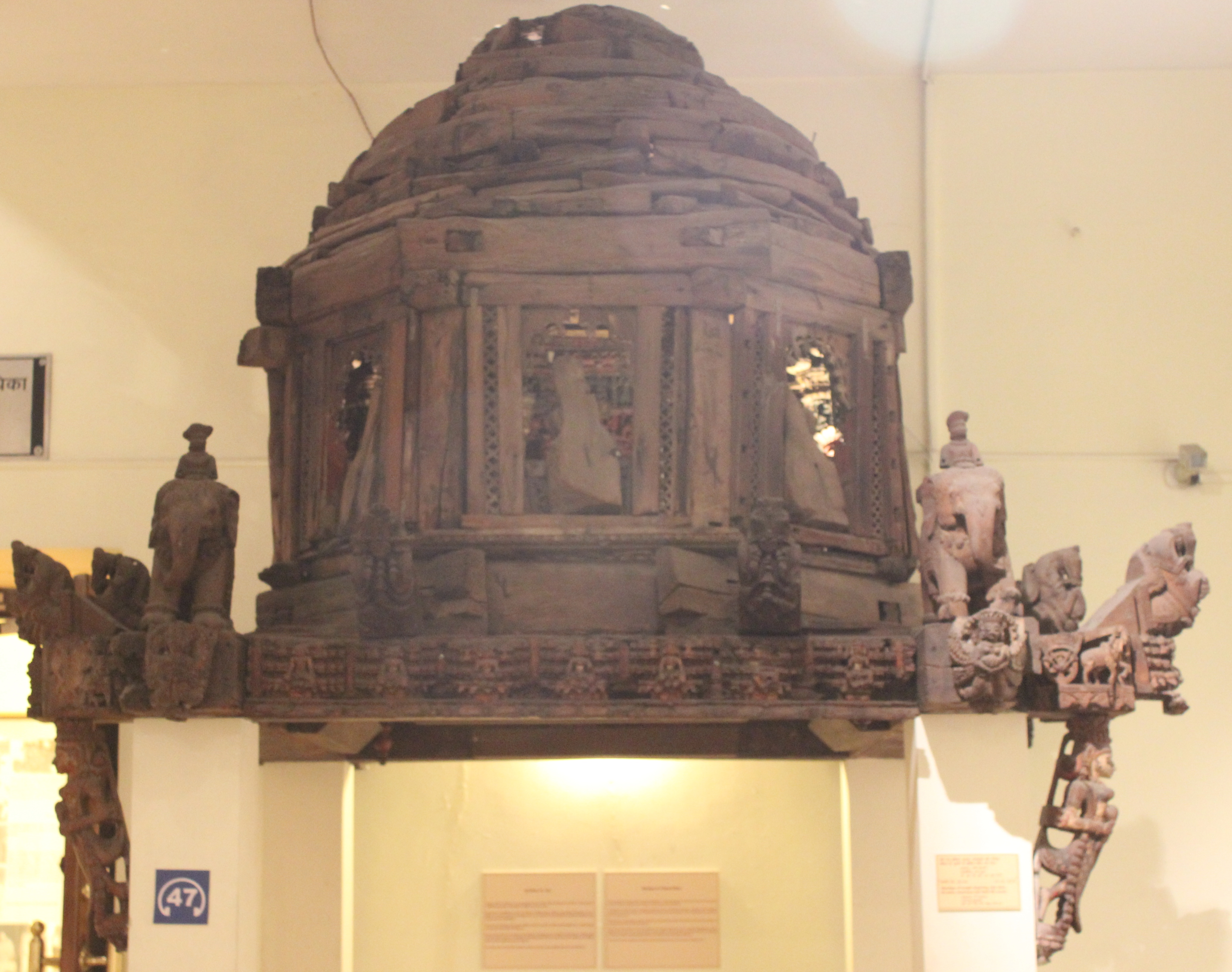
The Mandap kept in the Wood Carving gallery

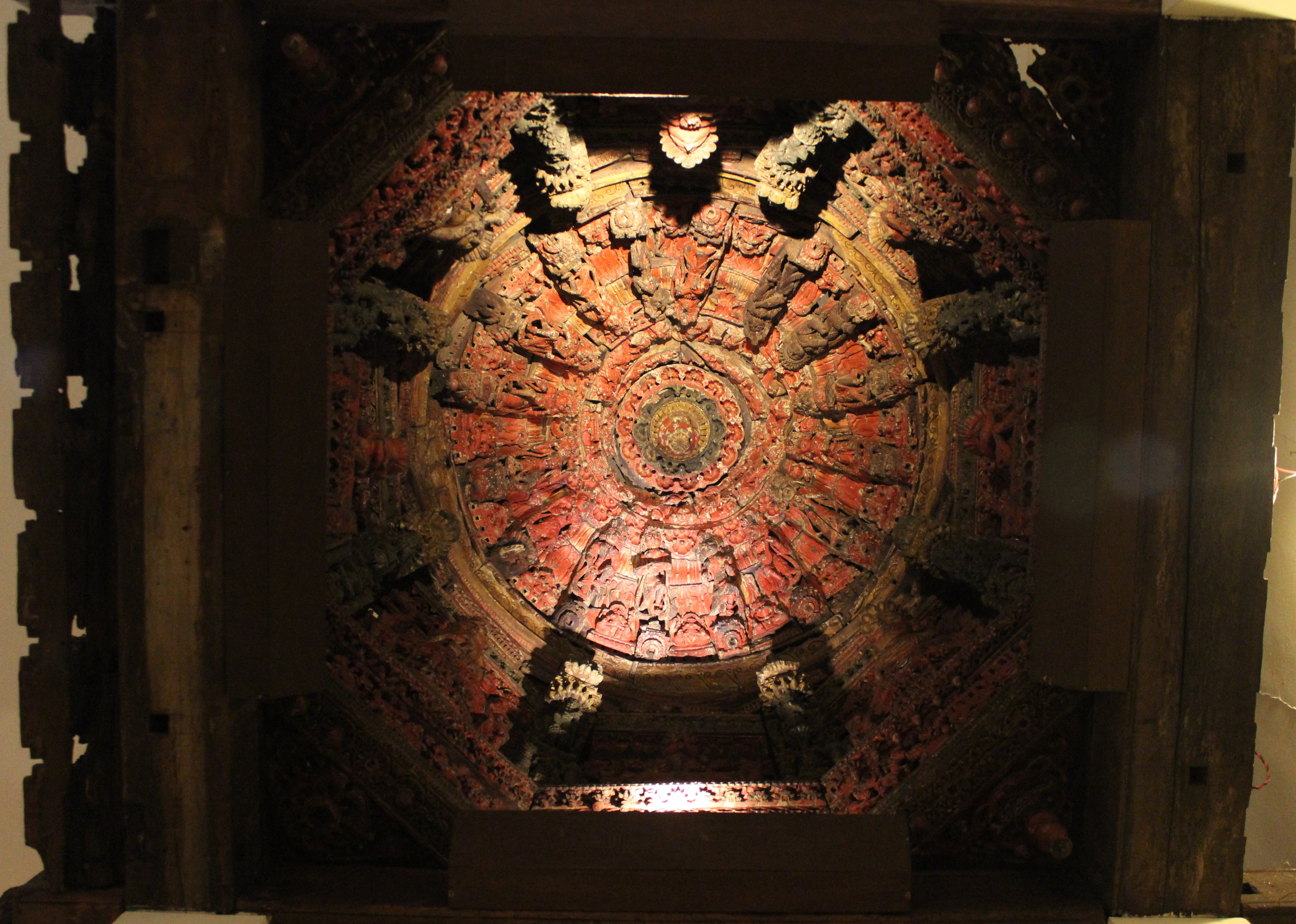
Inner view of the Wooden Mandap

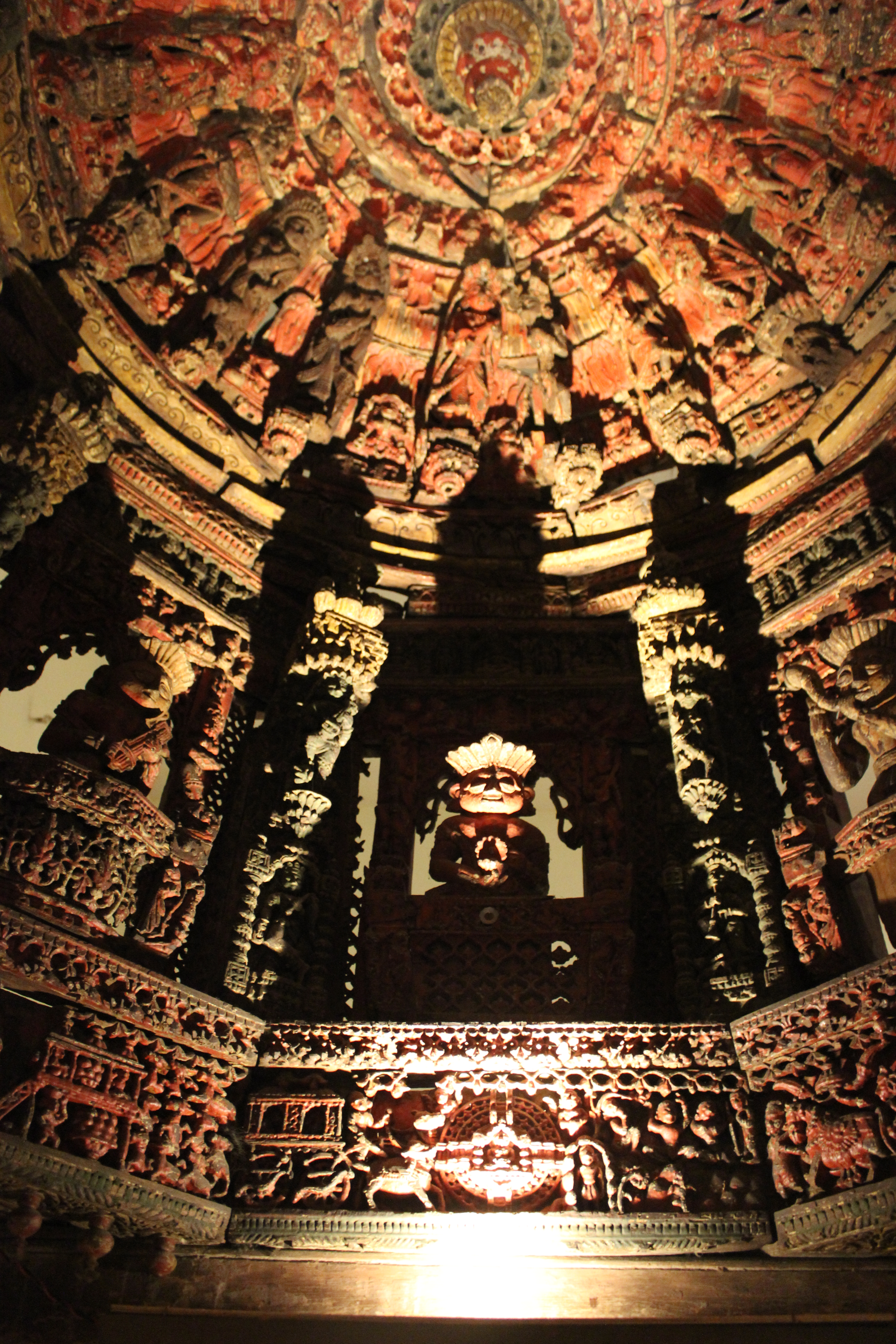
Inner view of the Wooden Mandap

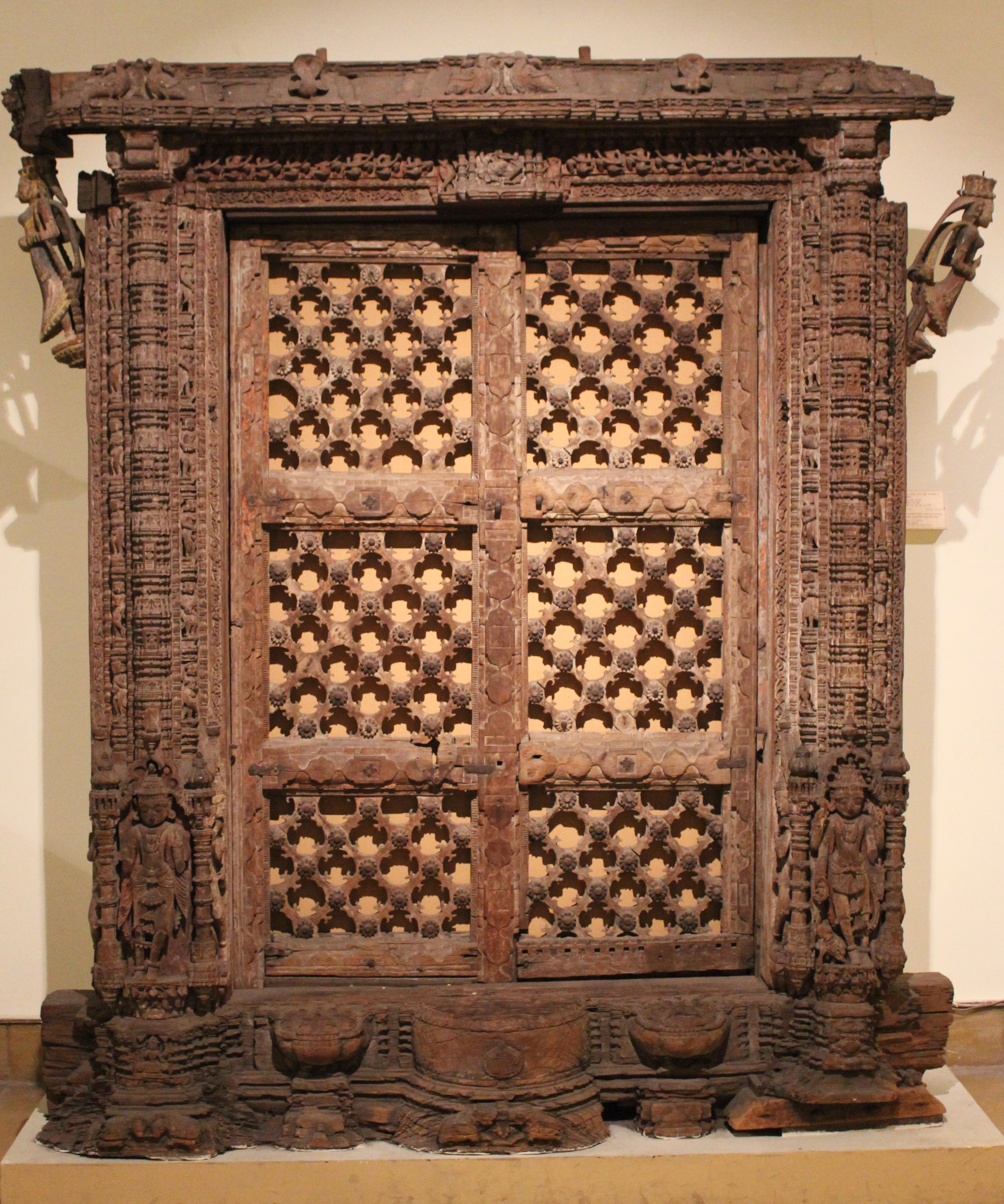
Carved Door from Gujarat

== Arms and Armour Gallery ==
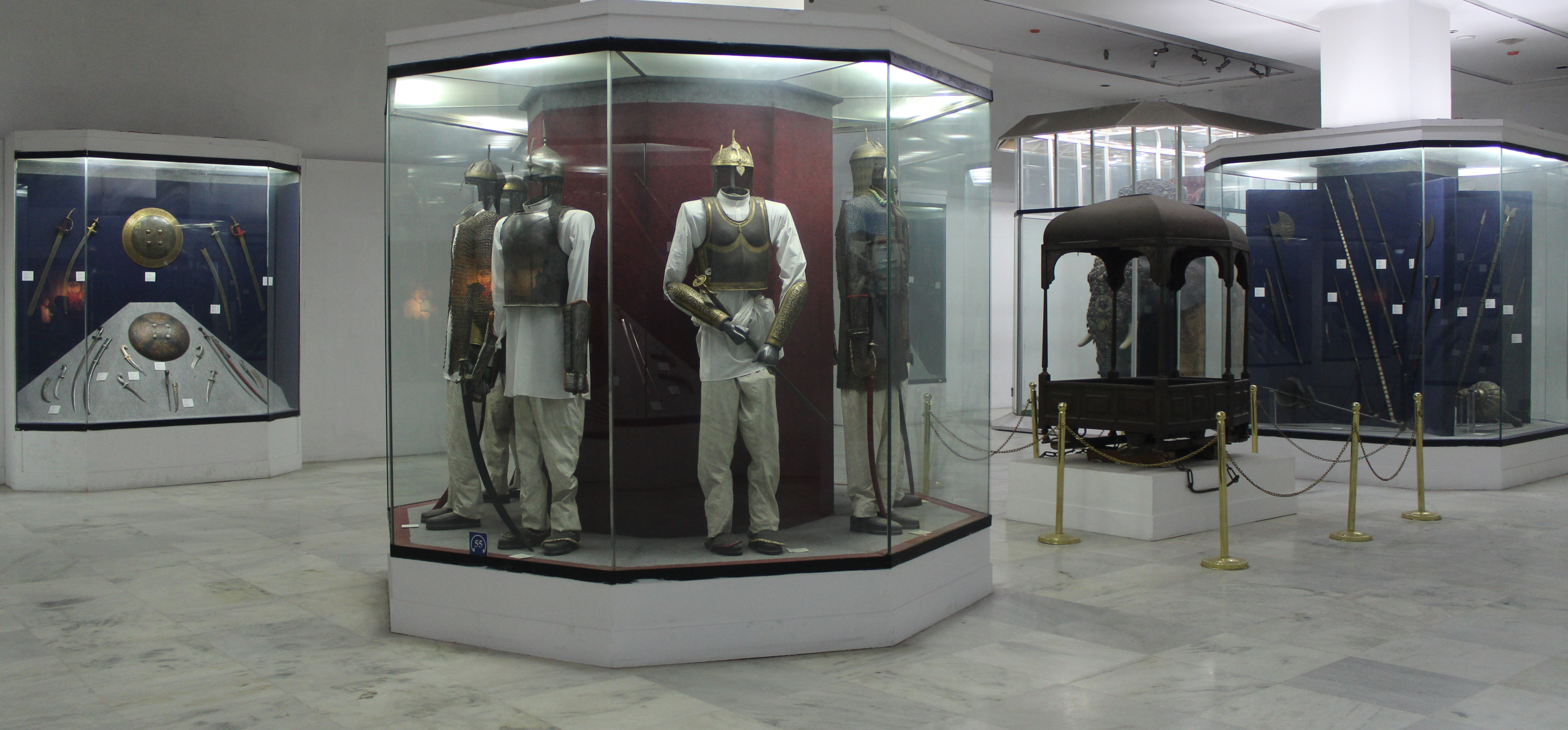
A view of the gallery

This gallery exhibits arms from the Stone Age up to the Modern Age. The collection comprises edged weapons, projectiles, smashing weapons, sacrificial and ritual weapons, firearms, armour for men and animals, ornamental and war accessories. The collection is predominantly Mughal in addition to Maratha, Sikh, Rajput arms which are also well represented.

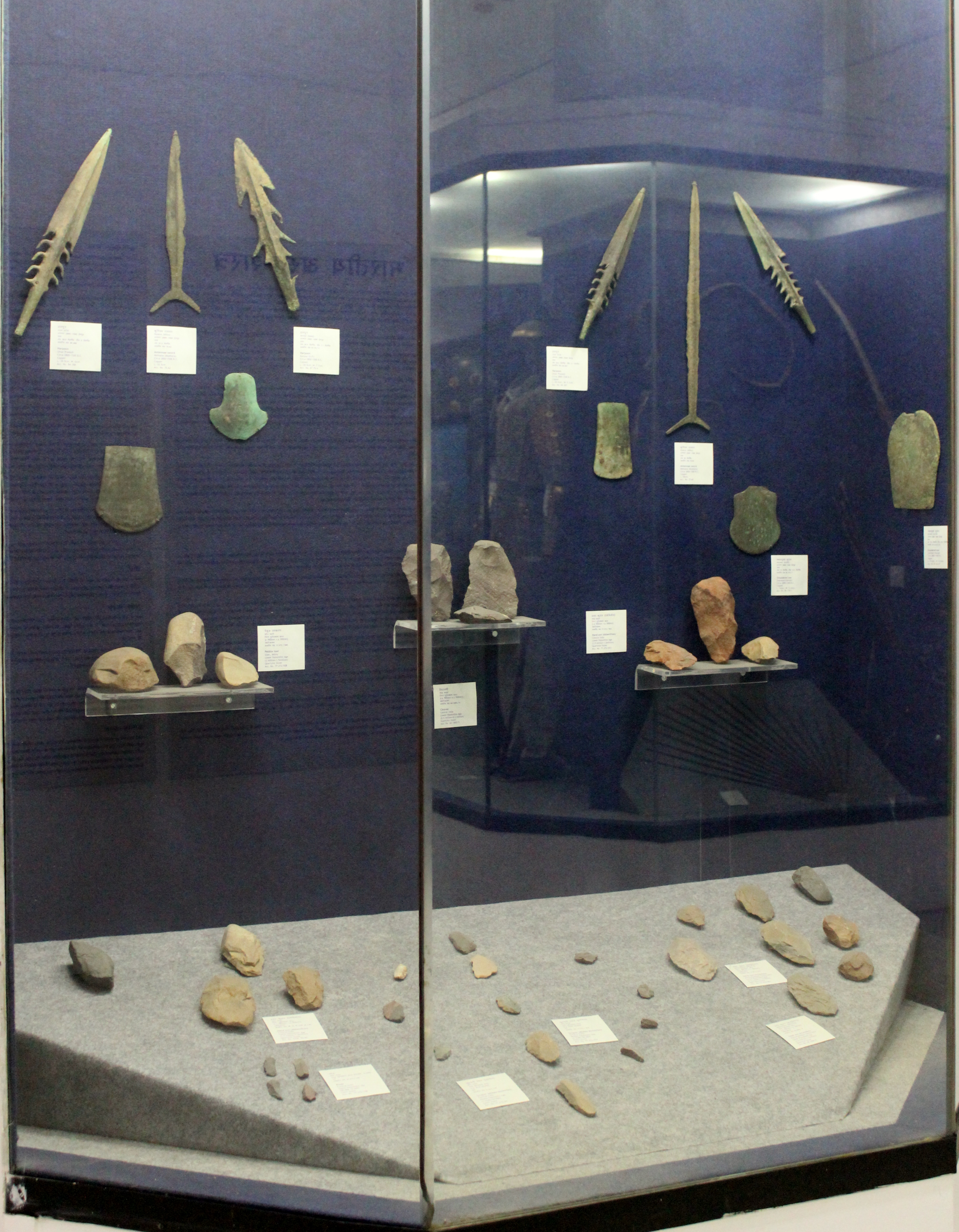
Arms from Stone & Bronze Age

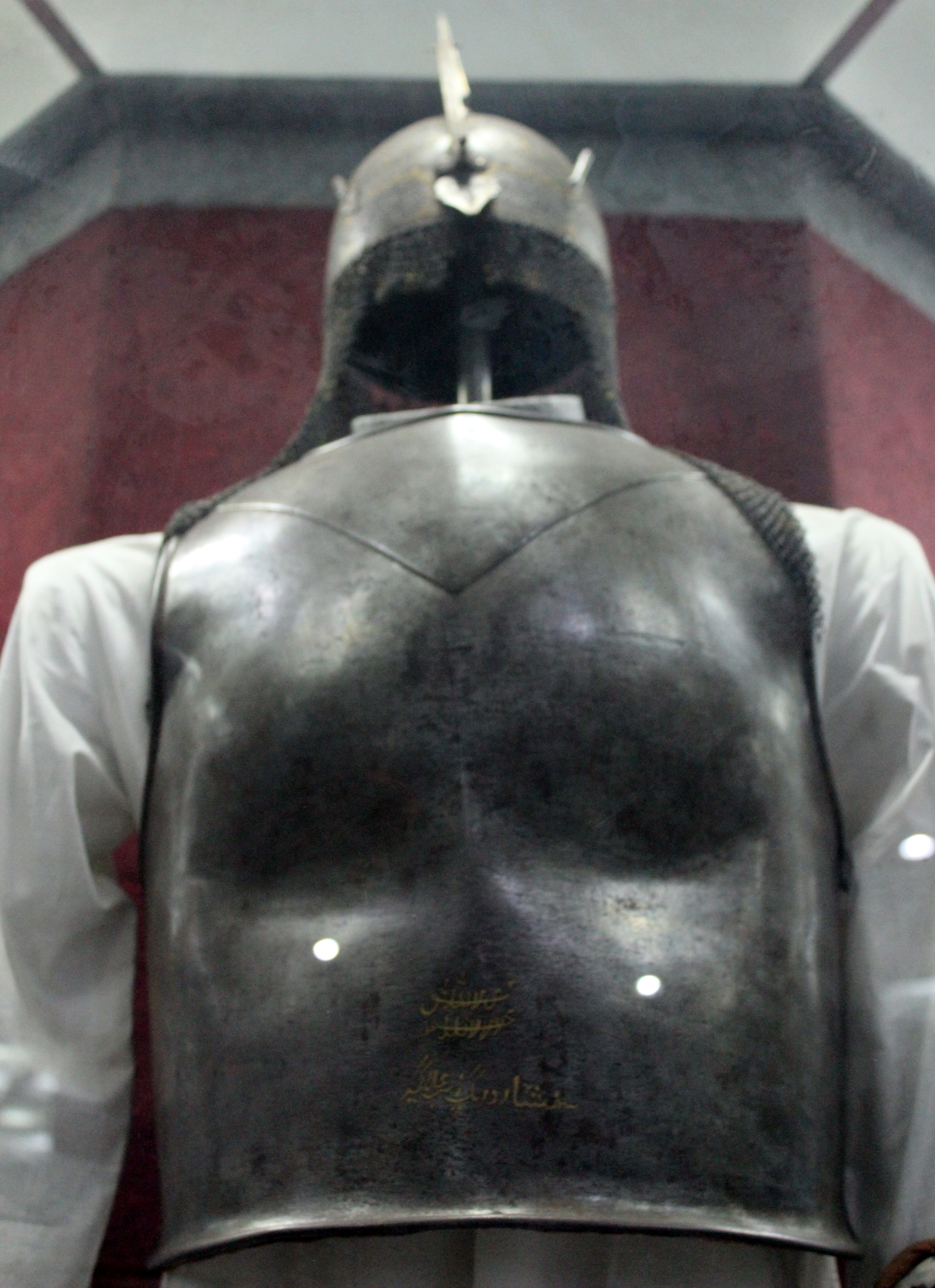
Body Armour of Aurangzeb

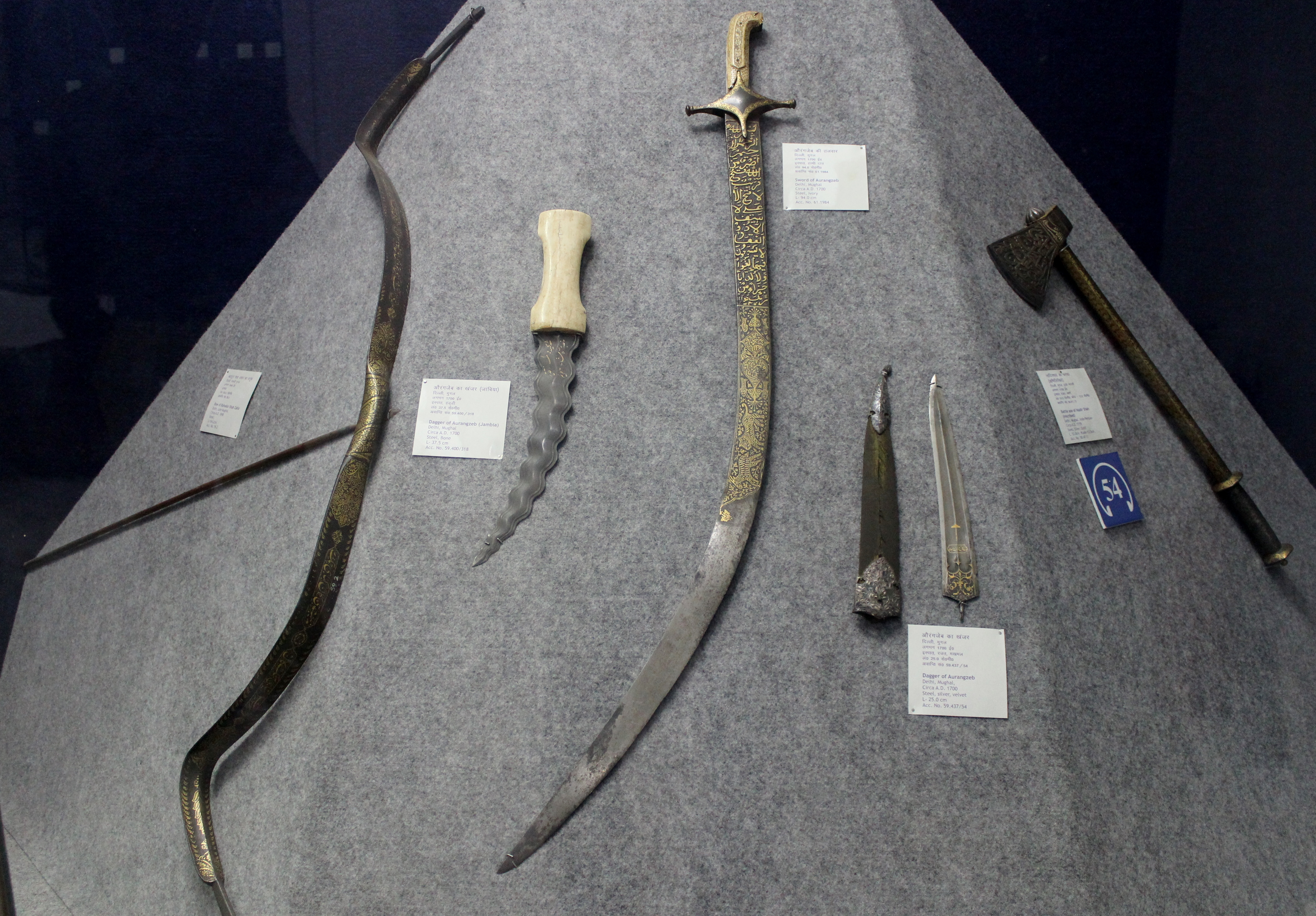
Bow & Arrow of Bahadur Shah Zafar II, Sword & Dagger of Aurangzeb and Battle Axe of Nadir Shah

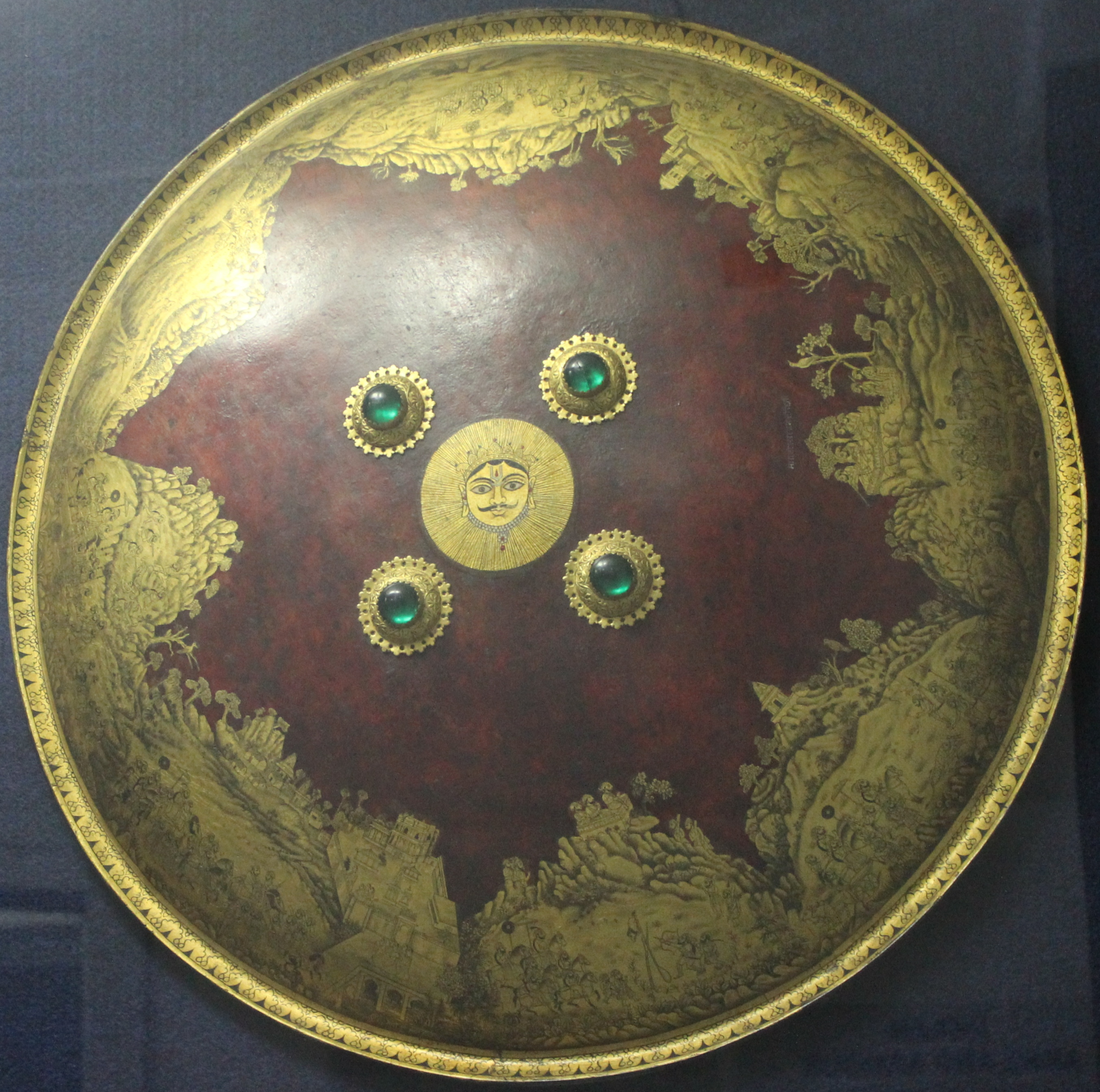
Shield of Maharana Sangram Singh II

== Tradition, art and continuity ==
A Gallery with over 200 objects ranging from a wide geographical and social spectrum, acquired from private collectors was added to the museum on 6 February 2014. Various objects on display are a palanquin from the Santhal community, scroll paintings from West Bengal, textiles such as Phulkaris from Punjab and bronze sculptures from Bastar, besides terracotta works and basketry. The gallery is a rich representation of art from various parts of India.

== Anubhav ==
The National Museum, in collaboration with UNESCO, National Platform for the Rights of the Disabled (NPRD) and Saksham, launched a new permanent gallery for Persons with Disabilities in the year 2015 which features tactile replicas of 22 objects from the collections of the museum as well as an audio guide, ramps and descriptive labels in Braille; the gallery encourages visitors to 'touch' and feel the objects on display. 'Anubhav: A Tactile Experience' ensures a conducive space and exposure to the objects for the disabled. The gallery was conceived and developed by Rige Shiba, Assistant Curator under the overall guidance of Vijay Kumar Mathir, Curator with assistance from Vasundhra Sangwan. The Replicas exhibited in the space have been made by the National Museum Modeling department headed by Hemant Tomar and his colleagues and the gallery has been designed by Amardeep Labana, with a special emphasis on dimensions. For instance, one can have a sensory experience of a mid-19th century coin from the Awadh region which has been recreated in 23-inch diameter and 2-inch thickness.

== Governance ==
On the basis of nature of grants and exercise of control, the National Museum comes within the purview of Central Government of India. It was initially looked after by the Director General of Archaeology until 1957, when the Ministry of Education, Government of India, declared it a separate institution and placed it under its own direct control, following this shift the museum began to significantly increase both its staff and its collections using funds from the Art Purchase Committee. At present, the National Museum is under the administrative control of the Ministry of Culture, Government of India.

== Donors ==
The first wave of collecting for the National Museum started in 1948 and which lasted around 1952, drawing heavily on scholars like V. S. Agarwala, Moti Chandra, Rai Krishnadas, Karl Khandalavala and their personal relationships with private collectors. Funding for mass collecting was granted by Parliament from 1947 but this first acquisition period is marked by lack of descriptive detail, quantifiable data, parameters surrounding the criteria of selection. O. C. Gangoly (1881–1974) sold a group from his collection of paintings to the National Museum in whose foundation he states he played a role. He further avers that he encouraged other fellow collectors to bequeath their collections to the National Museum but was not always successful. Collections of Burjor N. Treasurywalla (d. 1947) also resides in the National Museum, about which Gangoly says almost nothing except that it was large and important. He does emphasize how he was involved in the purchasing of the collection itself except that it was likely that Khandalavala, a relative of Treasurywallla, played a greater role. V. S. Agarwala was instrumental in securing extensive private collection of Ajit Ghose of Calcutta, Dickinson collection, Gulab Chand collection, Modi's collection and Medd's collection.

In recent years, according to a Standing Committee on Transport, Culture and Tourism query, the number of collections added to the National Museum was a total of 2269 objects during the period of 1994–2010. Out of this 1360 objects were purchased and remaining 906 objects were acquired through gifts etc. This small number was attributed to the Art Acquisition Committee of the National Museum being defunct since 1997.

== Auditorium ==
Beside the galleries, the museum also has an auditorium with a seating capacity of 250 people. A brief film introducing the museum and its collections is screened in the auditorium regularly. Film shows on art, history and heritage are also screened.

== Digitization of museum collections ==
The National Museum has started a special project to digitize its collection of objects in order to make it available for visitors to see online. This process involves digitization and storage of museum collections in a collection management system named ‘JATAN’. JATAN is a virtual museum builder software, that enables creation of digital collection management system for Indian museums and is deployed in several national museums across India. Its objective is to make a digital imprint of all the objects preserved in museums and help researchers, curators and other people interested in the field which has been designed and developed by Centre for Development of Smart Computing (C-DAC) Pune.

The digital imprints (of preserved objects and monuments) created using the JATAN software are integrated in the national digital repository and portal for making them accessible to the public. The National portal and digital repository for museums of India provides an integrated access to theme-based collections and artefacts (in terms of sculptures, paintings, manuscripts, weapons, coins and numerous other categories of artefacts) irrespective of the physical and geographical locations of museums. Centre for Development of Smart Computing has also developed "Darshak", a mobile-based application aimed at improving the museum visit experience among the disabled. It allows real-time museum visitors gather all details about objects or artefacts simply by scanning a QR code placed near the object.

=== National Museum collections on the Google Art Project ===
National Museum has volunteered objects from its collection on the Google Art Project which is a non-commercial initiative of Google through the Google Cultural Institute. More than hundred objects have been photographed and their descriptions are available on the Google Art Project website under the name of National Museum, New Delhi, which has given a high reach to online visitors for the collection. The Google page of National Museum will be populated further by adding other pertinent collections from National Museum on it.

== Controversy ==
In 2010, in the first study of its kind, UNESCO presented a report which rated the National Museum along with other seven museums, as badly maintained, poorly lit and having incorrect signs. In a response by the then Minister of Social Justice and Empowerment and Tourism, Selja Kumari in a written reply to Parliament said that the ratings and findings of the report were invalid since the no. of surveyors was inadequate.

== Future ==
Although in its early stages, another project for which the site proposed for redevelopment constitutes the most iconic part of India's capital city, Central Vista Redevelopment Project, the National Museum is one of the buildings listed in the tender as some of these buildings approaching the end of their "structural lives" while those that are around a 100 years old, like North and South Blocks, are not "earthquake safe".

== Exhibition: The Indo-Siam Connect ==
An exhibition titled "Indo-Siam Connect: Tracing The Indian Heritage in Thai Art and Living Traditions", was organised by the Museum, in association with the Royal Thai Embassy, at the erstwhile Buddhist Gallery of the Museum, from 28 February to 31 May. It was organised to celebrate the 75th Anniversary of Diplomatic Relations between India and Thailand. The exhibition, presented transcultural notions reflected by the Indo-Siam connections as seen in the multifaceted aspects of religion, texts, visual art, architecture, textiles and performances, highlighted how both the countries share a glorious longstanding historical, cultural, and religious milieu since ancient times, which continue to flourish till the present day.

This exhibition presented thematic variations by showcasing the chronological progression, and the diverse visual elements, which show the continuing and dynamic cultural and artistic relationships shared by the two countries. The connection between the two nations was traced through the idea of navigation, orientation and mobility of people, goods, and belief patterns, which facilitated in the processes of cultural transmission and localization of icons, texts and artistic activities. Consequently, it led to the formation of sanctified cities as a representation of powerful statecraft and kingship. These were based on the concepts of the unified cosmological symbolism, divine patronage and spiritualism, marked by the creation of prominent architectural edifices, including temples and stupas. This proliferation of cultural exchanges, evident in the quest for spiritual awakening and learning, led to the dissemination of symbols, rituals, yogic practices oral traditions and belief systems. This visual journey highlighted all these various strands through the wealth of the different varieties of exhibits on display.

A special focus was on the Tai ethnic groups residing in Northeast India, who are also scattered through much of mainland Southeast Asia and parts of China, as their lifestyles and traditions help in tracing the contemporary dynamic paths of cultural exchanges in the modern times. Among the various ethnic groups inhabiting the expansive region of Assam, and Arunachal Pradesh, particularly, the Tai Ahom, Tai Phai, Tai Aiton, and the Tai Khampti tribes played a seminal role in the spread of Buddhism in Thailand via Burma and they show similarities in cultural and material life with the indigenous communities of Thailand. The exhibition also had a section devoted to the concept of celebration of life as seen in the oral and visual performances of these indigenous groups.

The theme was primarily visualized through the artifacts from the National Museum collection. There were pottery stone sculptures, bronzes, wood carvings, terracotta, paintings, textiles and ethnic objects. These masterpieces range from collections of Anthropology, Archaeology, Decorative Art, and Pre-Columbian to Western Art. Additionally, to enhance the comparative artistic tradition of Thailand, select replicas of the masterpieces of ancient Thai art masks, musical instruments, photographs of Thai archaeological sites and objects, etc., contributed by the Royal Thai Embassy, were also on display. A wide range of silk-textiles from Assam and Thailand, from the collection of Dr, Pawan Jain, Art Historian and Smt, Gunjan Jain, Textile Designer, were also exhibited. The Swargadeo Chaolung Siukapha Samanway Kshetra, Mohbandha, Jorhat, Assam, also contributed a rare collection of Tal-Ahom manuscripts. Photographs from the field documentation conducted by the curatorial team of the Museum in Arunachal Pradesh and Assam, which were on display, highlighted the similarities in Buddhist architectural edifices.

There were almost a hundred and fifty objects on display that emphasized on aspects of the shared heritage and artistic linkages of Indo-Thai spheres from ancient to modern times. The exhibition located the fundamental and prominent role India has played throughout the waves of cultural dissemination, and the displayed objects collectively brought forth a historical narrative that has been part of an India consciousness for centuries.

== See also ==
- Carved wood vahanas in National Museum
- Gyan chauper
- Ivory Carved Dashavtar
- Ivory carved tusk depicting Buddha life stories
- Jade Collection in National Museum
