= Ivory carved tusk depicting Buddha life stories =

Ivory carved Buddha statue in India

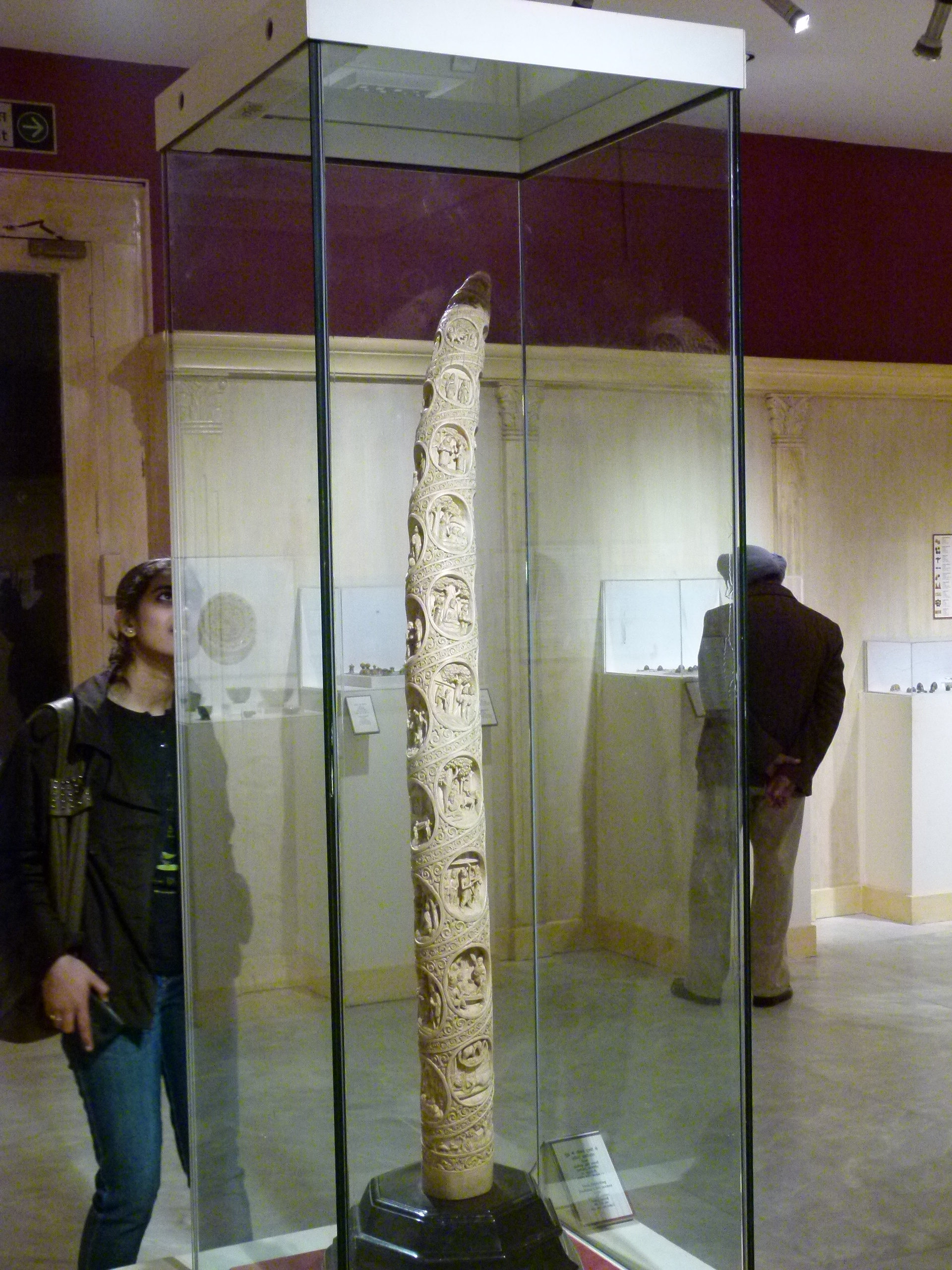
20th century carved ivory tusk at Decorative Arts Gallery, National Museum, New Delhi

Carved elephant tusk depicting Buddha life stories is an intricately carved complete single tusk now exhibited at the Decorative Arts gallery, National Museum, New Delhi, India. This tusk was donated to the Museum. This tusk, which is nearly five foot long, illustrates forty three events in the life of the Buddha and is thought to have been made by early 20th century craftsmen from the Delhi region.

== Description ==
The use of the complete ivory tusks for carving was popular in 18th and 19th century India, particularly in the Delhi region apart from Burma. Similar whole tusk carvings are also found in the Ivory Coast, Congo and Benin but made from the tusks of African elephants.

The art of ivory carving in India is very ancient with references found in Kalidasa's Meghadūta. The earliest ivory carving from the Indian region is comb dating to the 2nd century CE found at Taxila. Ivory carving flourished in Assam and Mysore where elephants were available and the art of ivory carving had royal patronage. Ivory was an object of trade between kingdoms and they found their way into areas where the art of carving had patronage.

This ivory tusk illustrates important life events of Buddha in 43 circular roundel, first 25 referring to the story of Buddha's birth to his enlightenment followed by 18 depicting his life events from enlightenment to Mahaparinirvana. Similar scenes have been presented in sculptures and paintings many a times but this ivory tusk shows few new scenes of Buddha's life such as Siddharatha's fight for a bird, his move against animal sacrifice and realization of death. As the thickness of the tusk reduces upwards, one can see at the tip three well-known postures depicting Bhumisparsha mudra, Abhayamudra and Dharmachakrapravatan mudra besides the roundels. There is also an intricately carved floral creeper banding around the roundels enhancing its beauty.

== Scenes ==
The story runs from bottom to top and is arranged clockwise.

=== Pre Enlightenment Life Events of Buddha ===
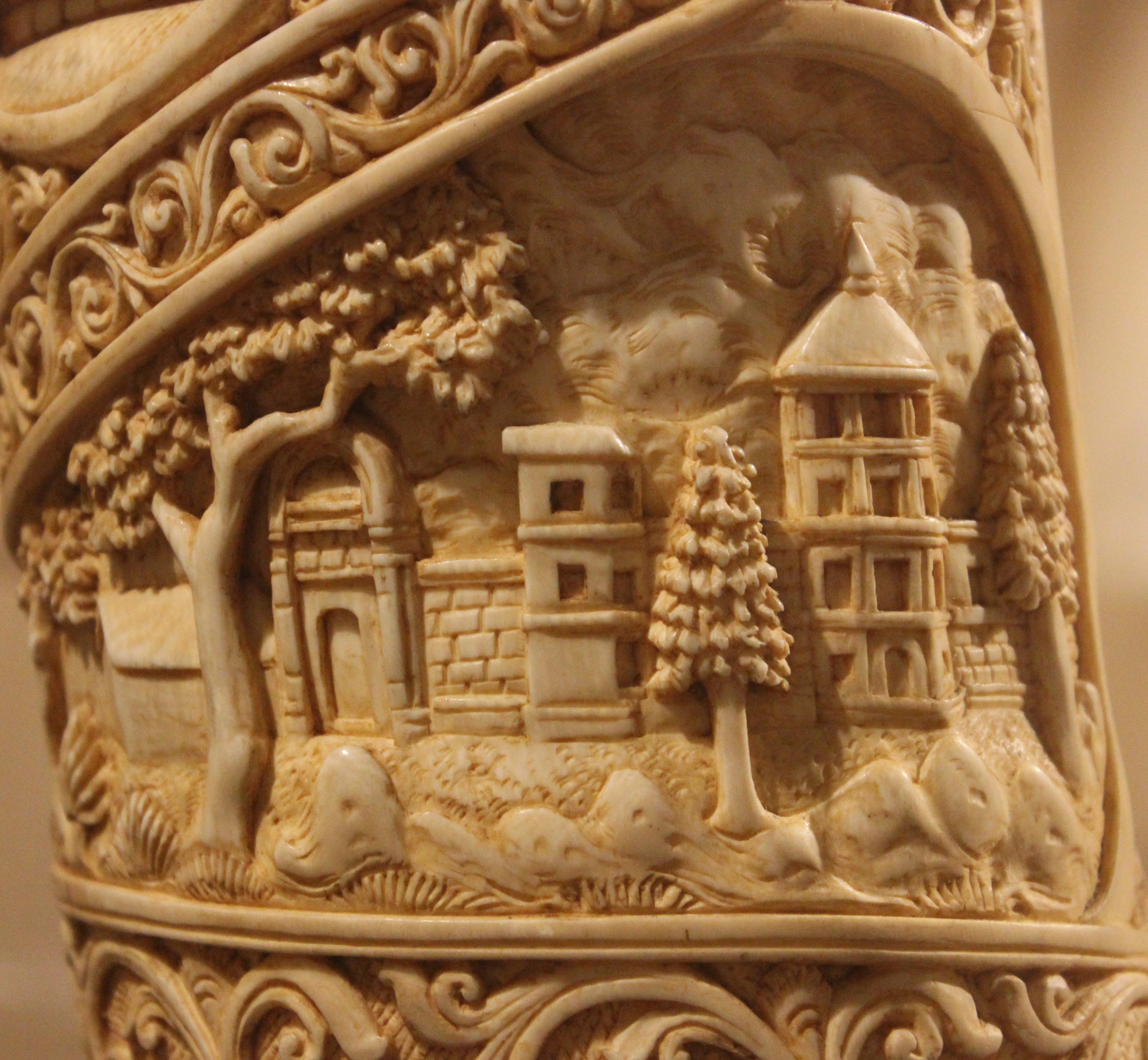
Depiction of Kapilavastu, where prince Siddharatha lived The first roundel shows mountains, flora-fauna and architecture which gives the impression of a town probably Kapilavastu.

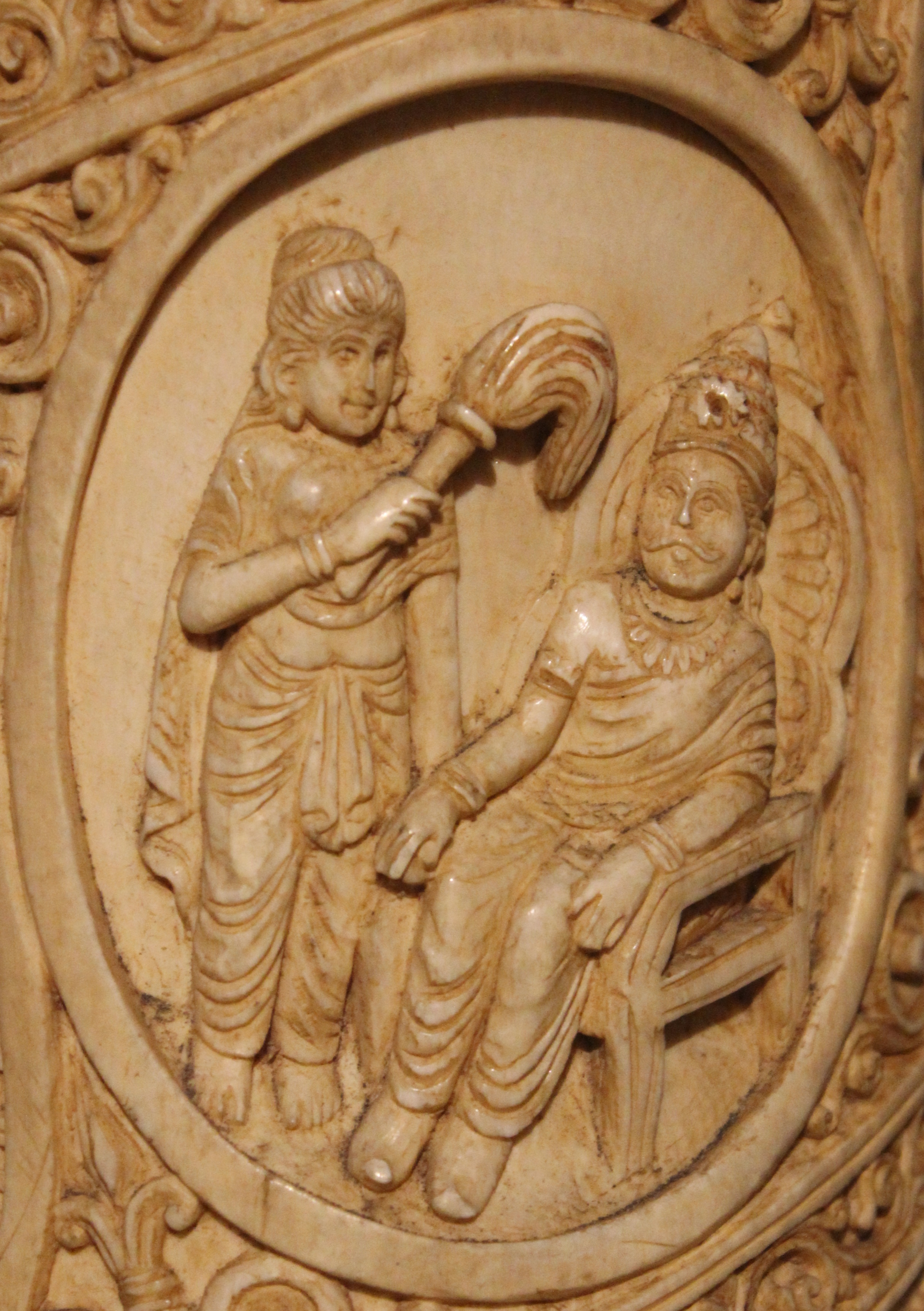
Seated figure of King Suddhodana The father of Siddhartha, King Suddhodana of Kapilavastu has been shown seated on his throne.

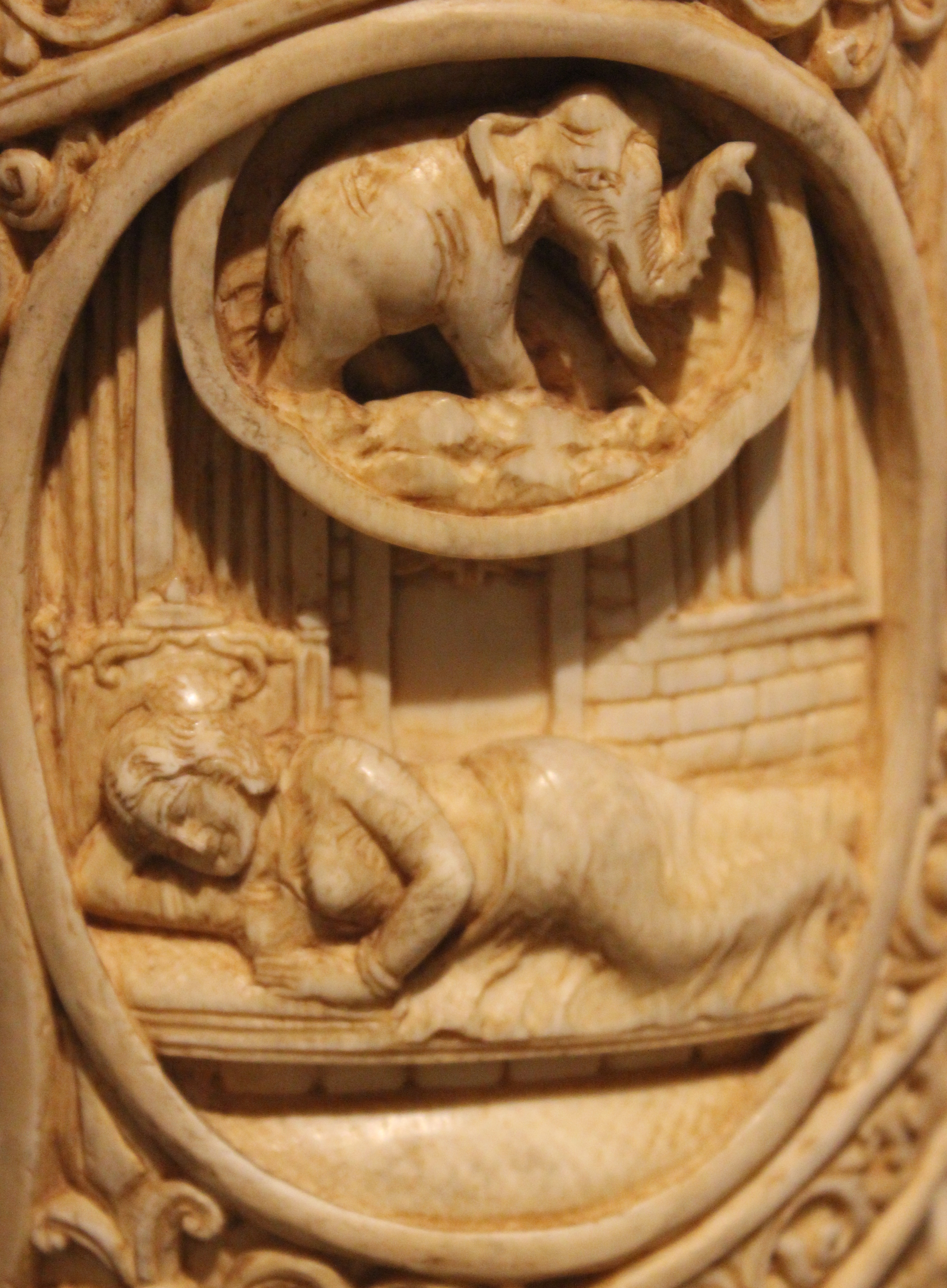
Dream of Queen Mayadevi The mother of Siddhartha, Queen Mayadevi is having a dream of an elephant which symbolizes the saintly soul's appearance in her womb.

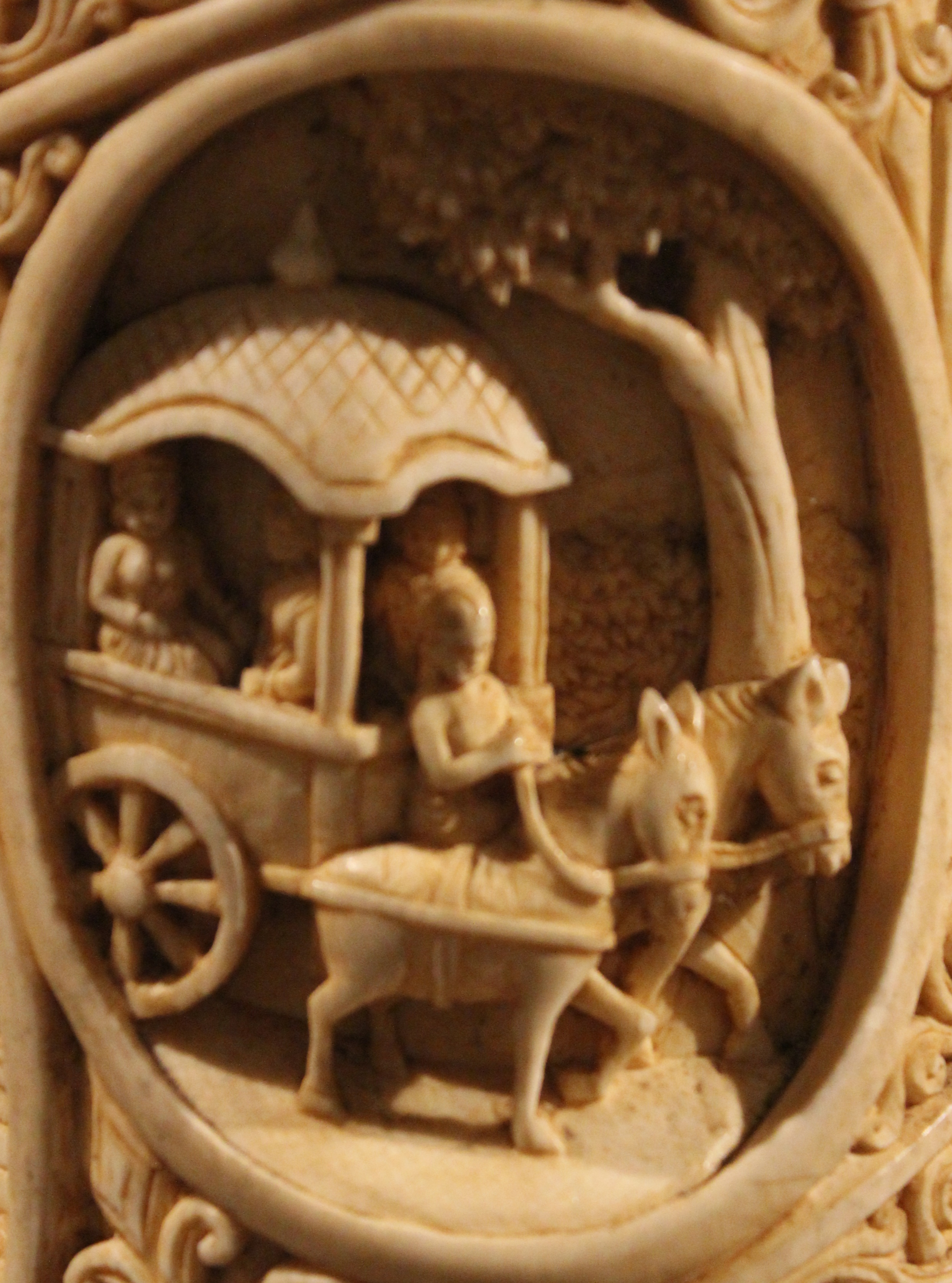
Mayadevi visiting her parents

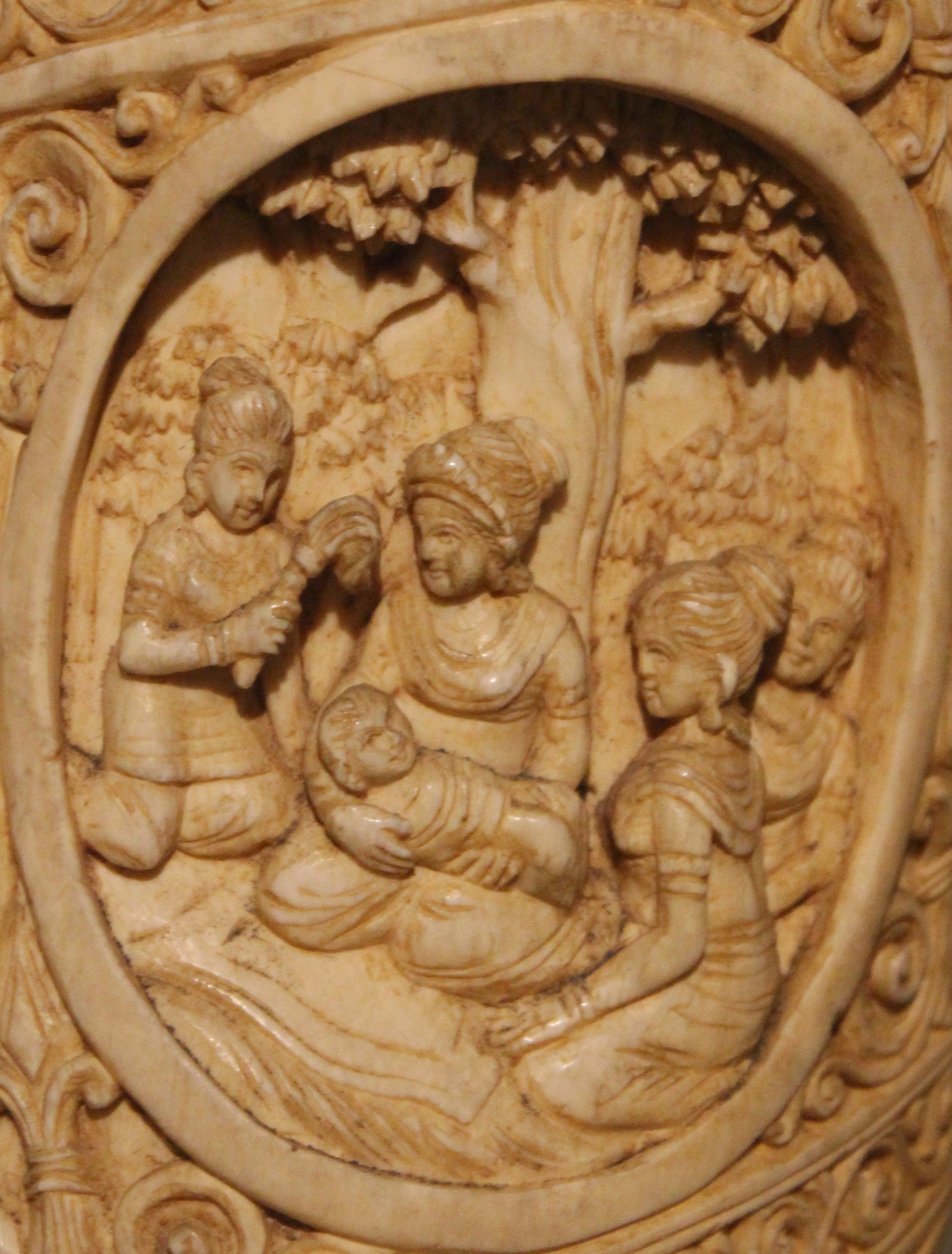
Mayadevi with her son Siddharatha This scene depicts the birth of Siddhartha, Prince of Kapilavastu in a different manner from other literary and sculptural narrations. Here Queen Mayadevi is shown seated with a baby in her lap surrounded by cauri-bearer and friends.

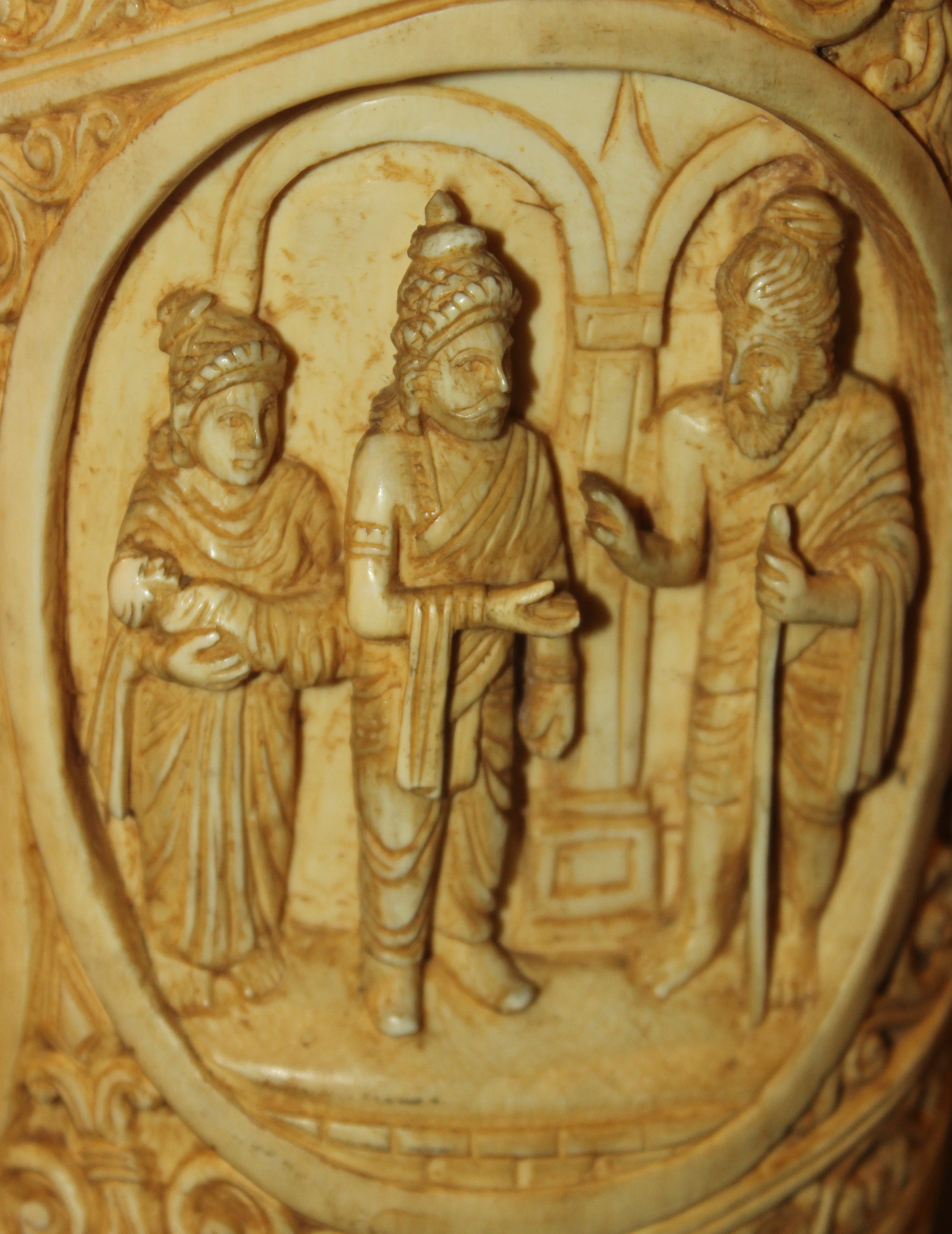
Sage Asita visiting King Suddhodana

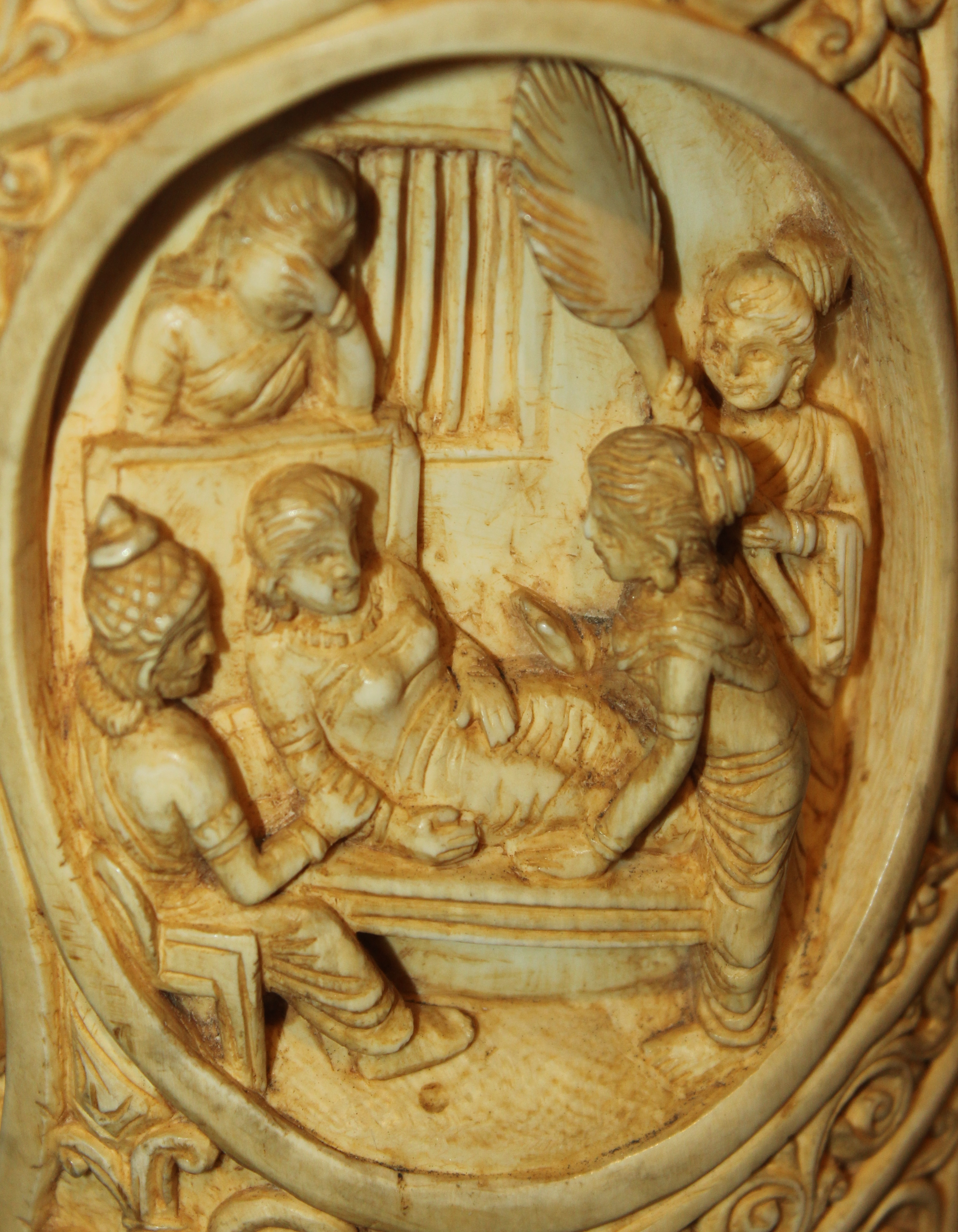
Mayadevi's death scene

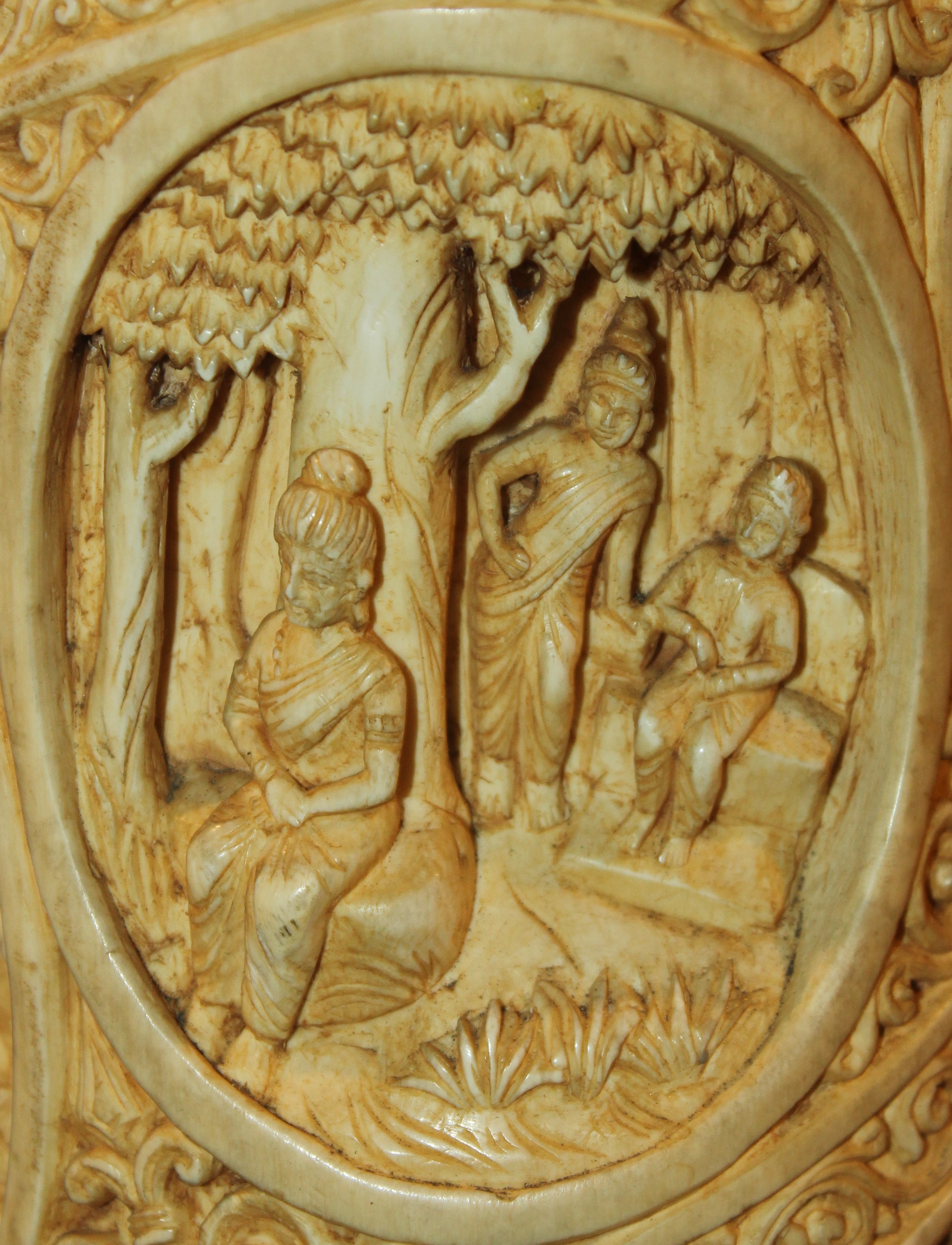
Prince Siddhartha in a garden

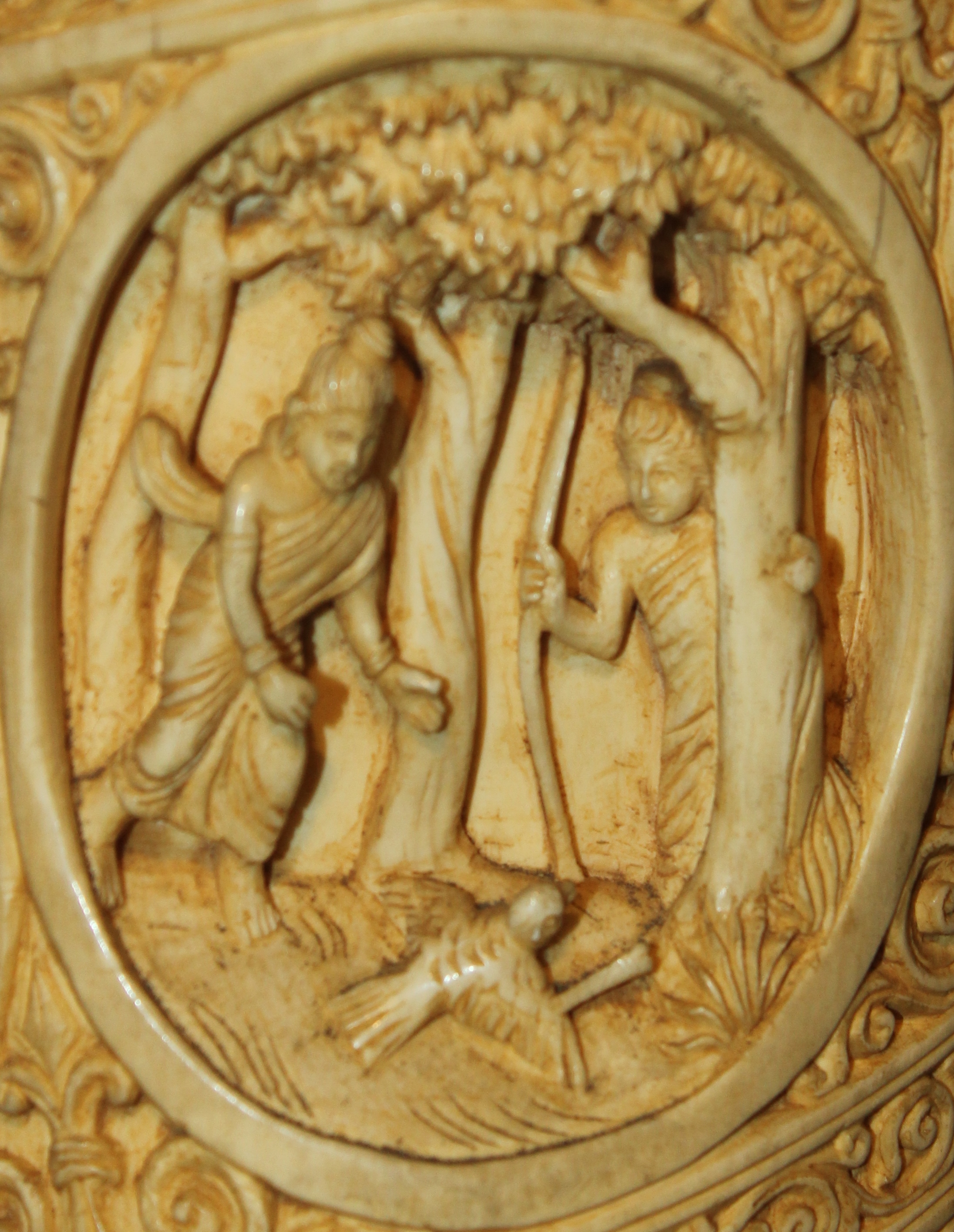
Siddhartha and Devadutta with a wounded bird

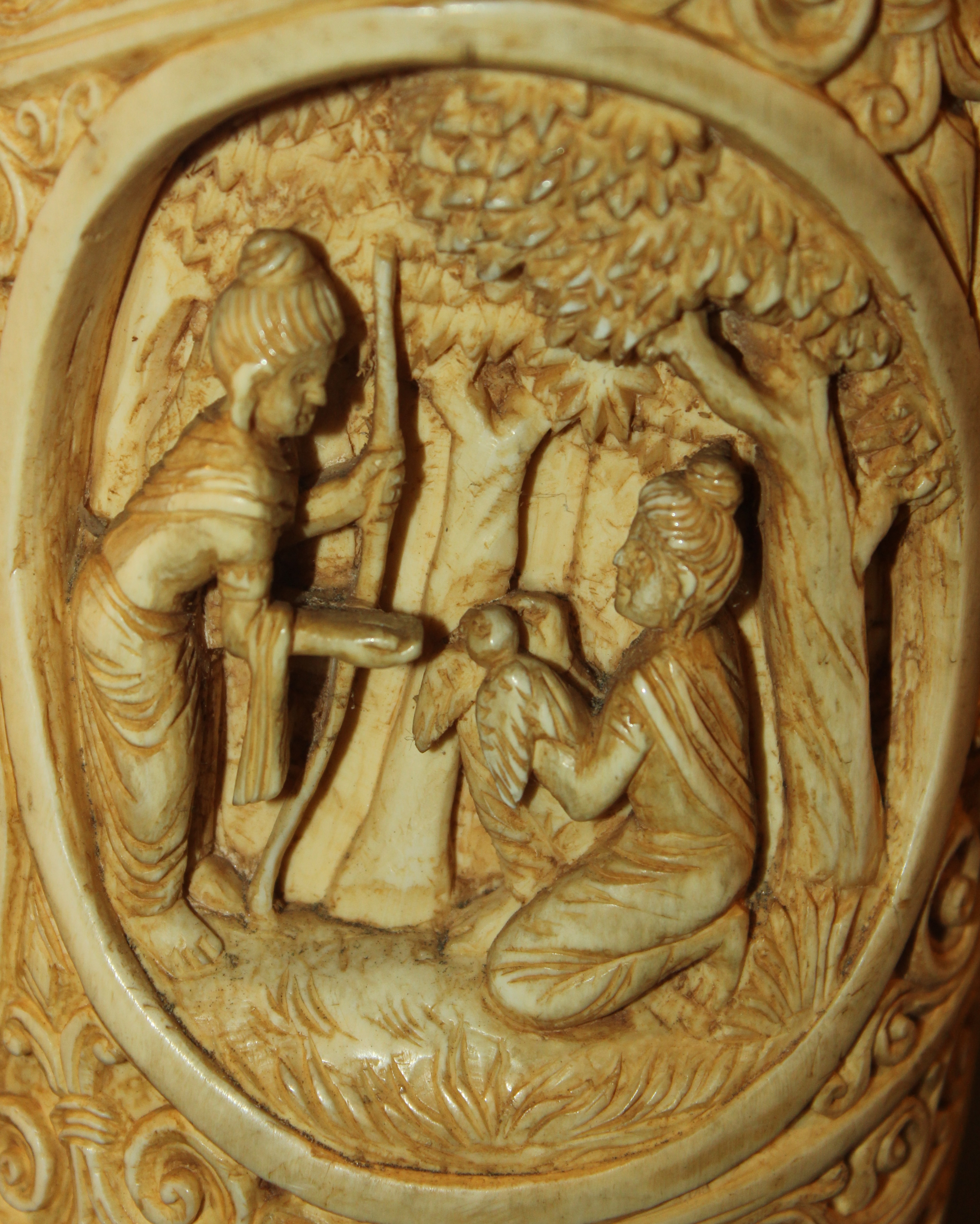
Siddhartha tends and cures the bird

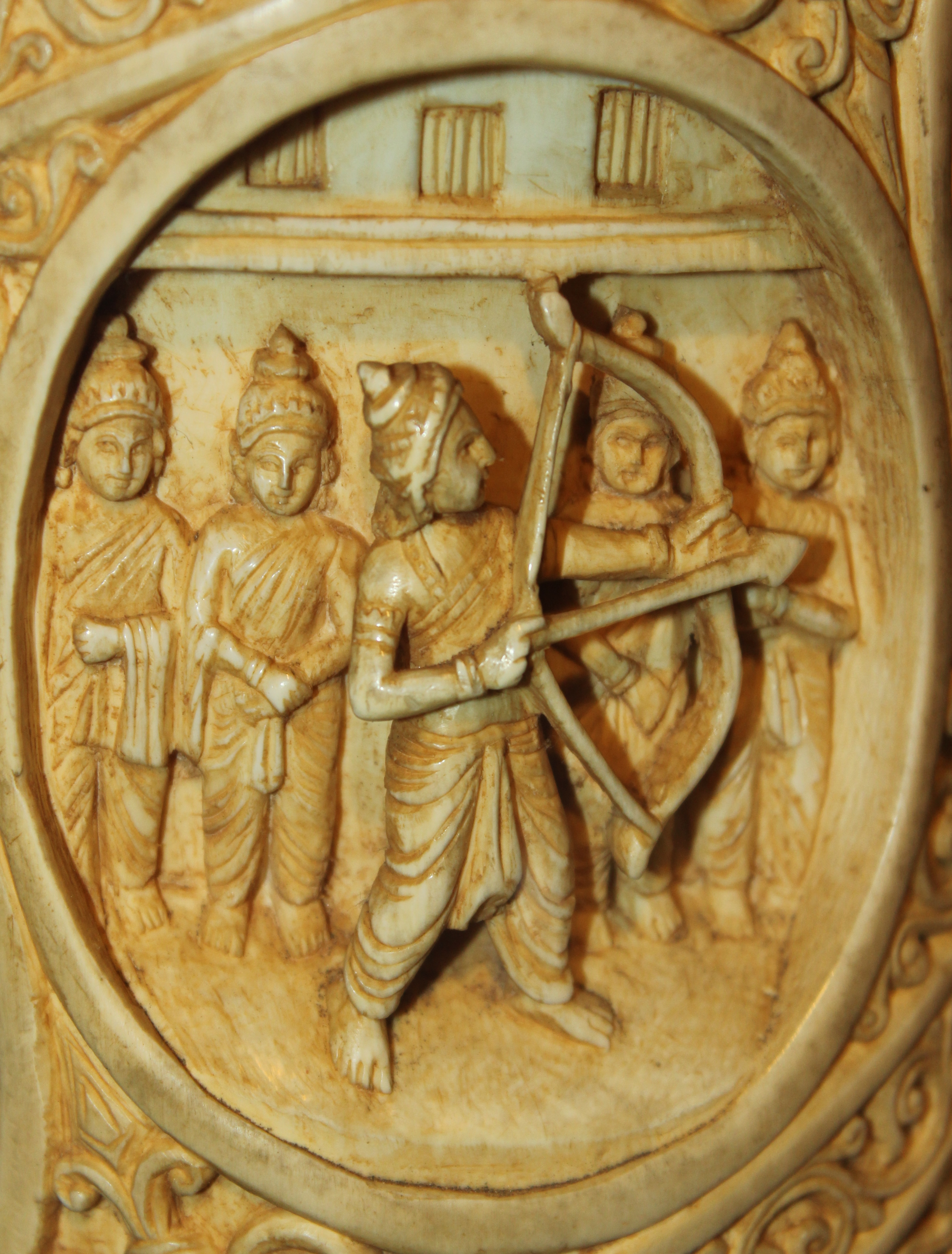
Siddhartha as an archer in the Swamvara of Princess Yasodhara

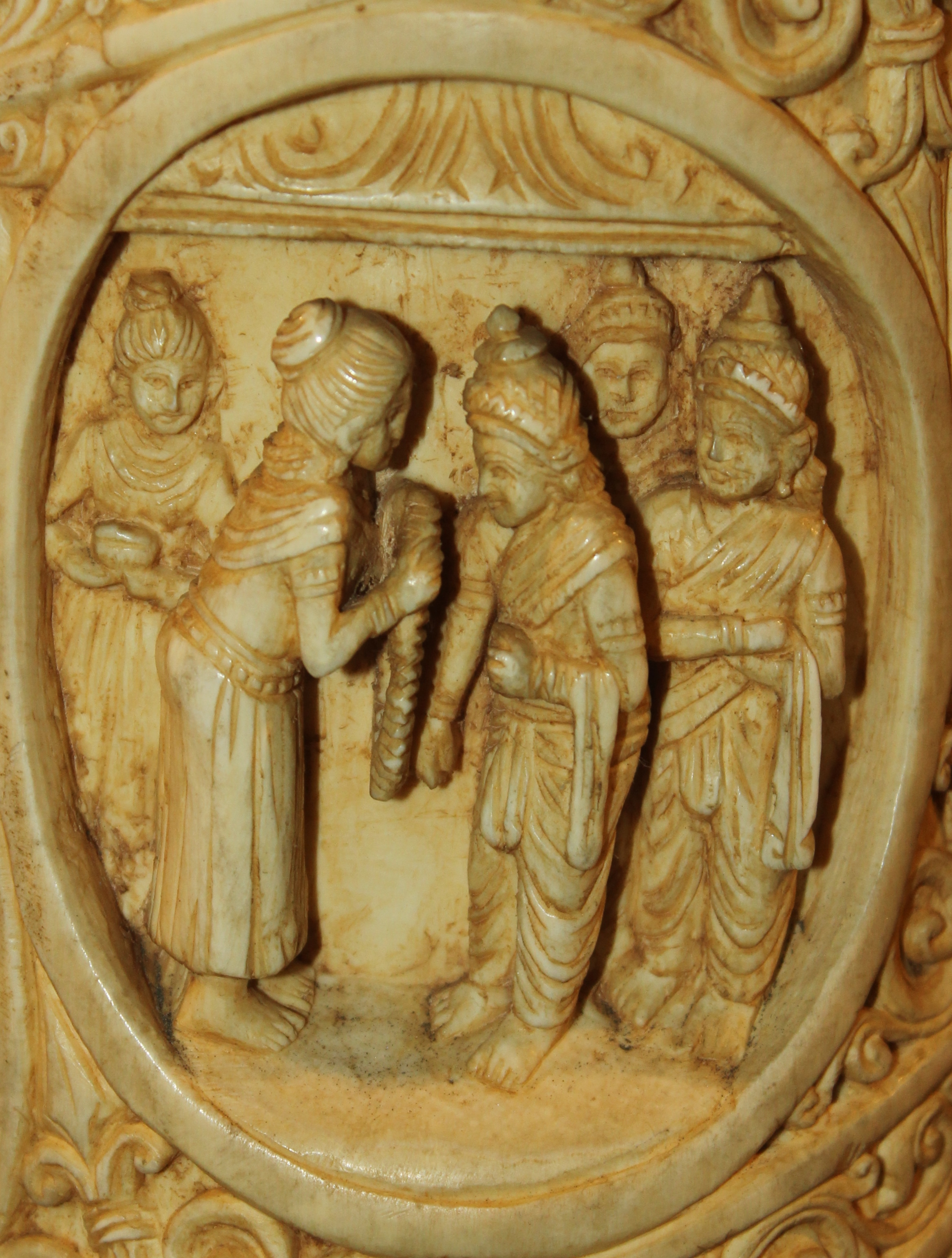
Yasodhara garlanding Siddhartha

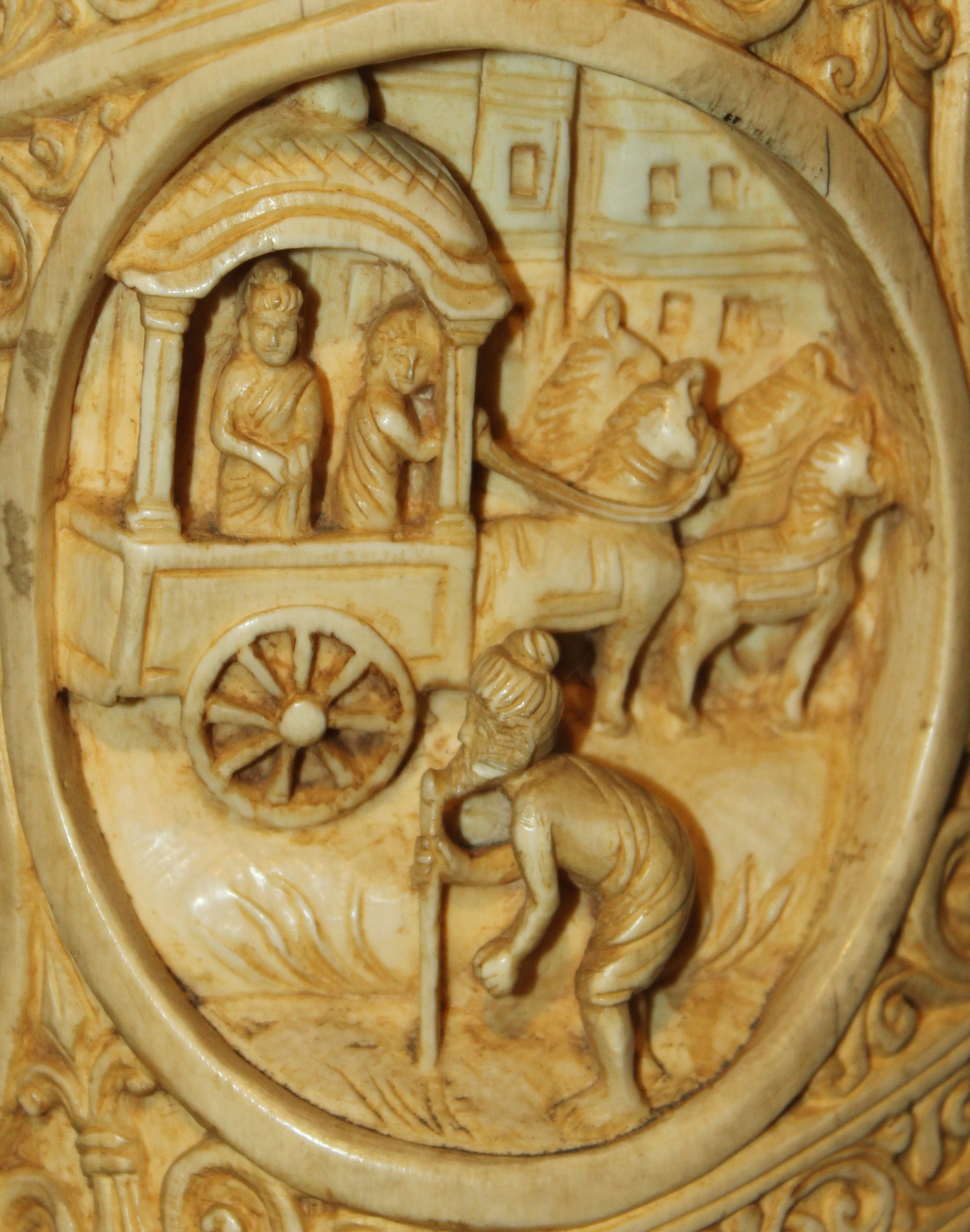
Siddhartha meets an old man

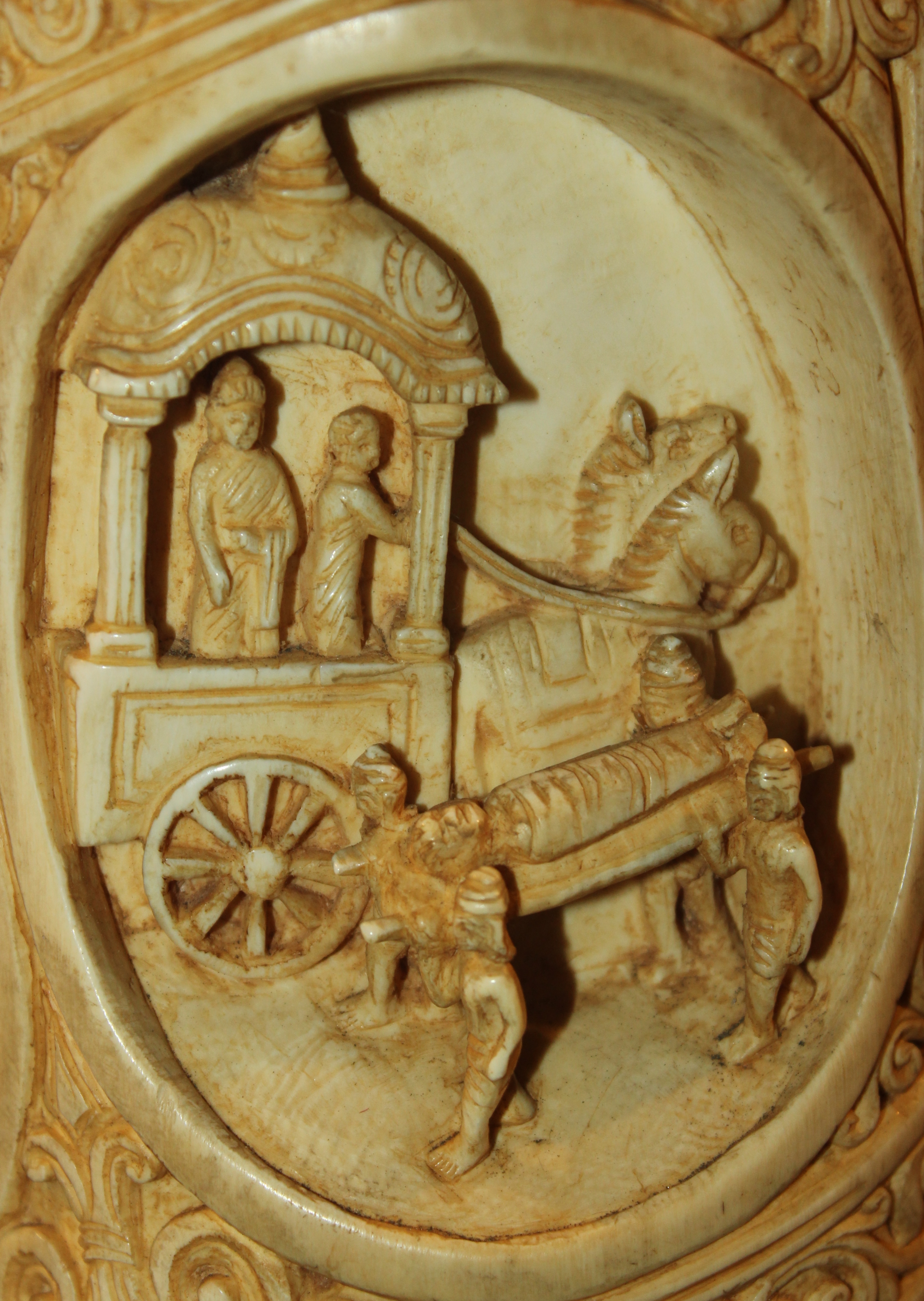
Siddhartha sees a corpse

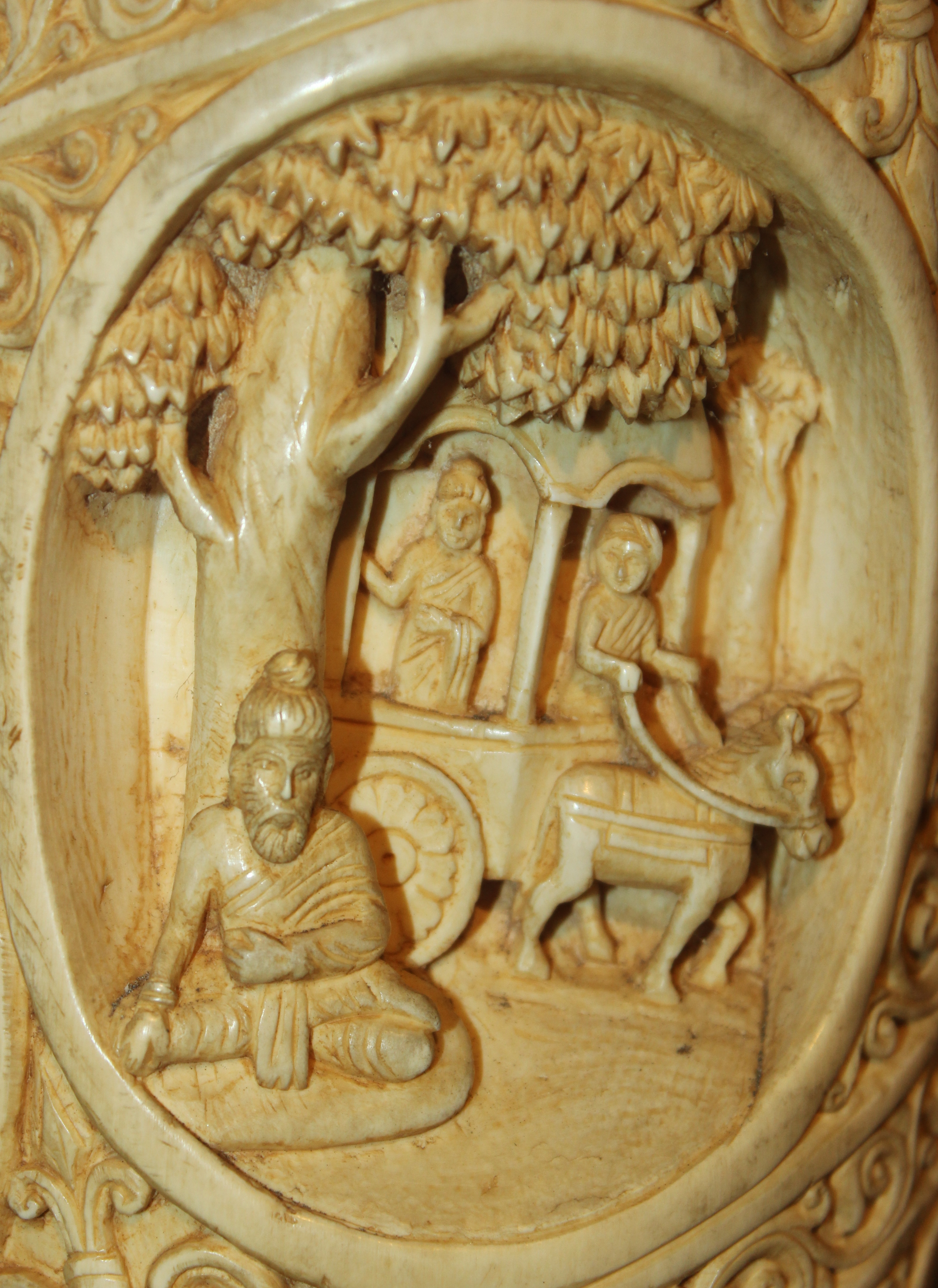
Siddhartha sees a meditating ascetic

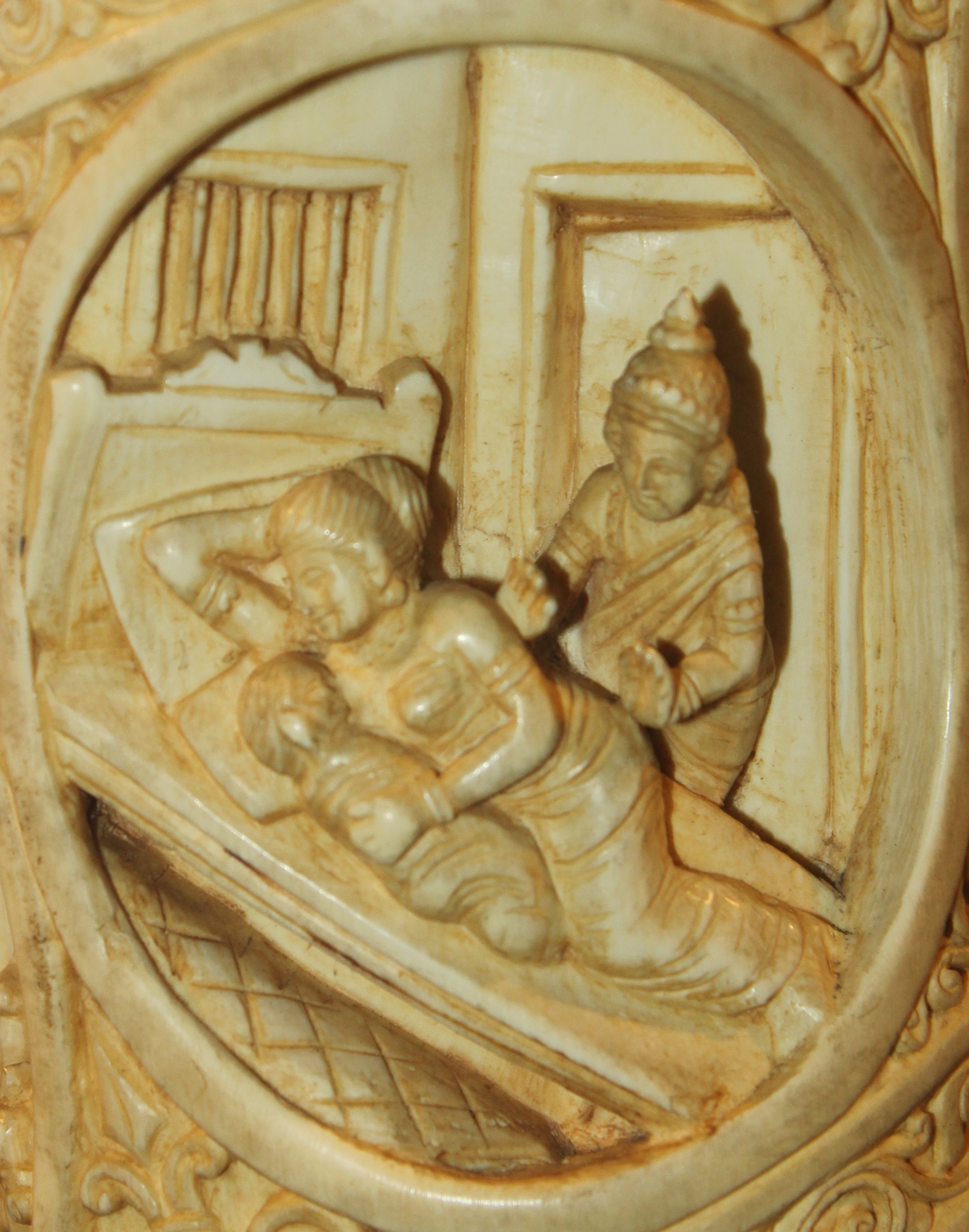
Siddhartha leaves his sleeping wife and sons

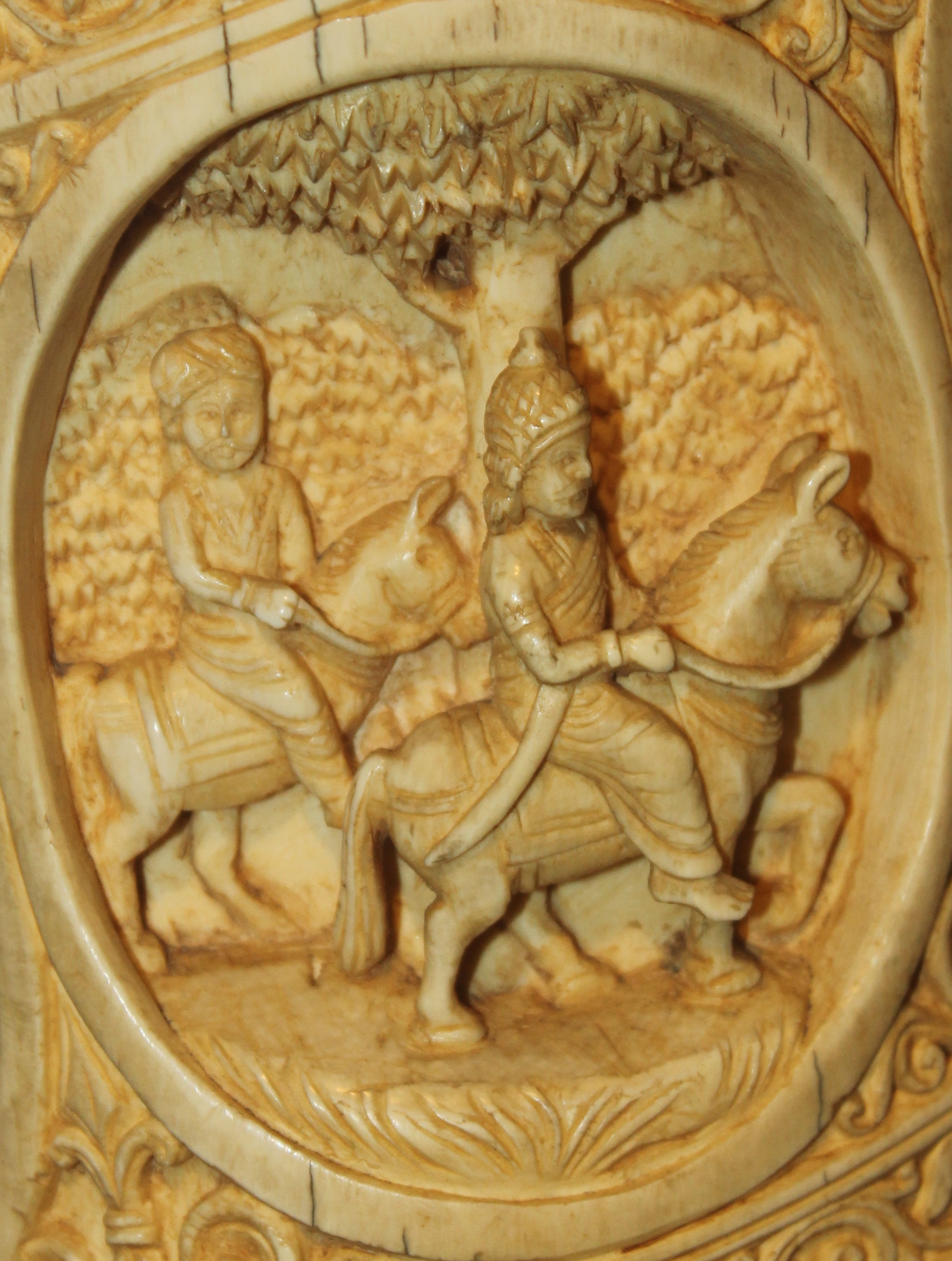
Siddhartha with his assistant Chandaka leaving the Palace

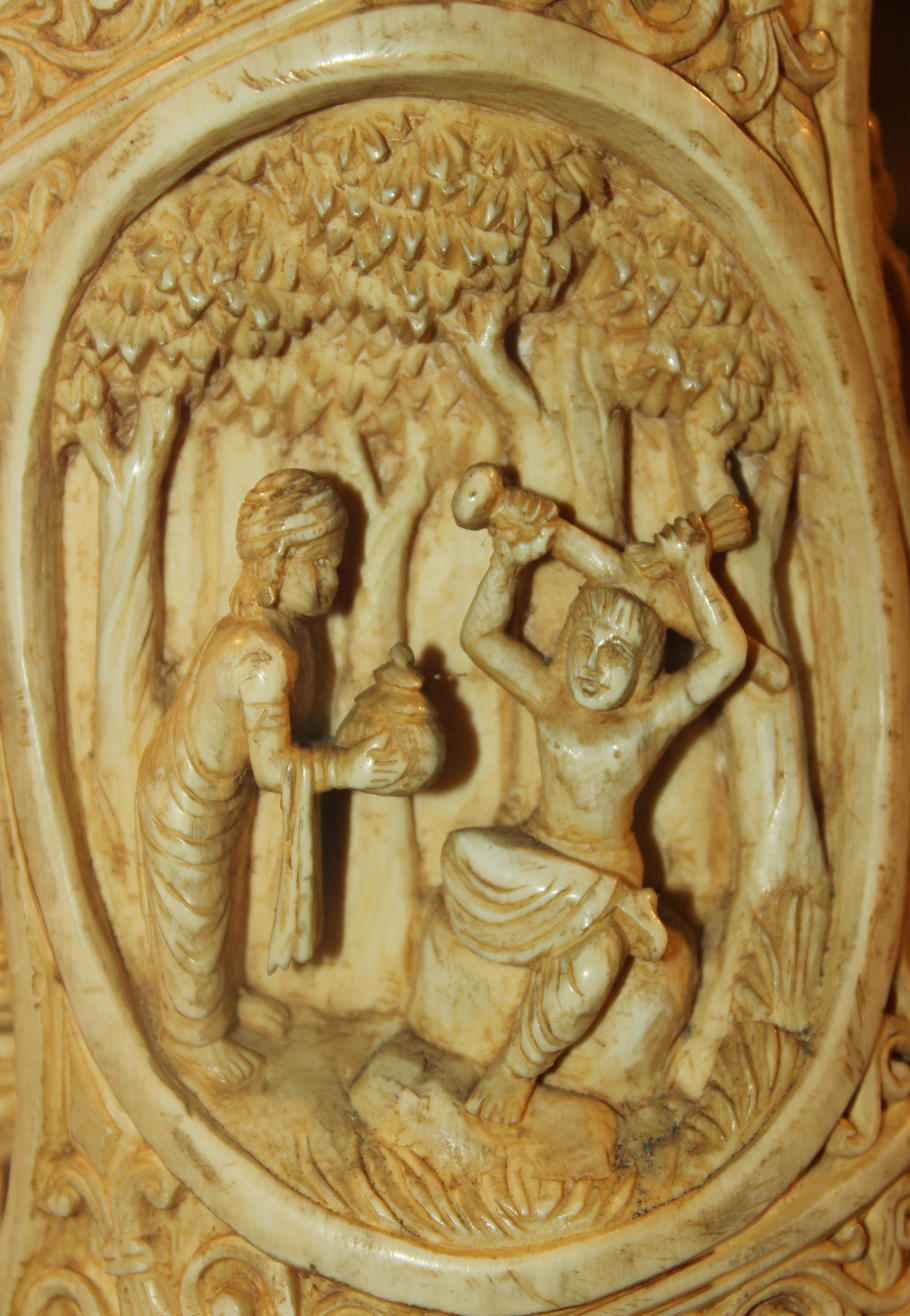
Siddhartha cuts his hair and removes his jewellery and royal costume

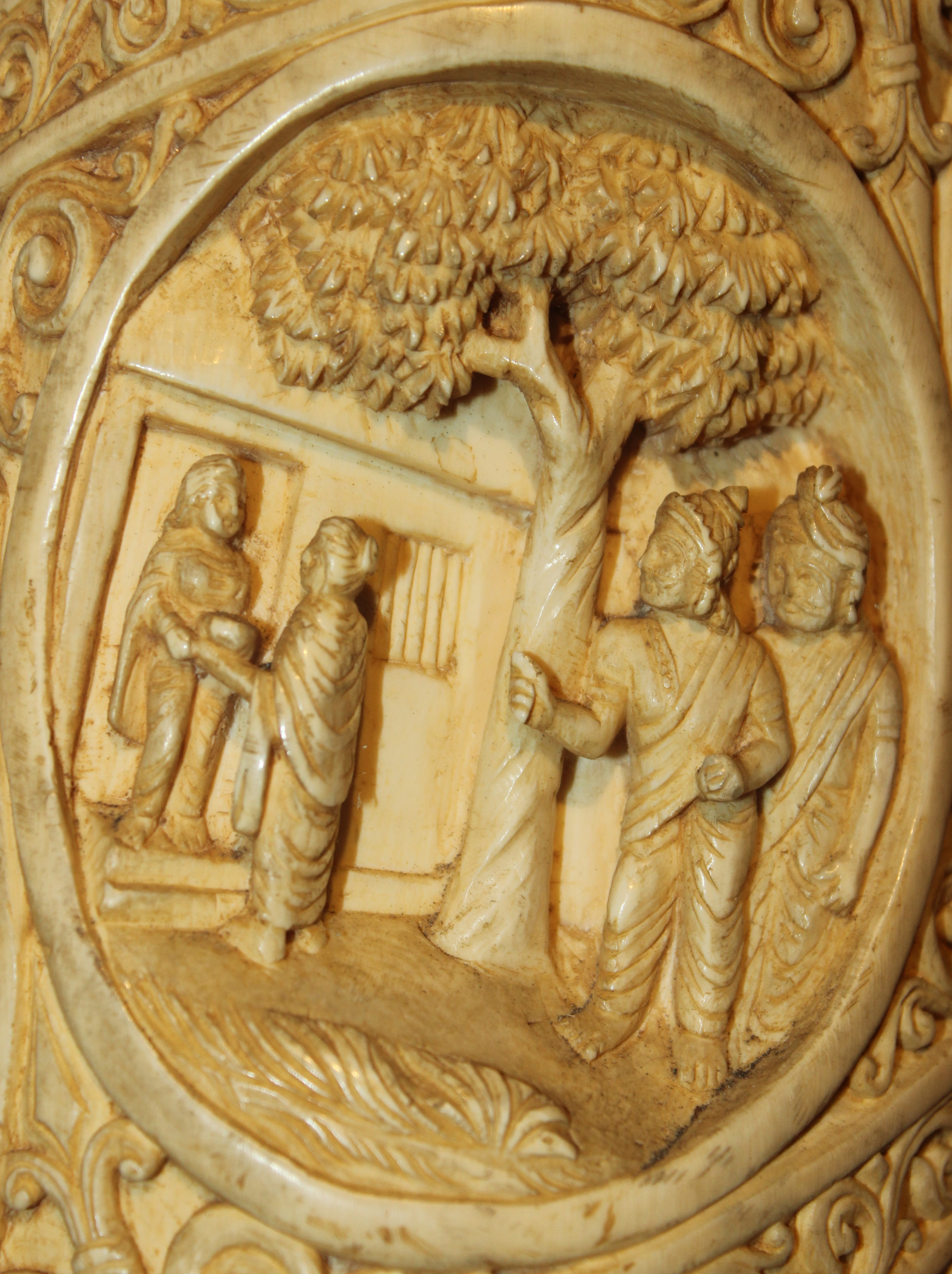
Siddhartha receives bhiksha from a woman

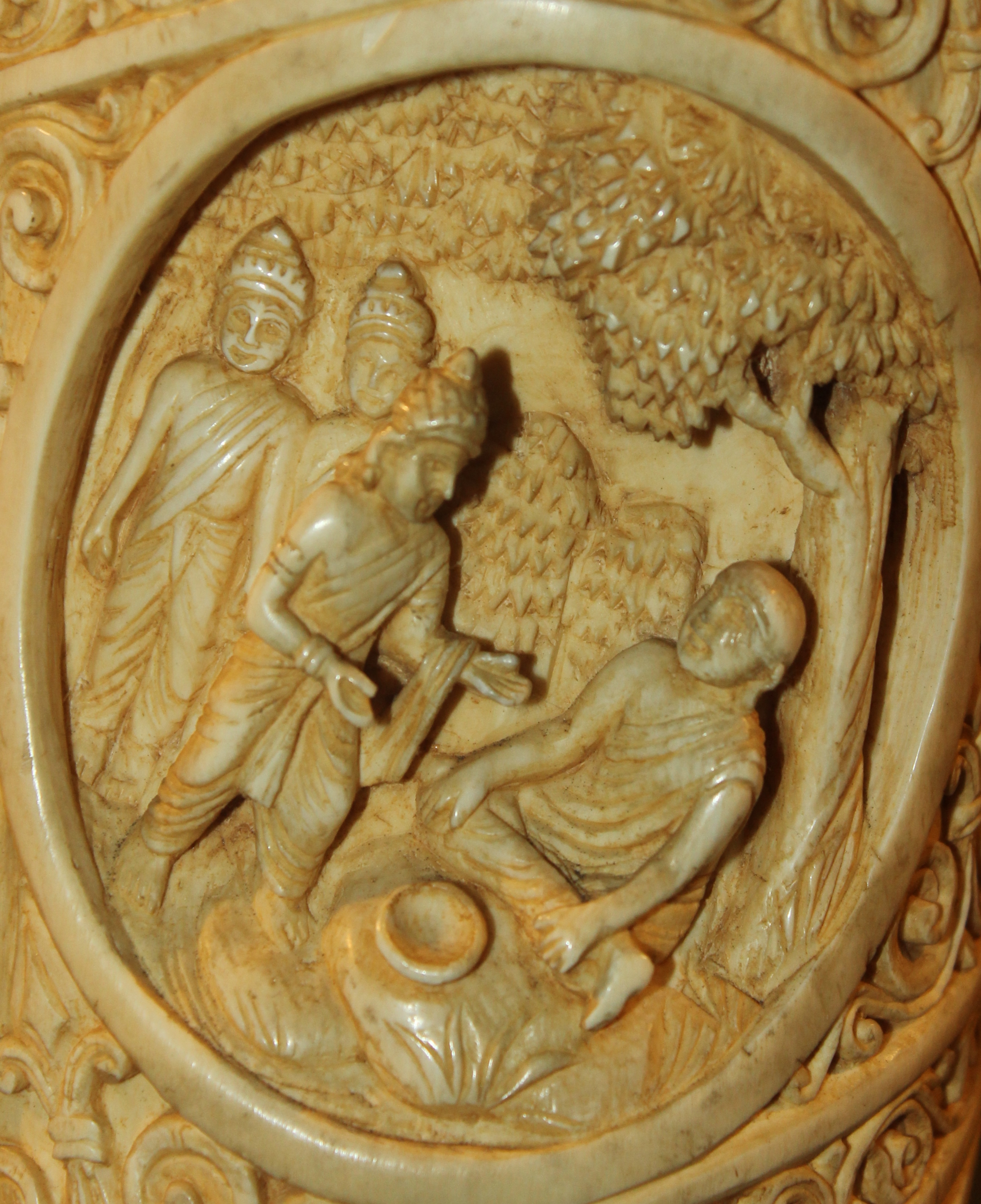
Siddhartha in Meditation

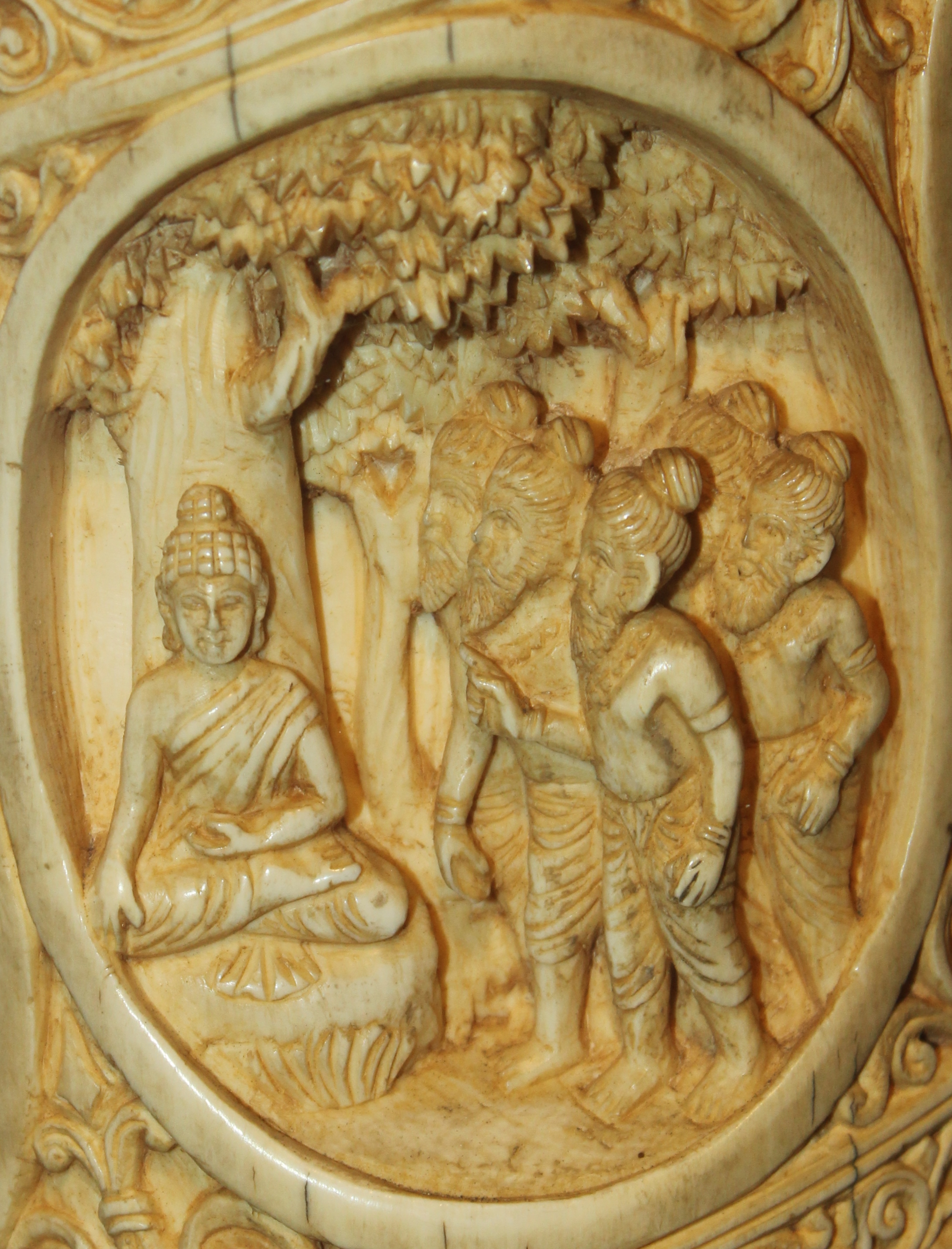
Five saintly persons visit Siddhartha while he meditates

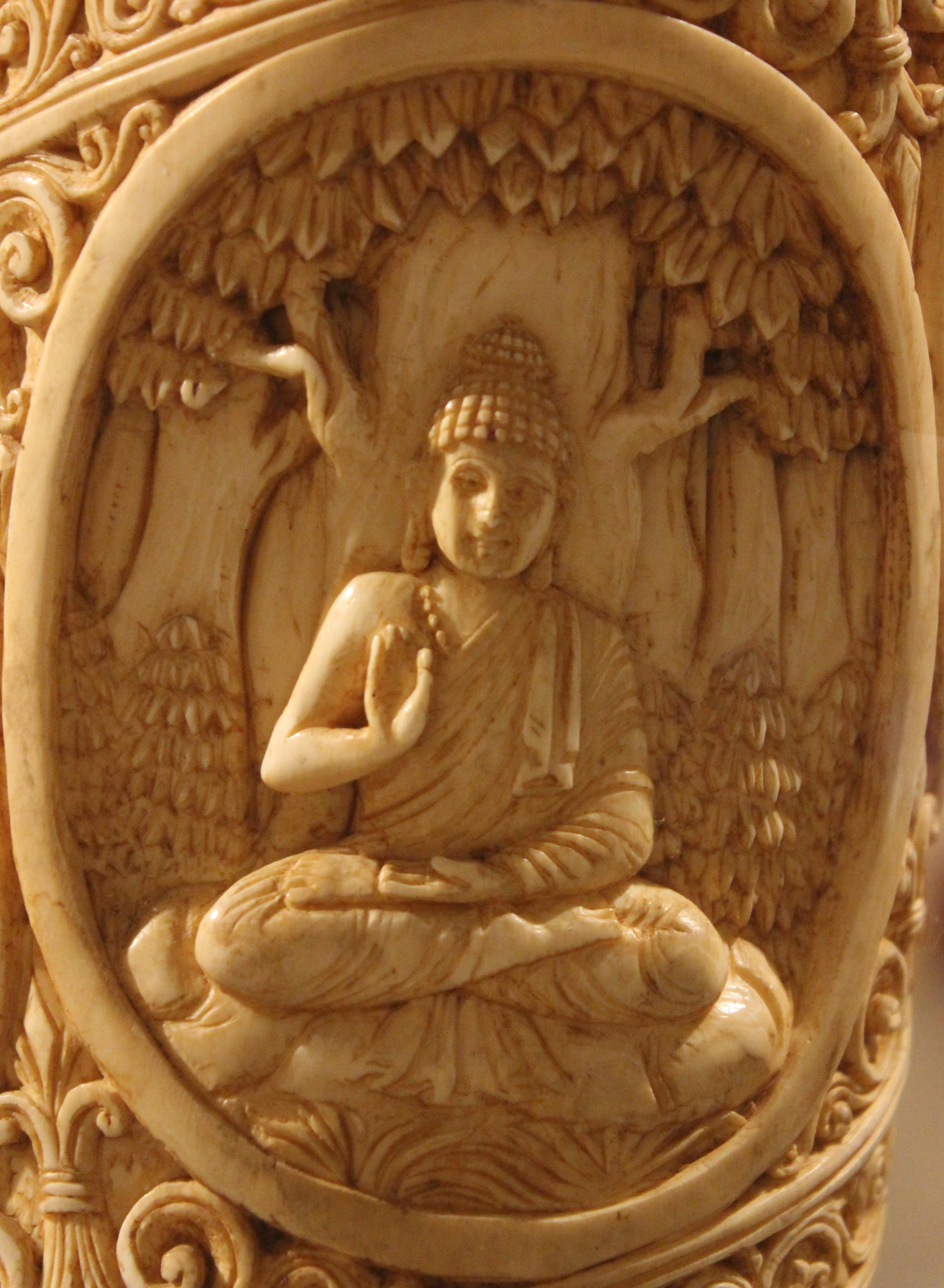
Buddha seated under a tree in Abhayamudra

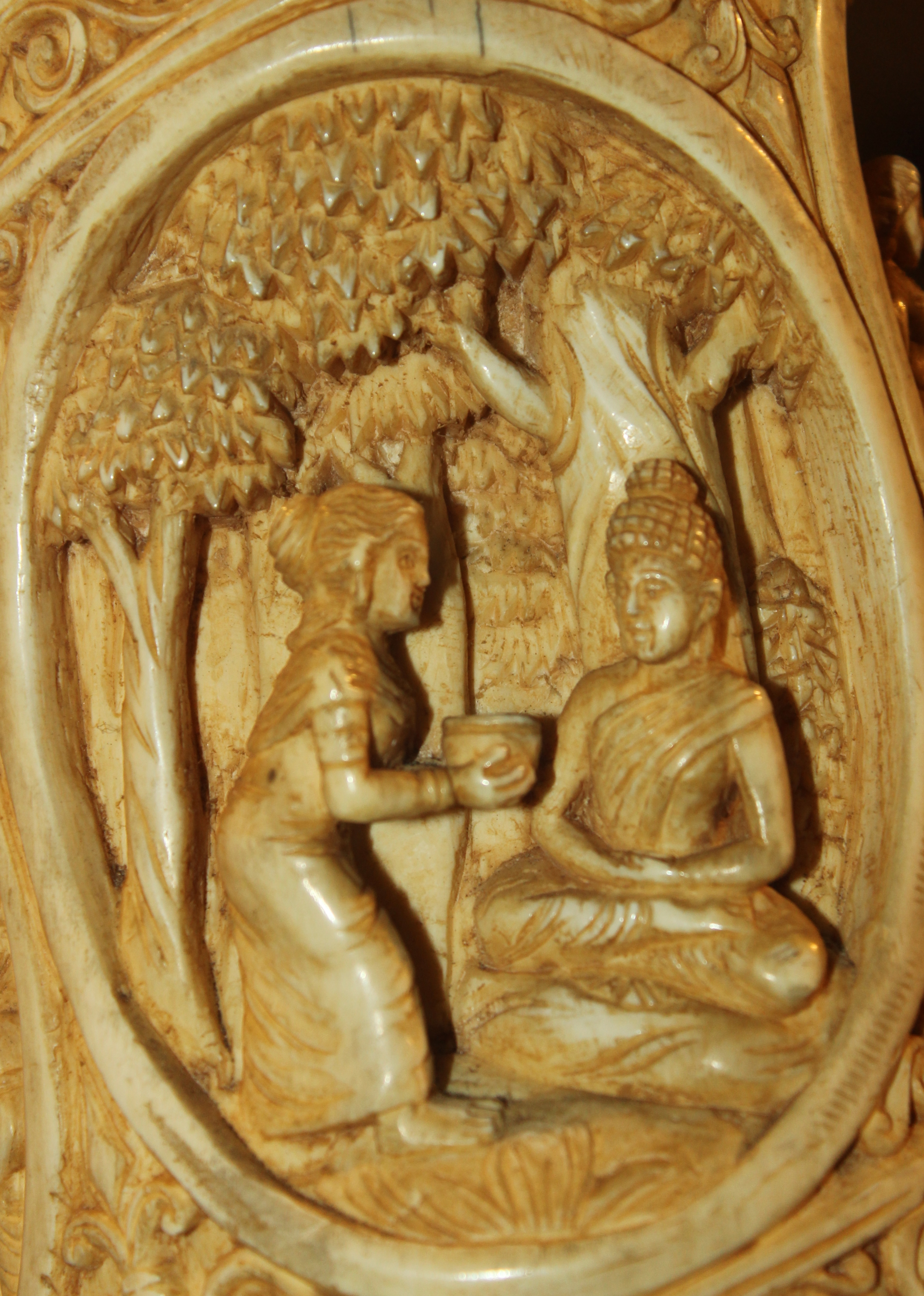
Sujata offering kheer to Buddha

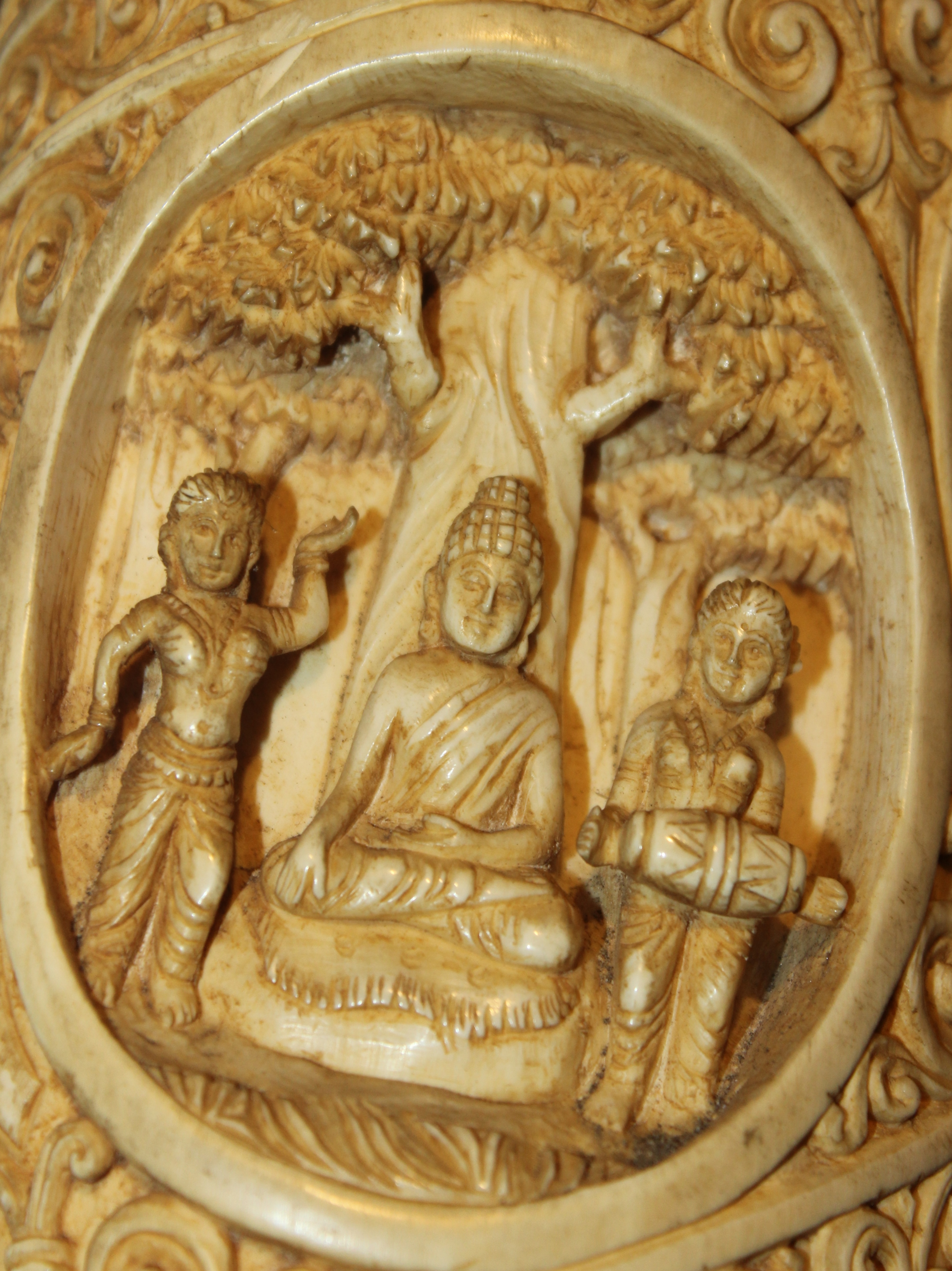
Māra tries to disturb and divert Buddha: Māra, the powerful demon arrives with the aim of preventing the Bodhisattva from attaining his goal. Māra attempts to terrify the Bodhisattva with his powerful army, and to seduce him with his daughters, but he is unable to divert the Bodhisattva from his goal. Māra gives up, defeated.

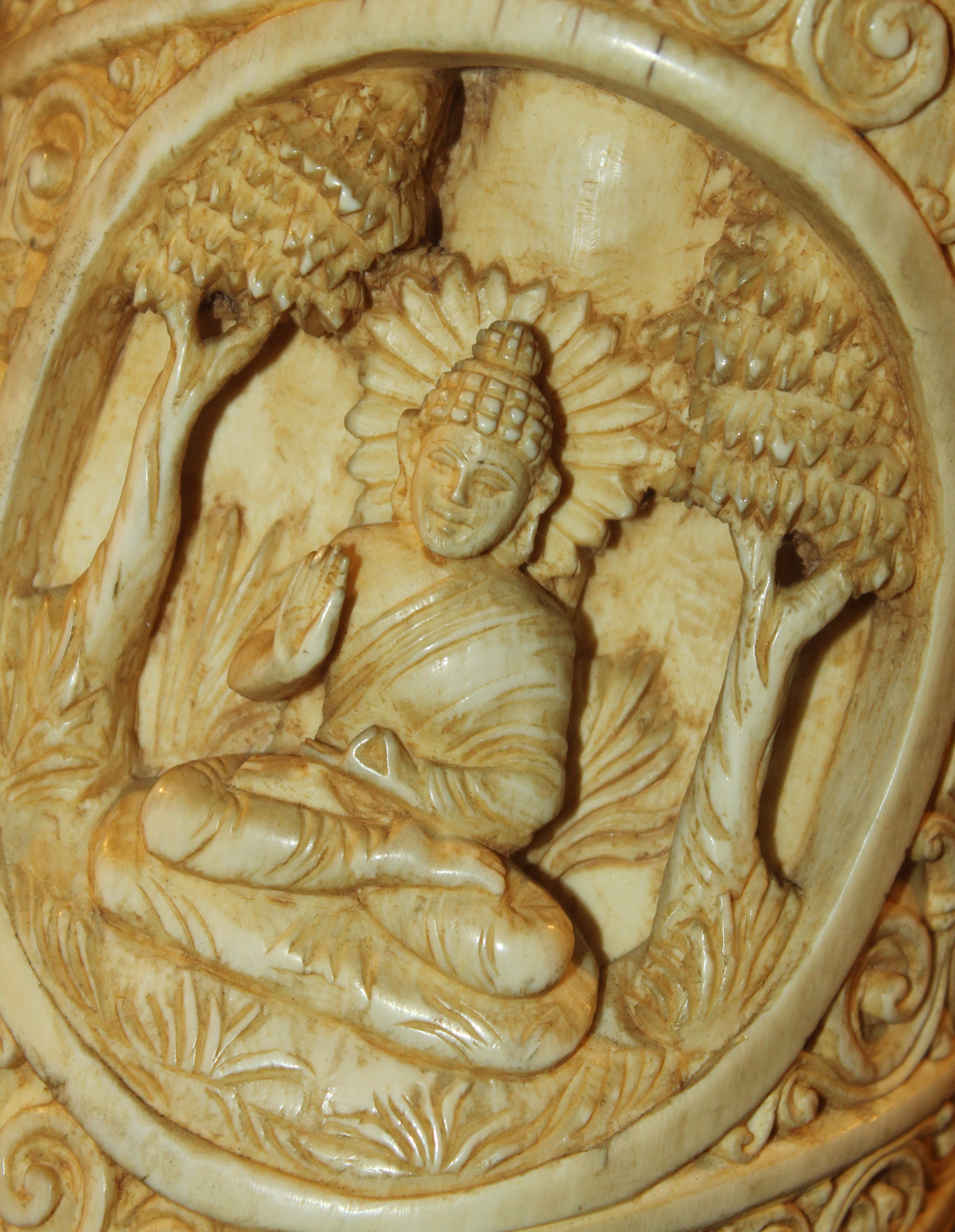
Budhha in Abhaya mudra

=== Post Enlightenment Life Events of Buddha ===
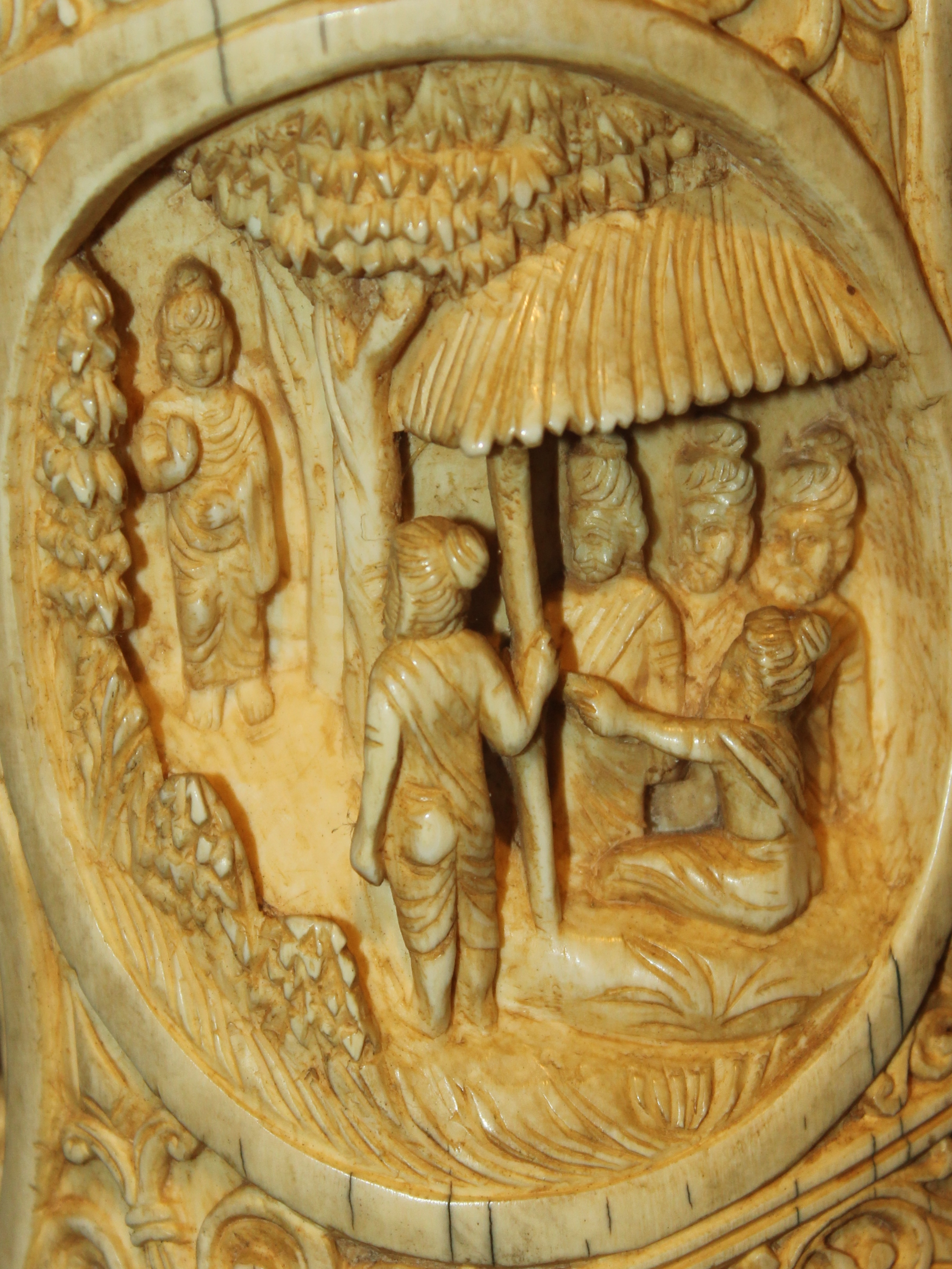
Buddha visits his five old friends, who became the first disciples: Post his enlightenment, Buddha decided to first teach Dharma to his five friends who were his companions during his ascetic practices at Bodh Gaya. His five friends were Kondanna, Bhaddiya, Vappa, Mahanama and Assaji. Buddha went to Sarnath to meet them. For the first time he taught the Four Noble Truths and the Eightfold Path.

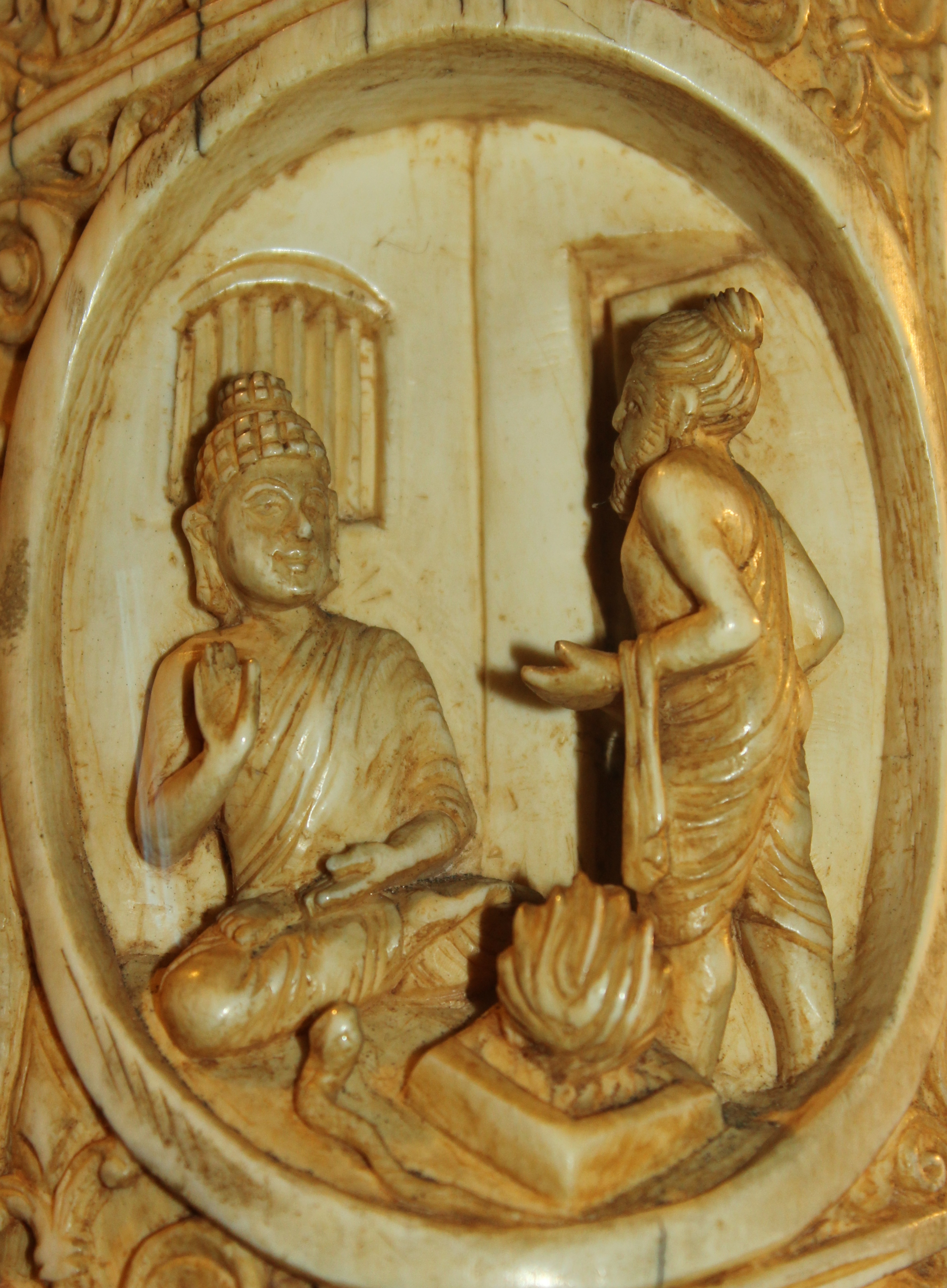
Buddha conquers the Agni-Pujaka Jatadhari Kasyapa

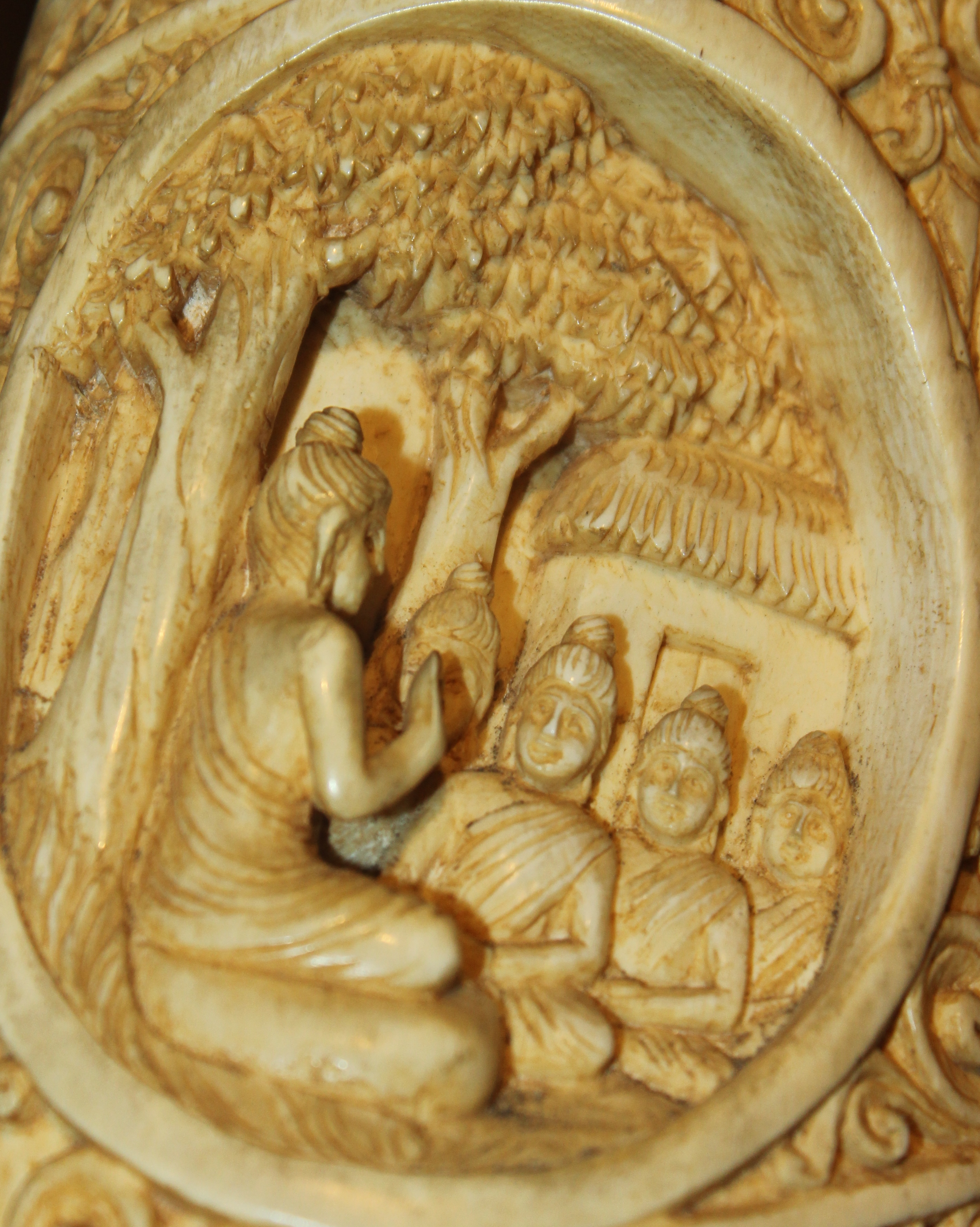
Buddha addressing the masses

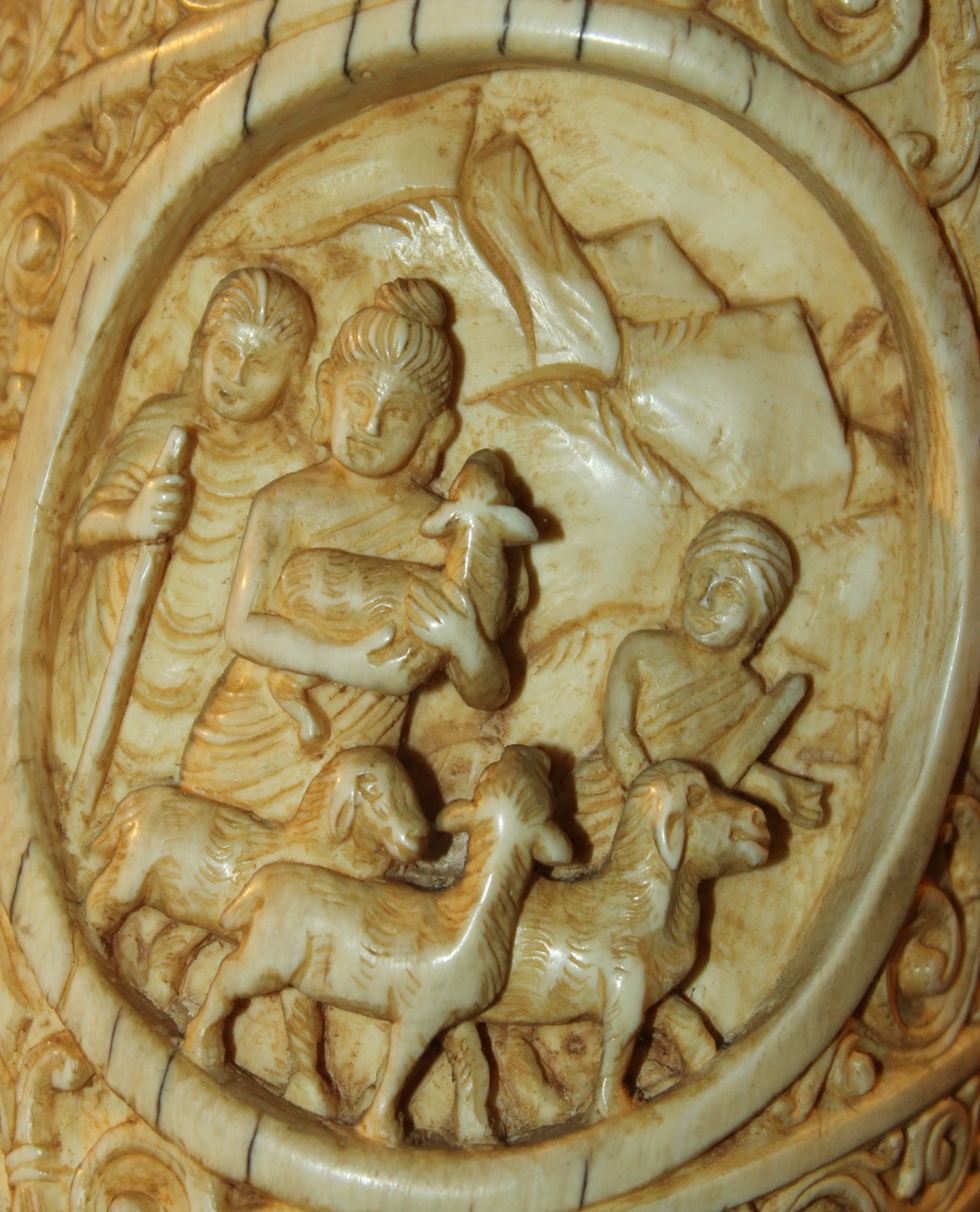
Buddha walking with a shepherd, holding a lamb

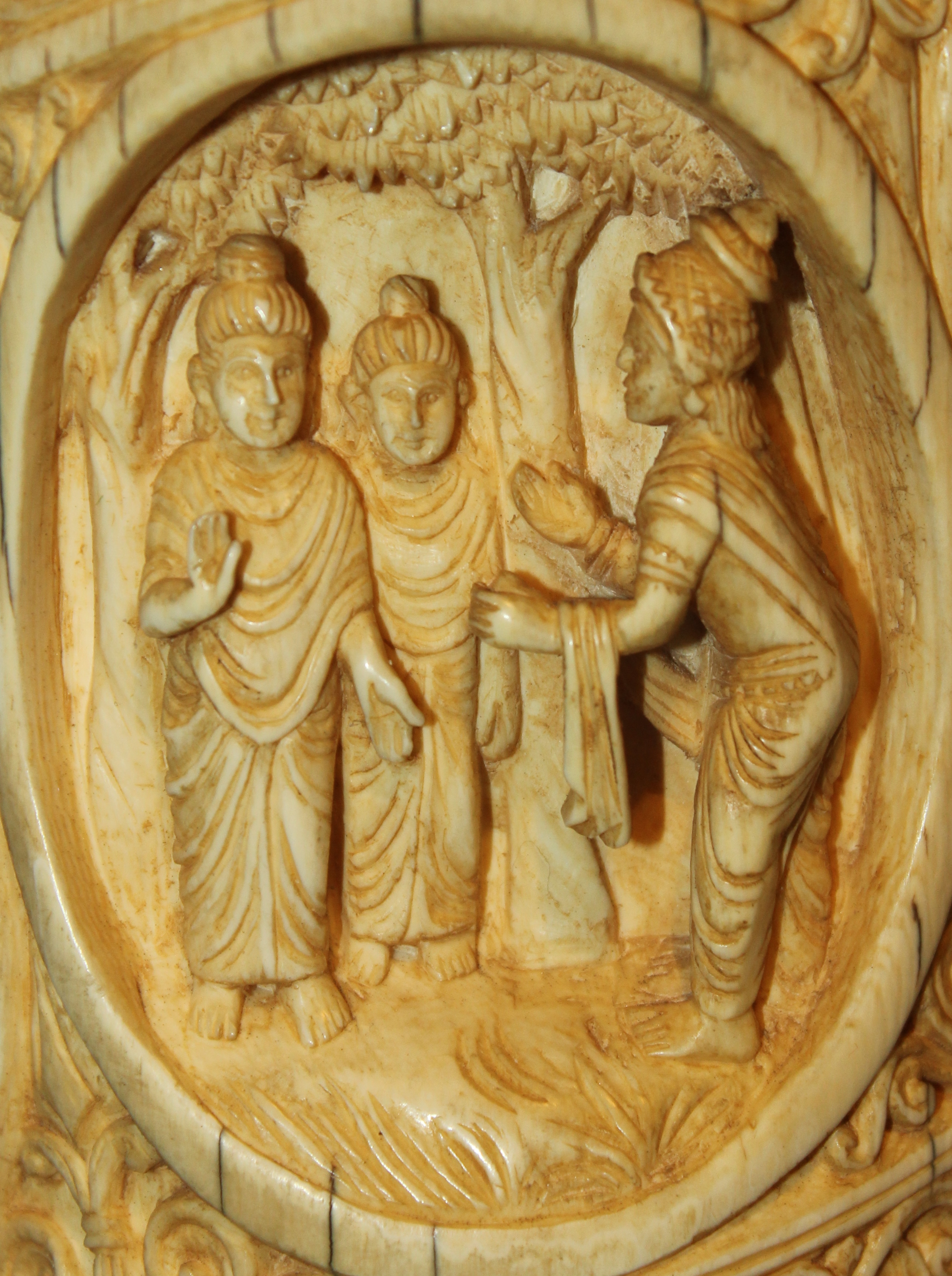
Magadh King welcoming Buddha: Buddha found patronage in emperor Bimbisāra. The emperor accepted Buddhism as his personal faith and allowed the establishment of many Buddhist vihāras. This eventually led to the renaming of the entire region as Bihār.

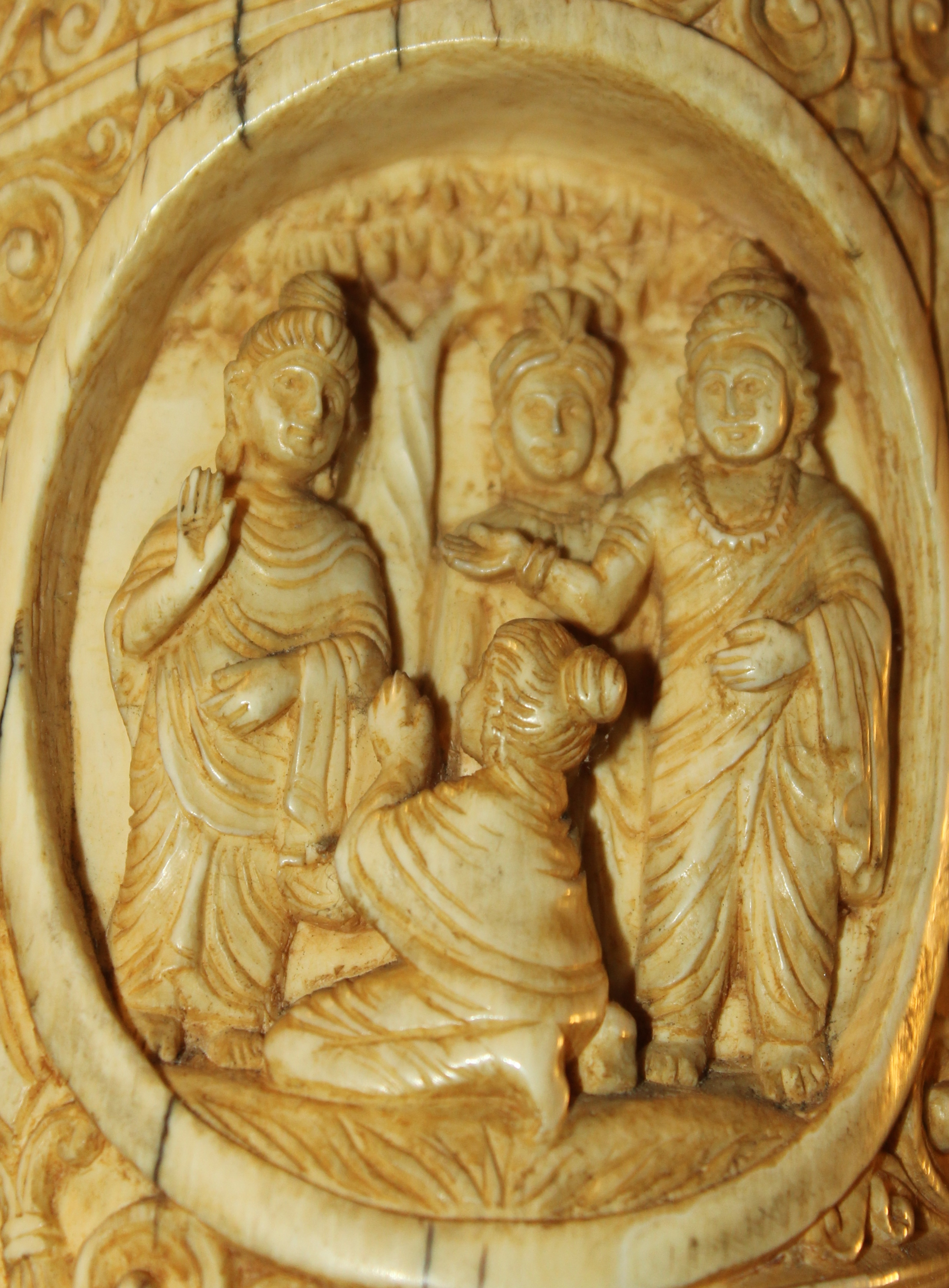
Śāriputra and Maudgalyayana become the followers of Buddha

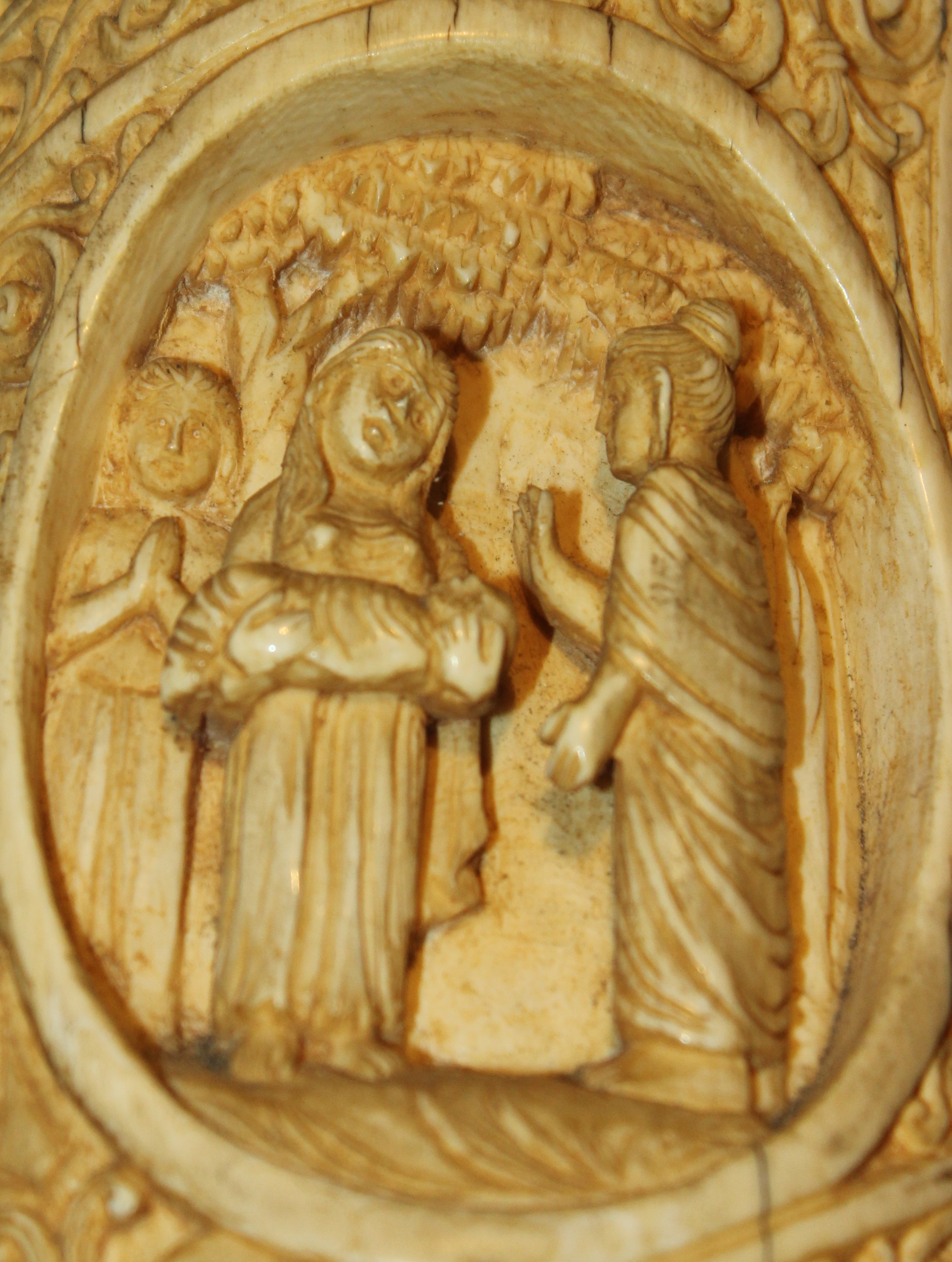
Buddha helping the grieved mother to come out from her child's birth

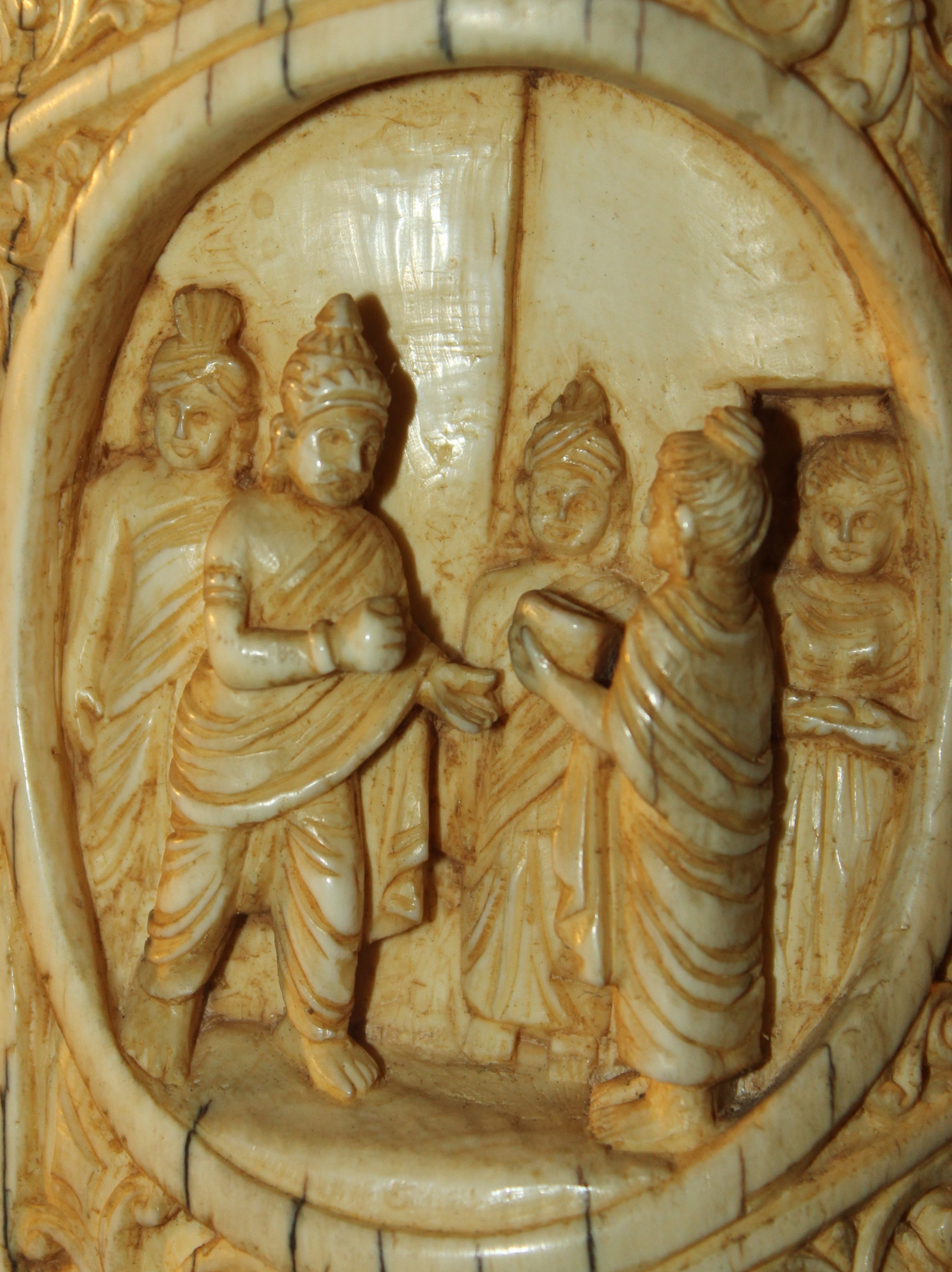
Suddhodhana welcoming Buddha at Kapilavastu

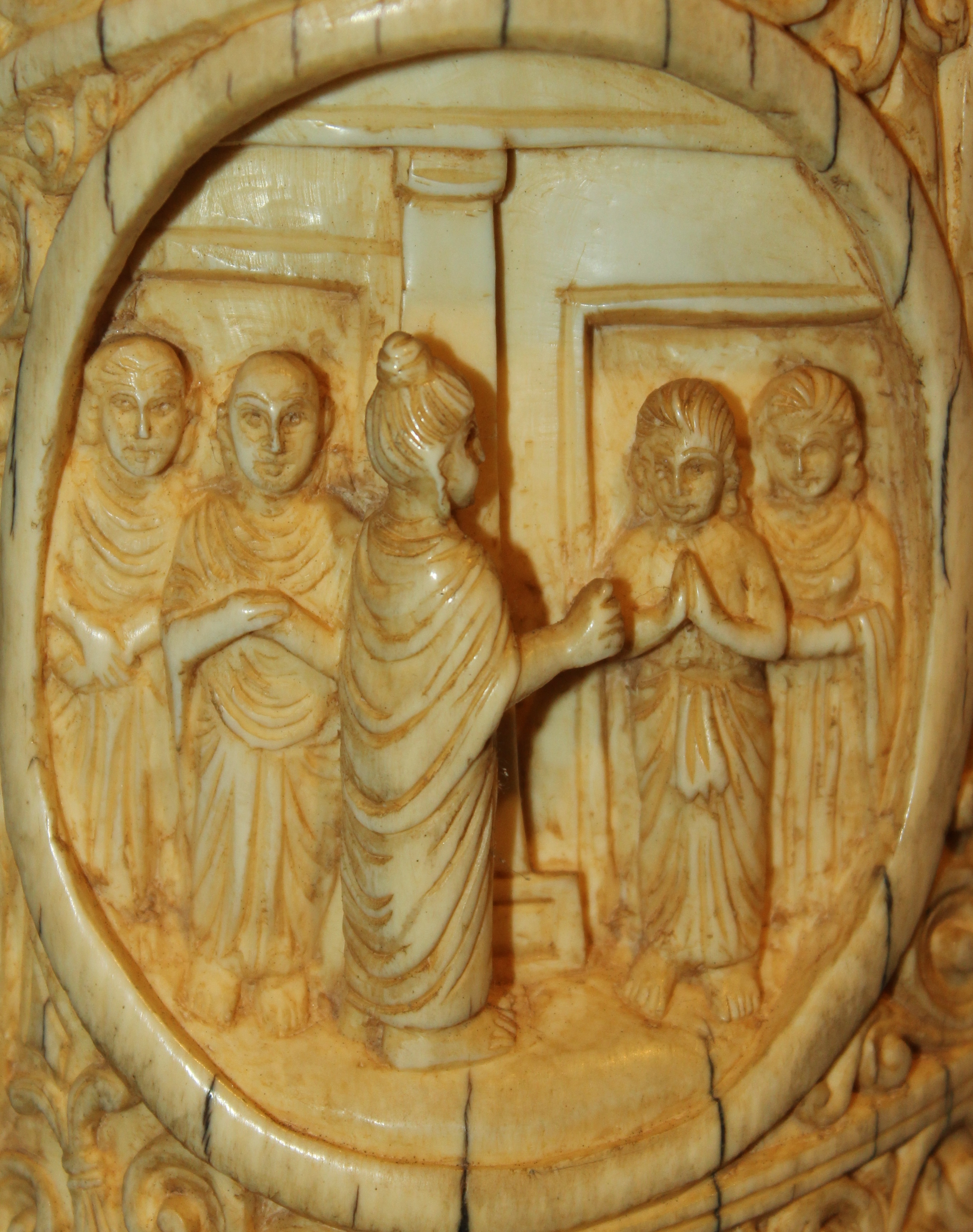
Buddha with Yasodhara and her son, Rahul

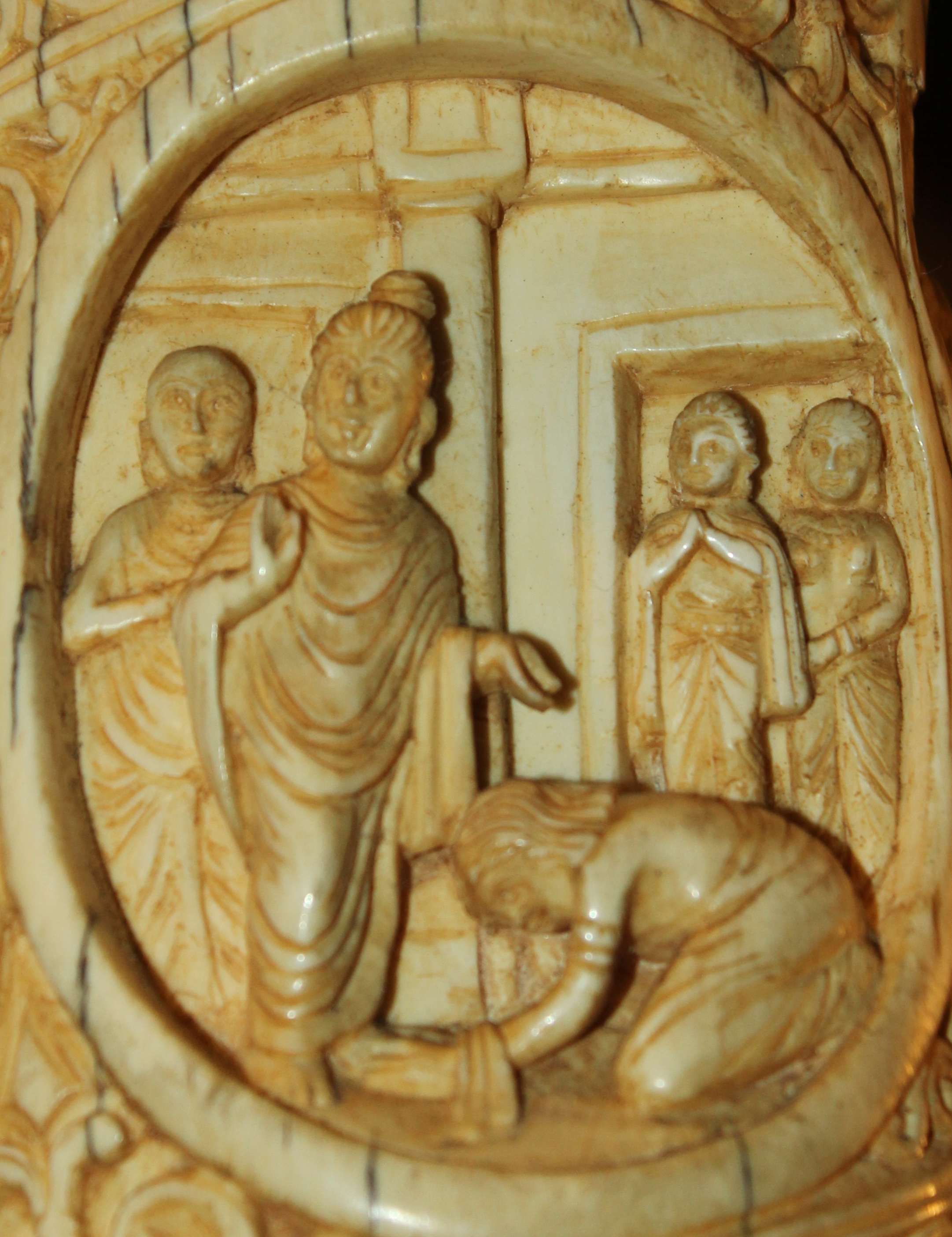
Buddha blesses Rāhula: On the advice of Yashodhara, Rāhula asked Buddha for his "inheritance". The Buddha called the venerable Sariputta and asked him to ordain Rāhula who became the first Sāmanera (novice monk). After Rāhula's ordination the Buddha taught him the importance of telling the truth. Buddha placed truth as the highest of all virtues. Rāhula subsequently became an arahant.

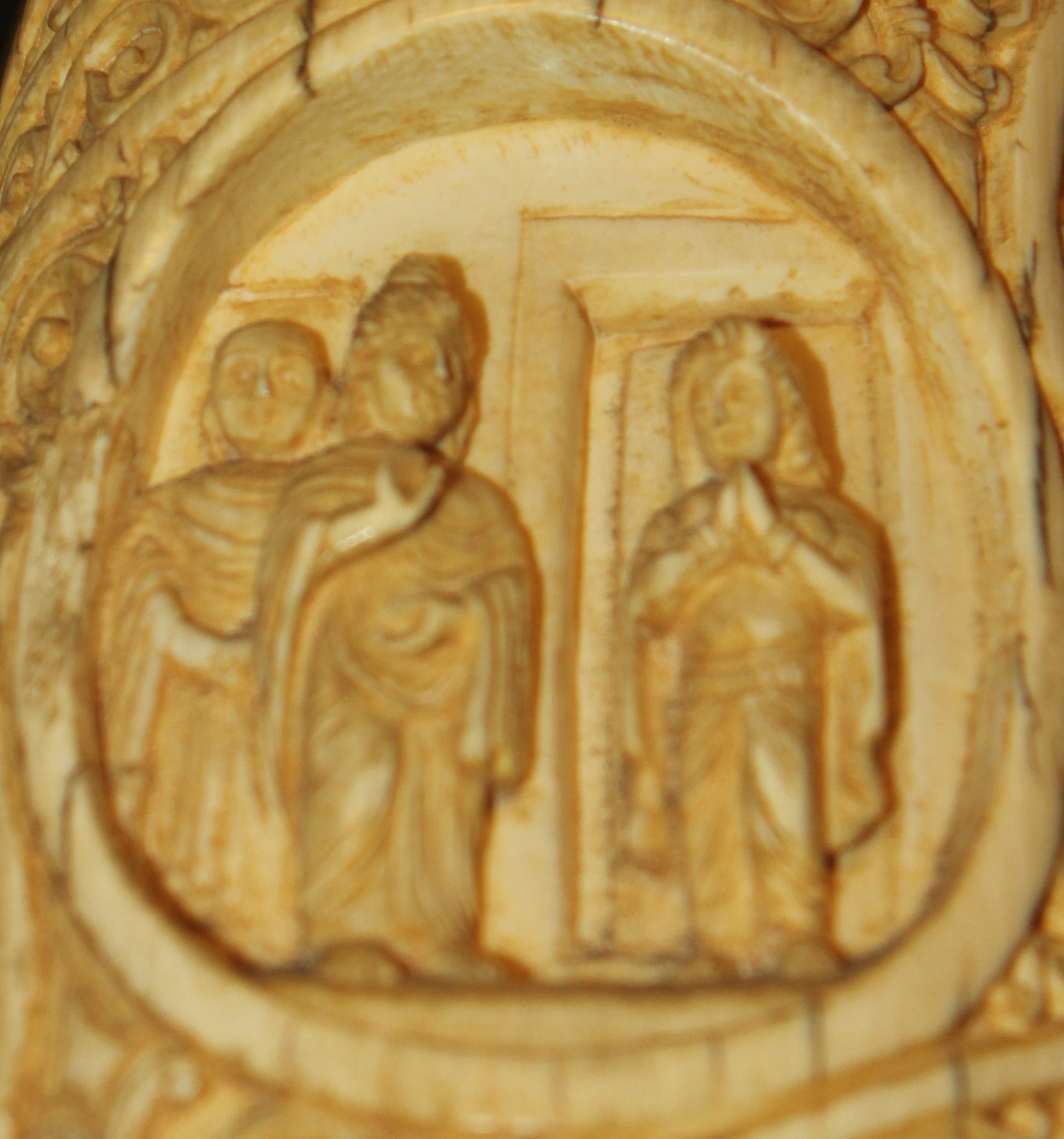
Amrapali, famous courtesan, greeting Buddha: Buddha while visiting Vaishali stayed at Amrapalli's mango grove. She invited Buddha for a meal which he accepted. She later donated the mangrove to his order. She accepted the Buddhist way, and remained an active supporter of the Buddhist order.

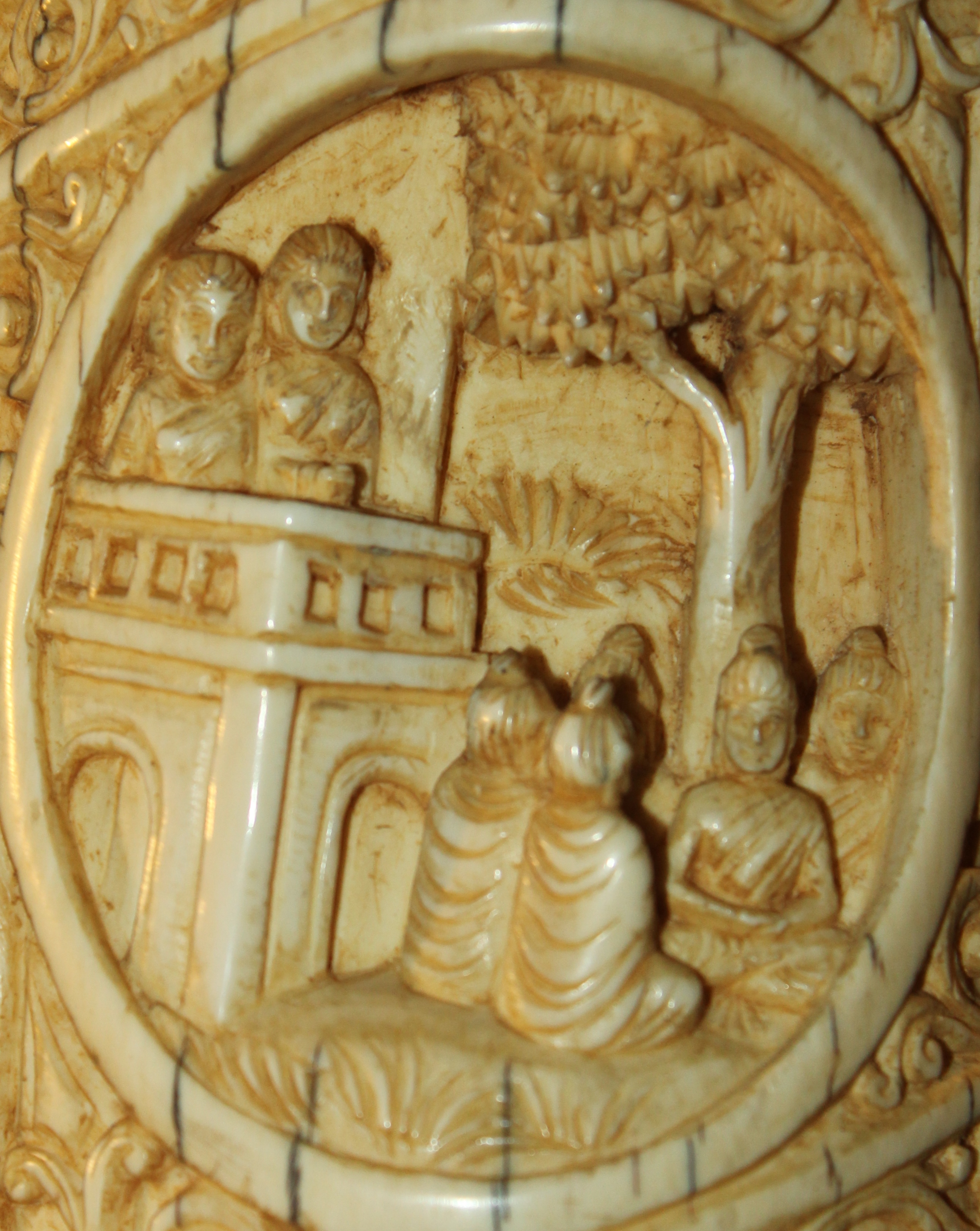
Ladies from the palace watch Buddha preaching

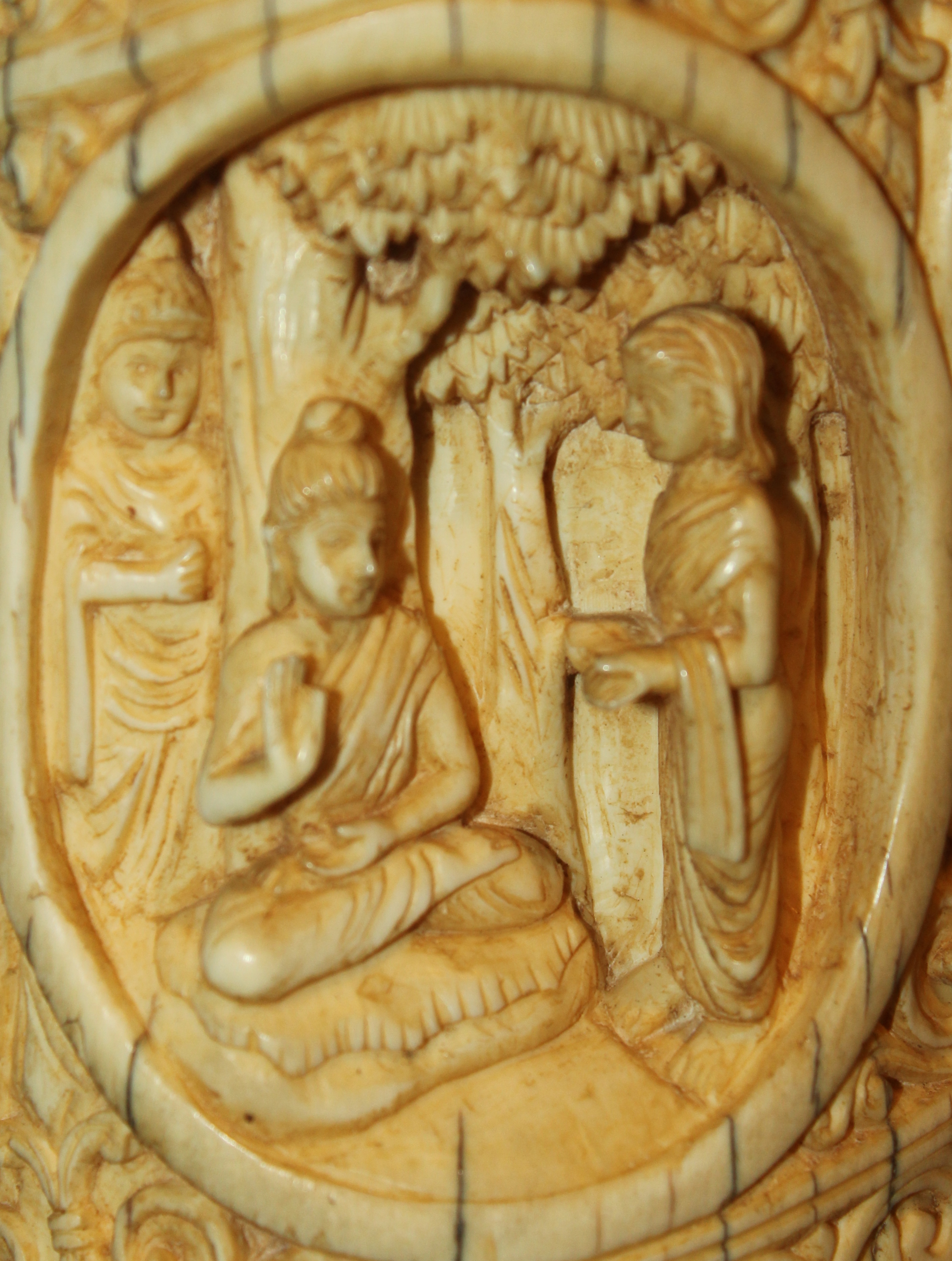
Nanda before Buddha

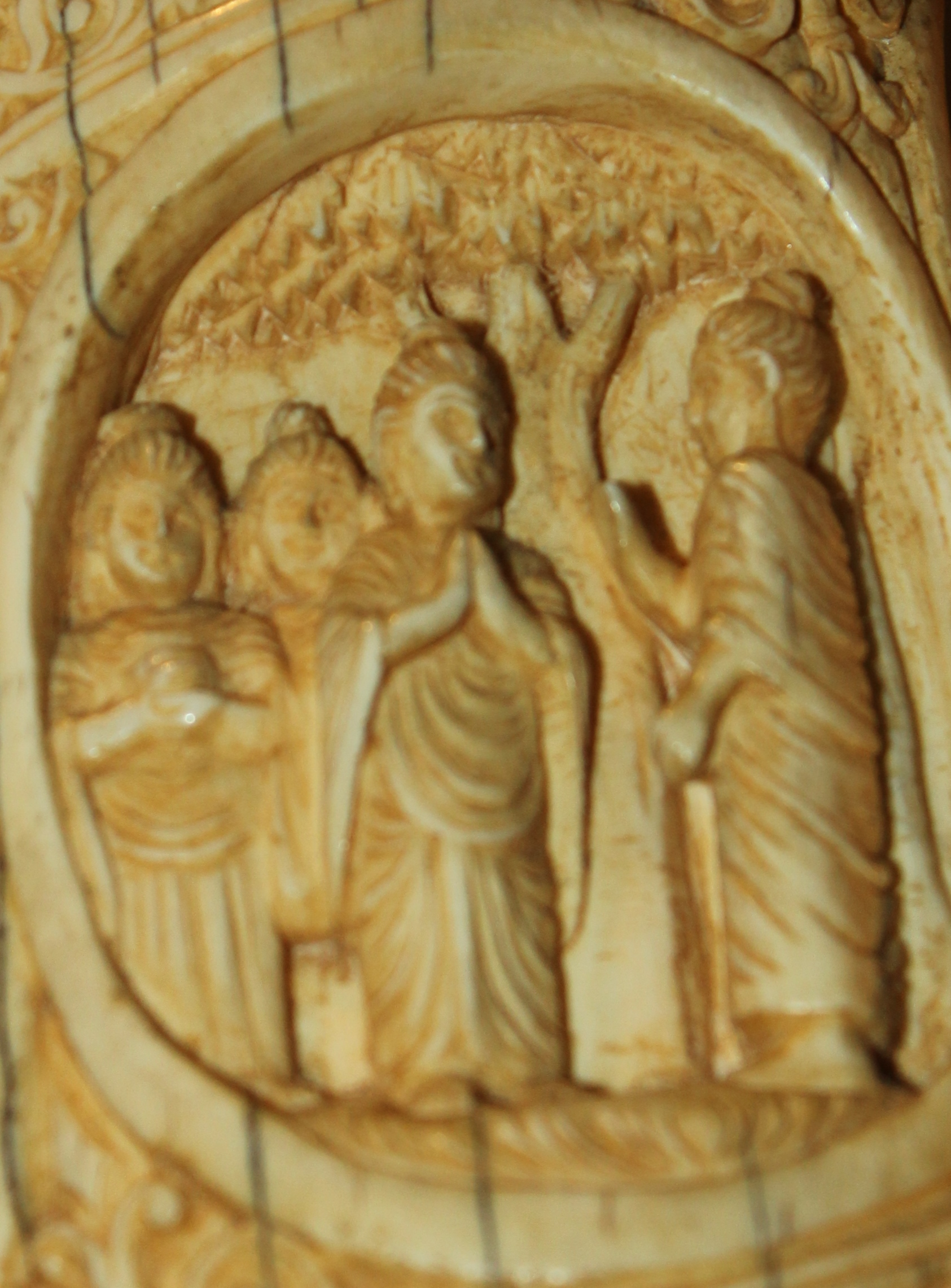
Buddha stops Nanda, who tried to escape from the Sangha

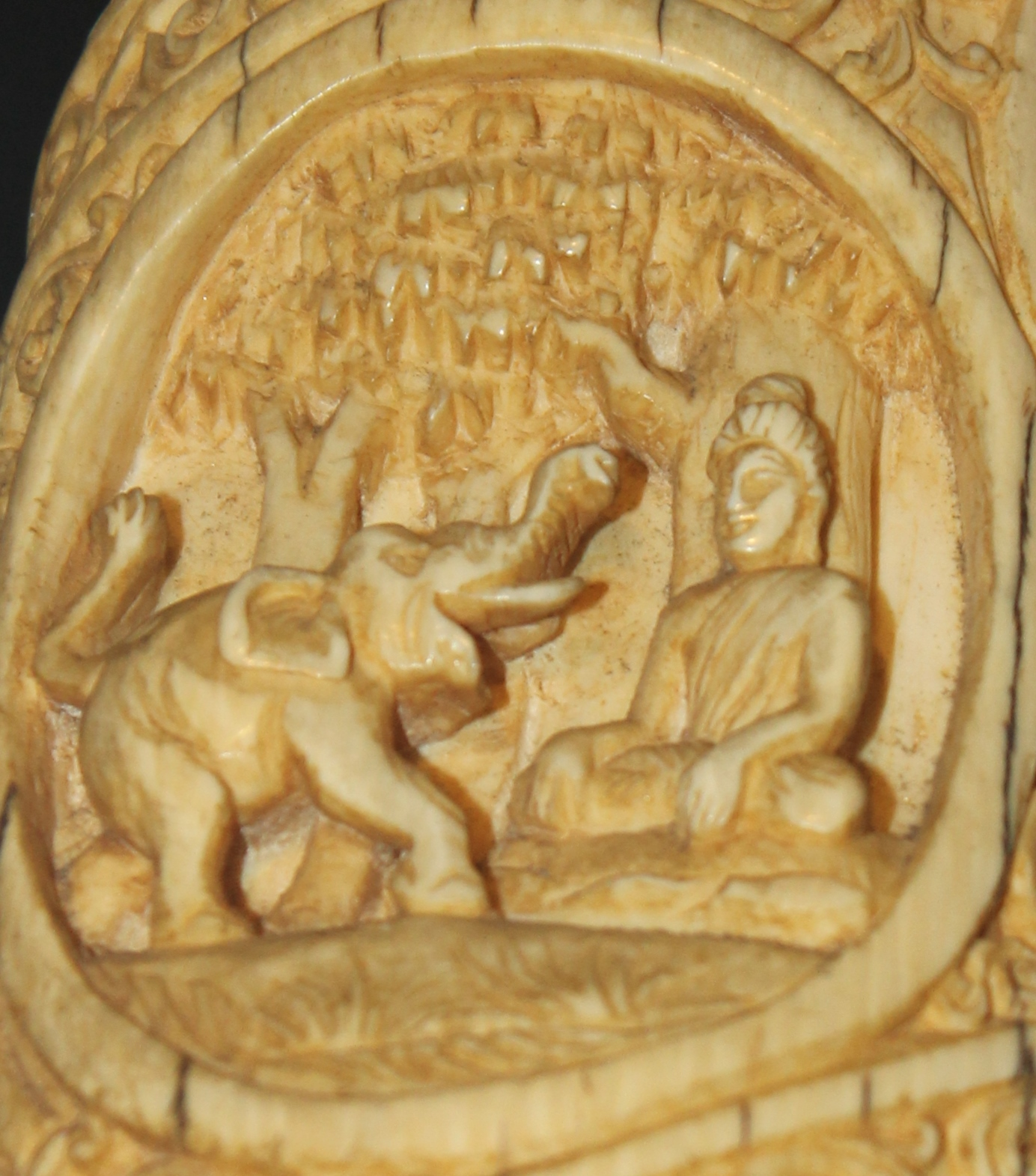
A mad elephant rushes towards Buddha

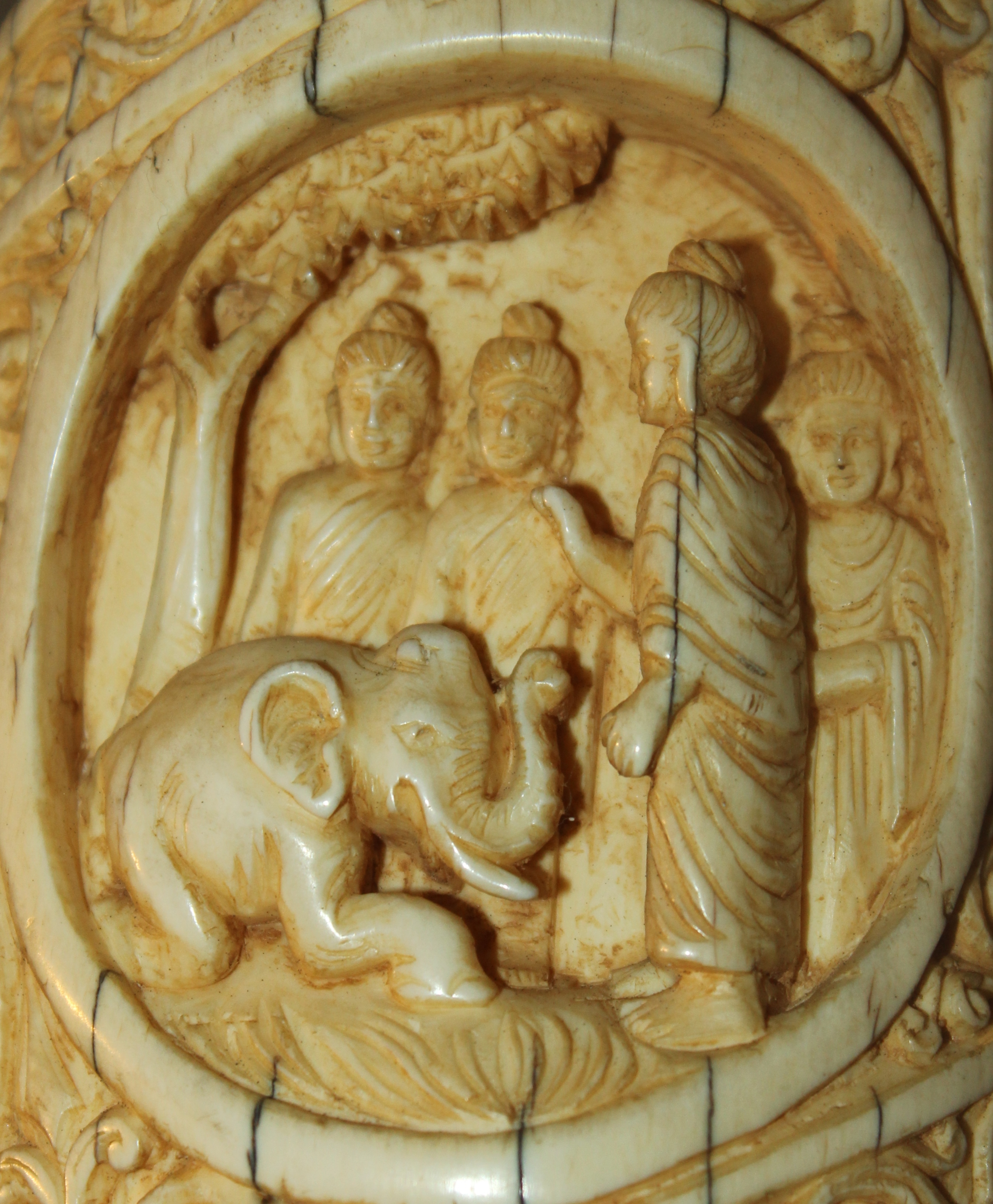
Buddha tames the mad elephant

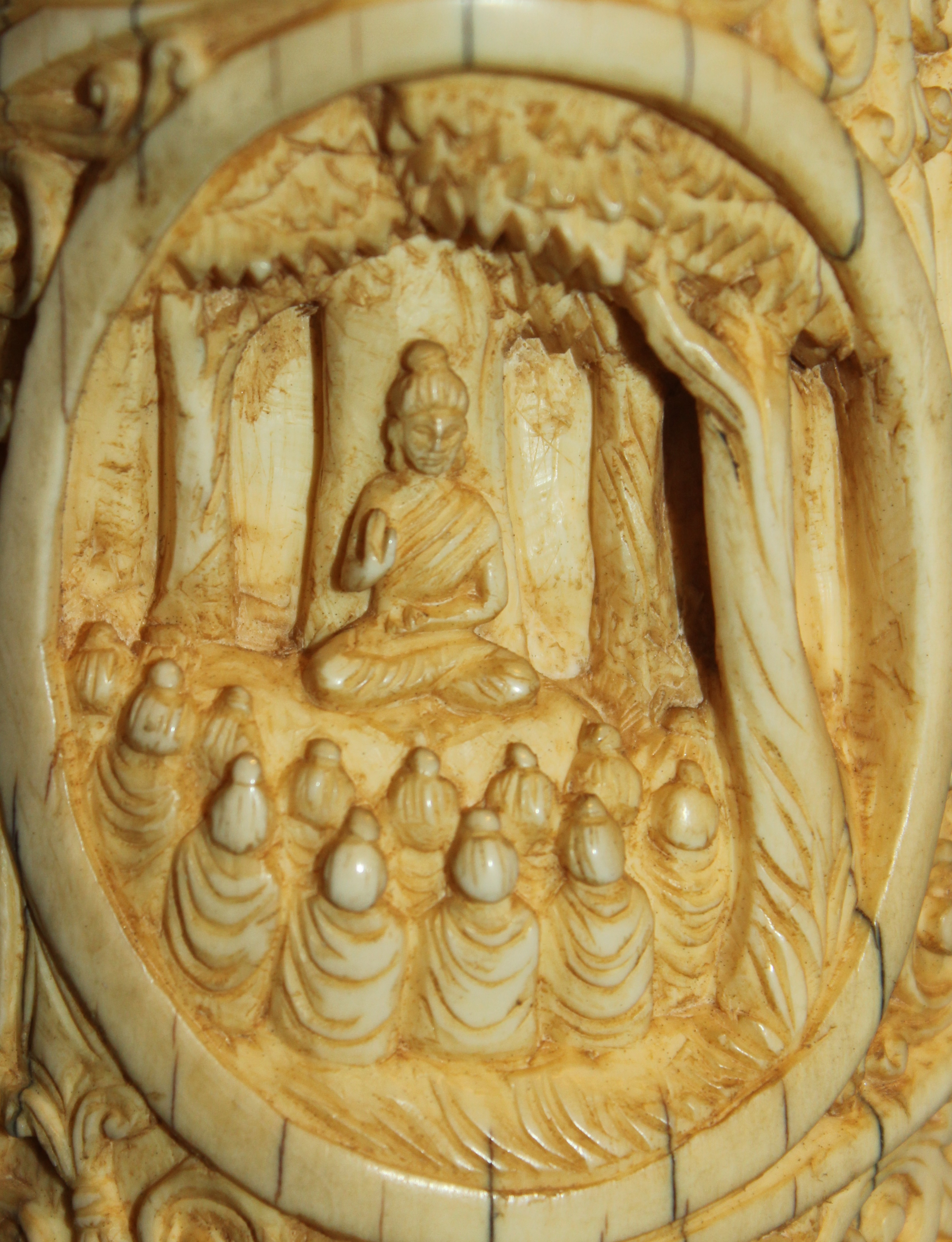
Buddha speaks to a large gathering

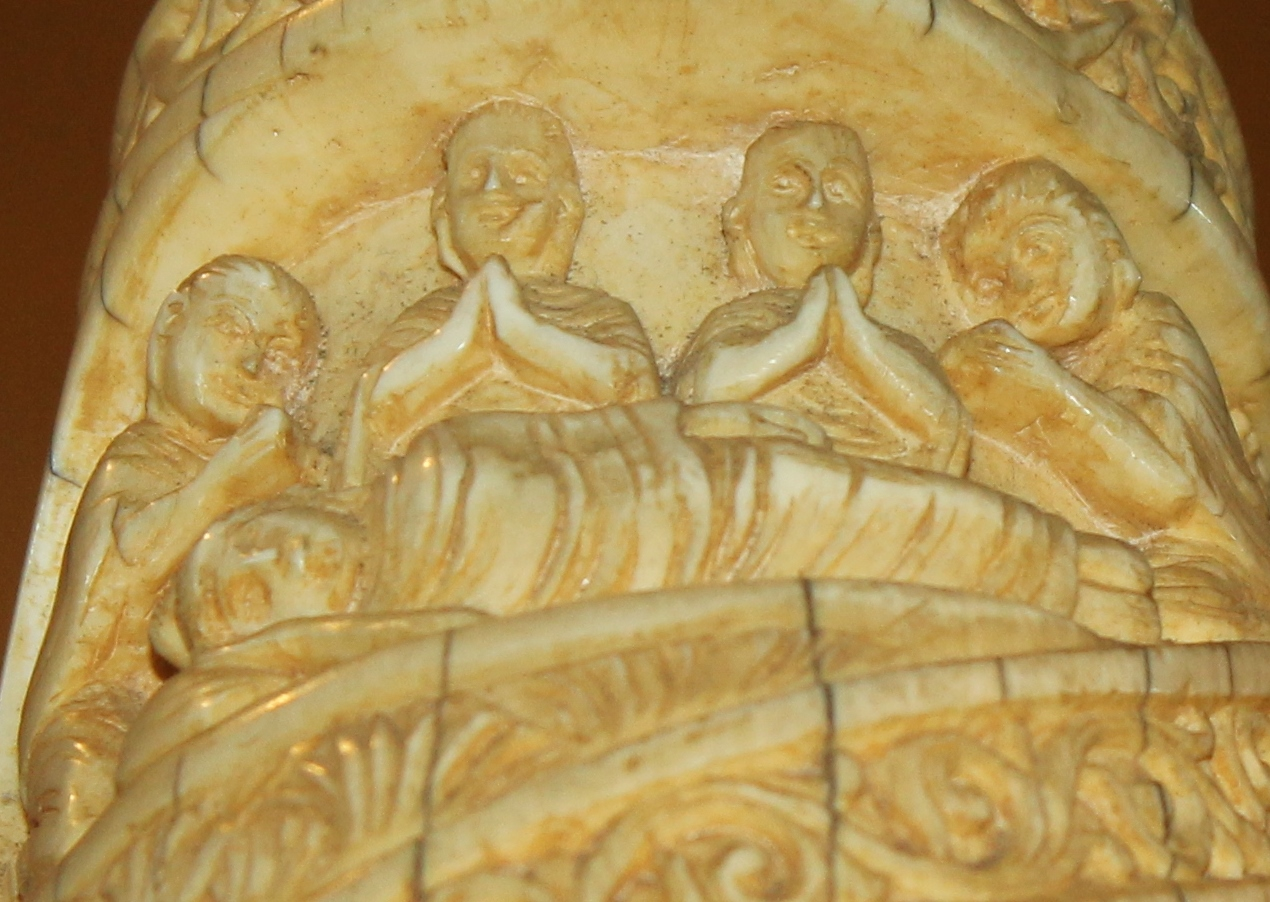
Mahaparinirvana of Buddha

=== Buddha and Mudras ===
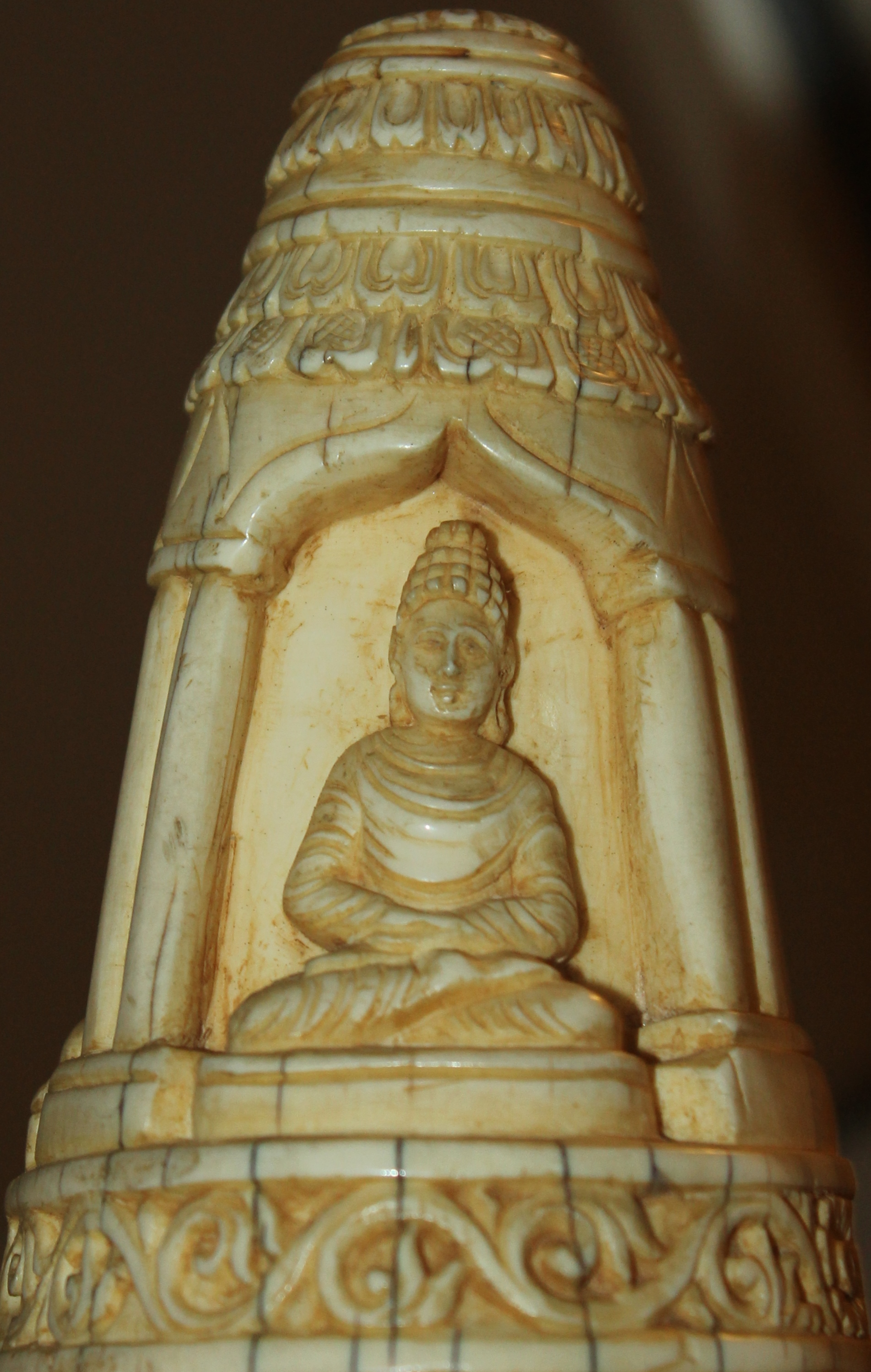
Buddha in Dhyana mudra

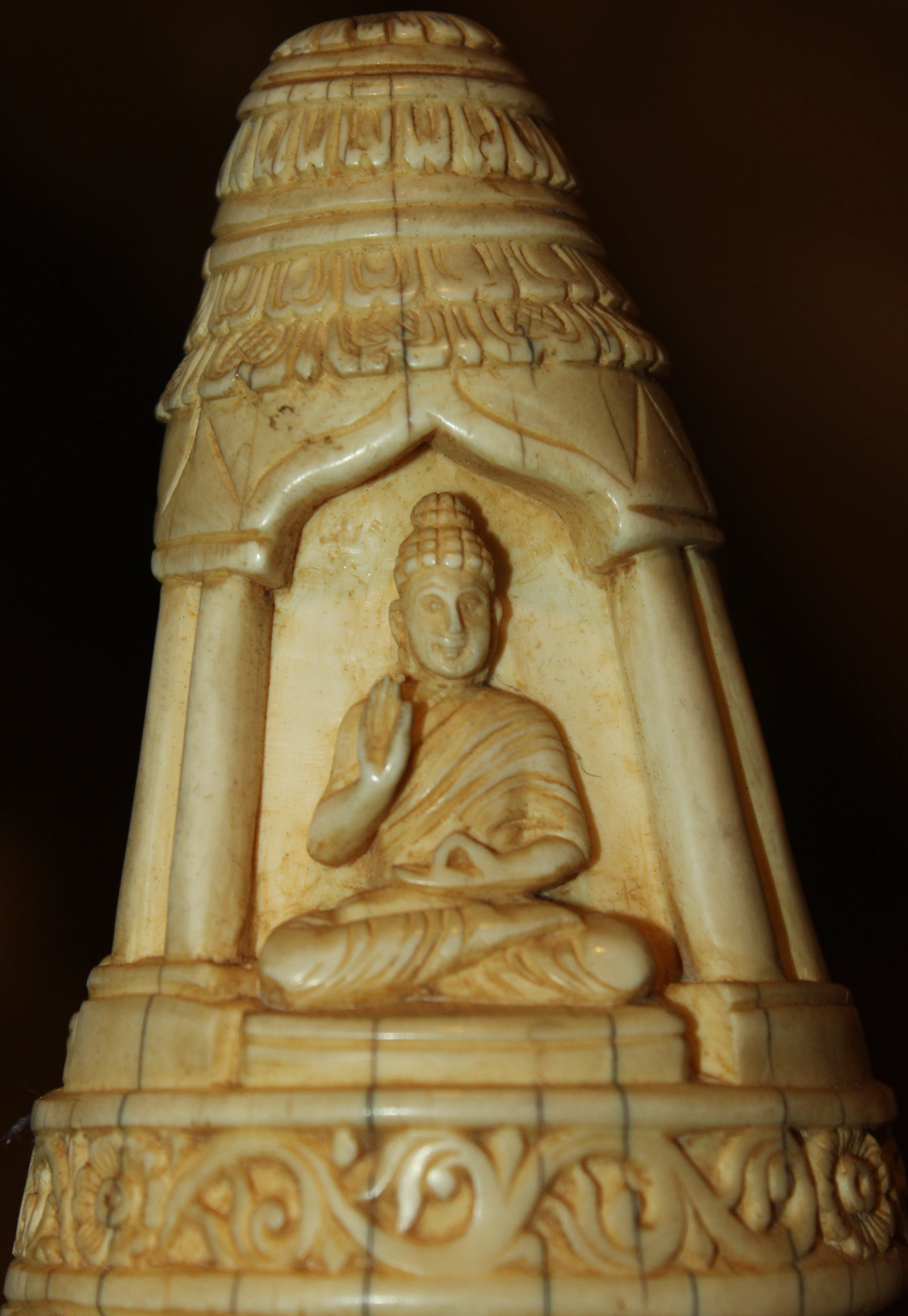
Buddha in Abhayamudra

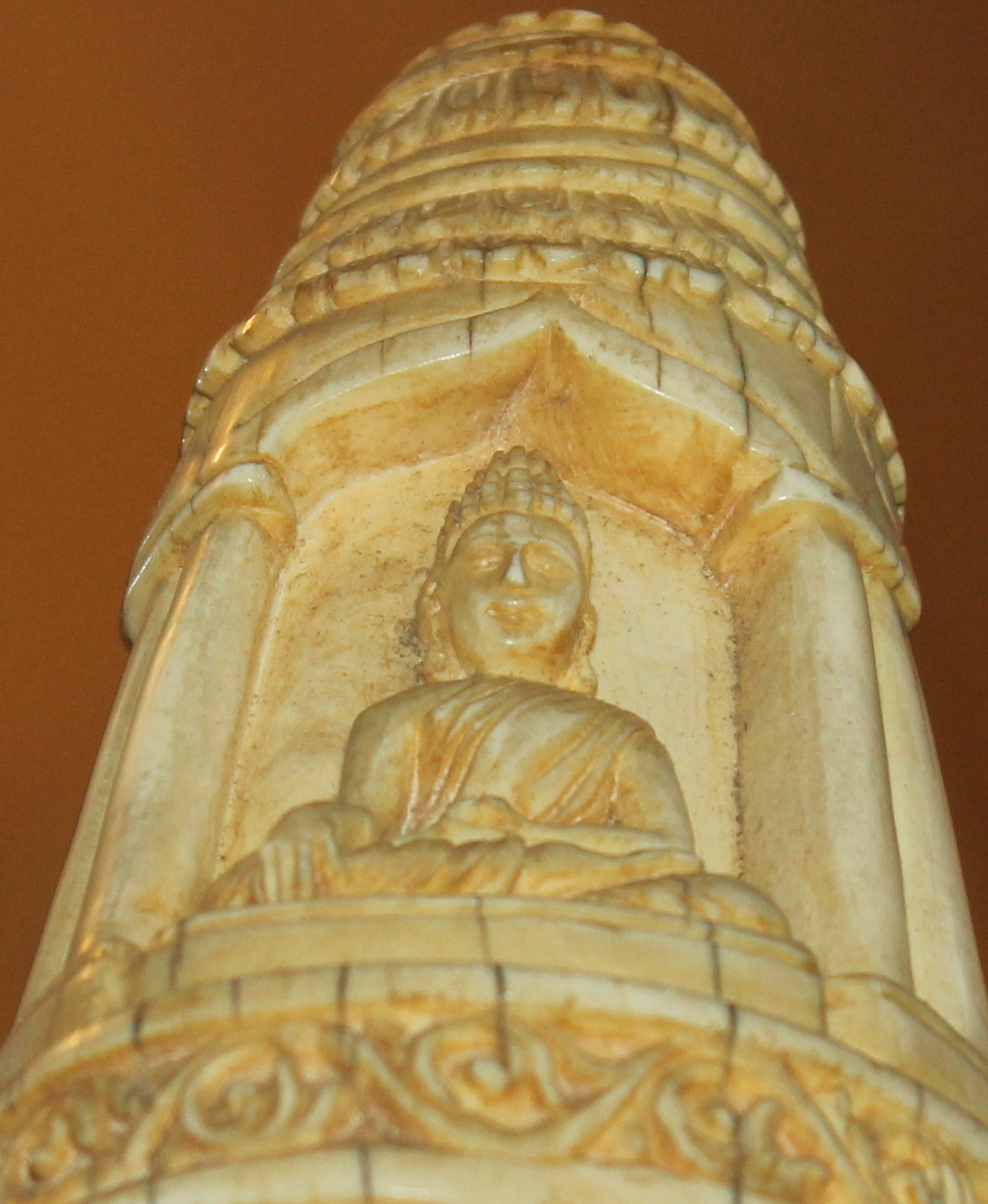
Buddha in Bhumisparsha mudra

== See also ==
- National Museum, New Delhi
- Walrus ivory
- Ivory trade
