= Carved wood vahanas in National Museum =

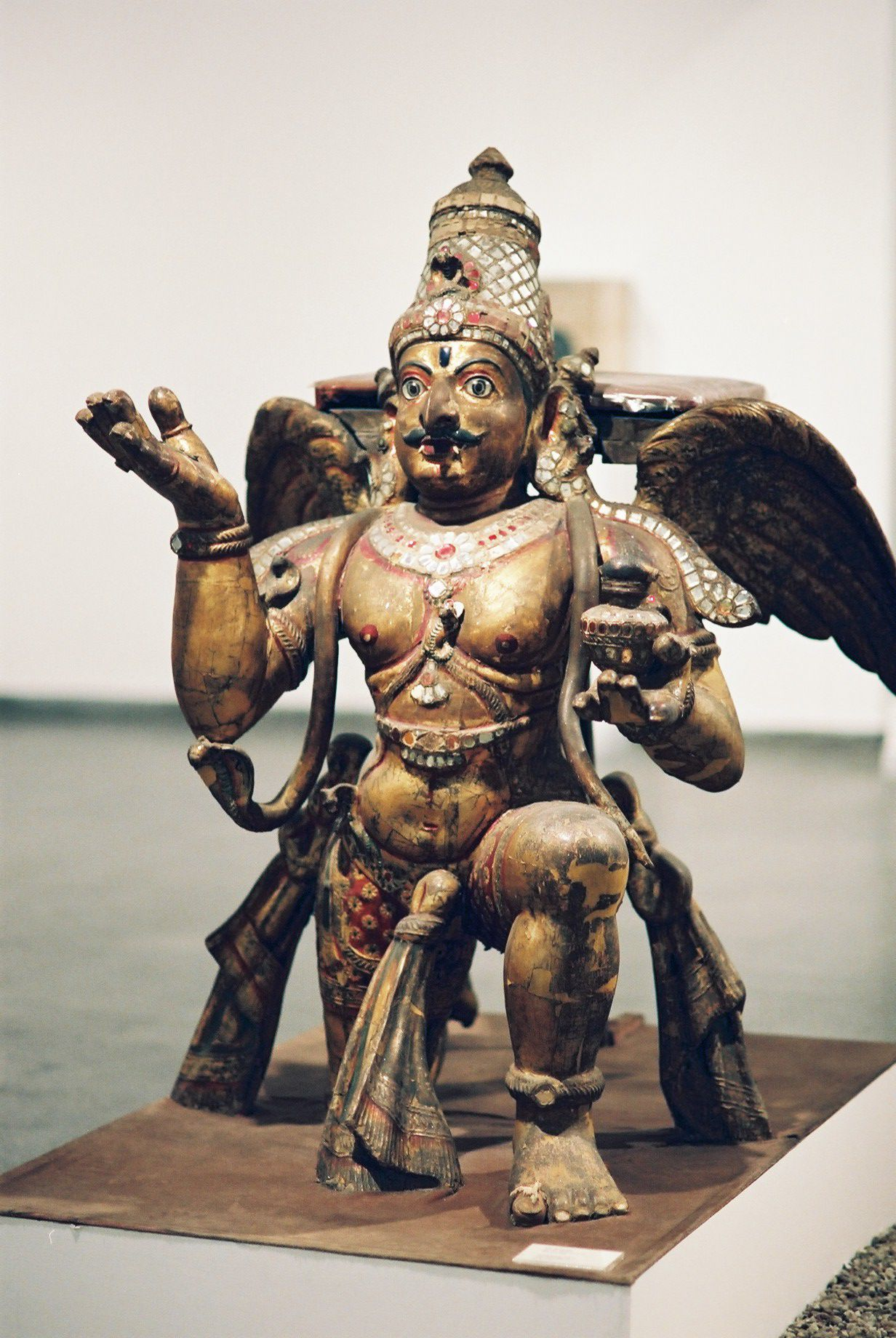
Title: Garuda (Vishnu's Vehicle) Size: 177 X 151.5 X 97.5 cm Material: Wood Provenance: South India Time: 19th Century Acc. No. 70.51

Vahanas or "vehicles" of Hindu Gods are mythical characters having significant religious value. Temples in India use depictions of these vehicles in many forms during temple processions. National Museum, New Delhi houses a collection of Carved Wood Vahanas in the gallery of decorative arts. This collection at the National Museum is unique among museums in India, which includes large images of Garuda, Hanuman, elephant, horse, swan and lion and these artefacts are mostly from the period between the 17th and 20th century. Ancient Indian temples house numerous kinds of wood carvings having religious context to be used for various temple activities. The majority of Vahanas are made of wood and decorated with designs made with varied techniques. Vahanas have been mentioned in temple inscriptions dating back to the 13th century.

== Use of vahanas ==
Vahanas are carriages of the Hindu Gods and life-sized or large versions of vahanas are especially used to mount the movable images of deities. In southern India, especially Tamil Nadu, annual religious festivals that last from a week to ten days involve the parading of deities mounted on a vehicle around the temple.

== Symbolism ==
The vahanas are both the symbol and the emblem of the deity that they carry. In Hindu iconography, positive aspects of the vehicle are often emblematic of the deity that it carries such as Nandi, the bull, vehicle of Shiva, represents strength and virility. Parvani the peacock, vehicle of Kartikeya, represents splendor and majesty. The Hamsa, vehicle of Saraswati, represents wisdom, grace and beauty.

However, the vehicle animal can also symbolizes the evil forces over which the deity dominates. Mounted on Parvani, Kartikeya reins in the peacock's vanity. Seated on the "Mushika", Ganesh crushes useless thoughts, which multiply like rats in the dark. Shani, protector of property, has a vulture, raven or crow in which he represses thieving tendencies. Under Shani's influence, the vahana can make even malevolent events bring hope.

== The Artefacts ==
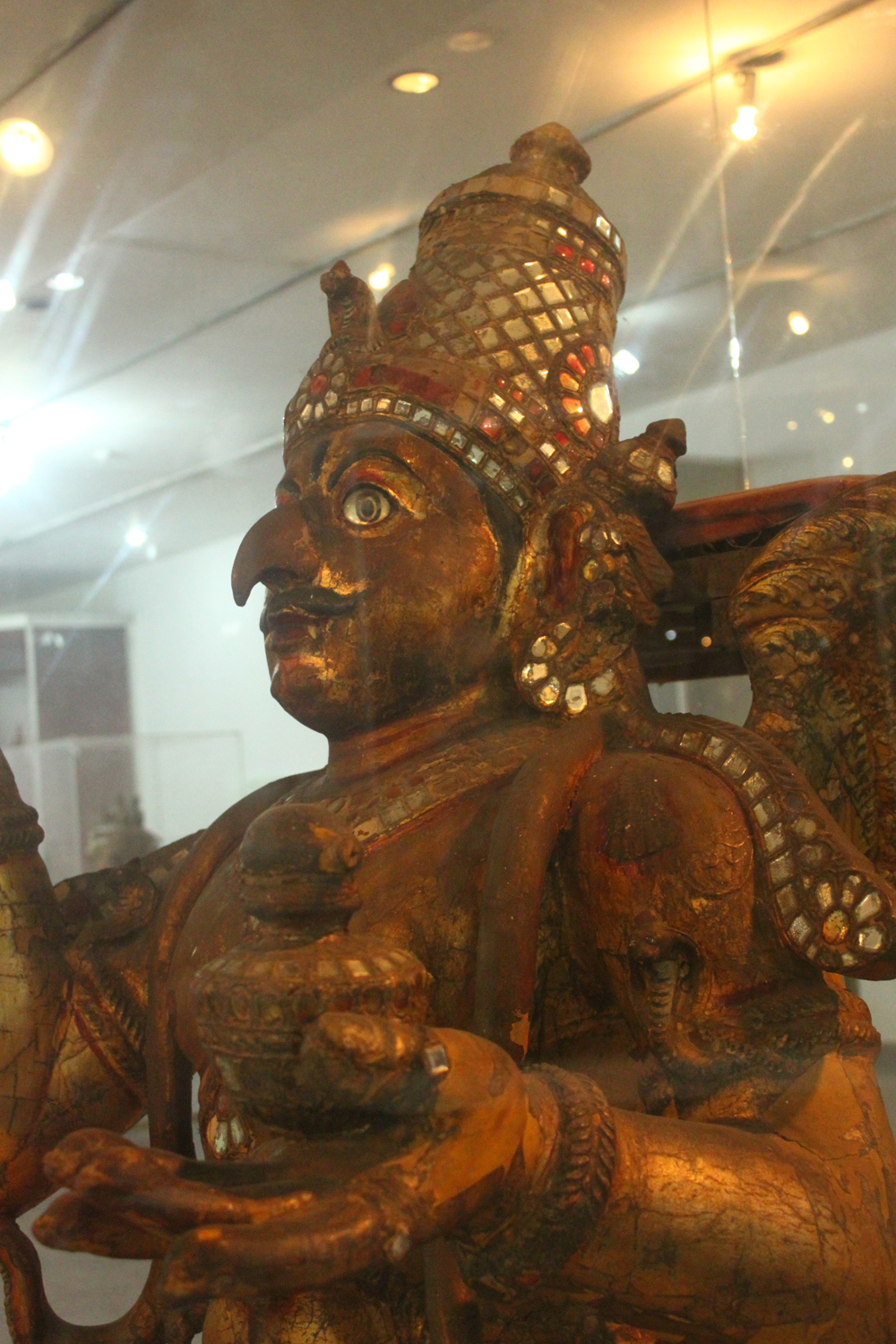
Closeup of Garuda

- Garuda (Vishnu's vehicle), wood, South India, 19th Century

This is a huge image of Garuda from Tamil Nadu, made of wood, painted and fixed with glass pieces. It is a large mythical bird in Hindu Mythology, usually the mount (Vahana) of Lord Vishnu. It is made in Human form having a body of a strong man with a human face, wings, Eagle beak like nose with a crown on his head. This was once a part of temple chariot procession Ratha-Utsava

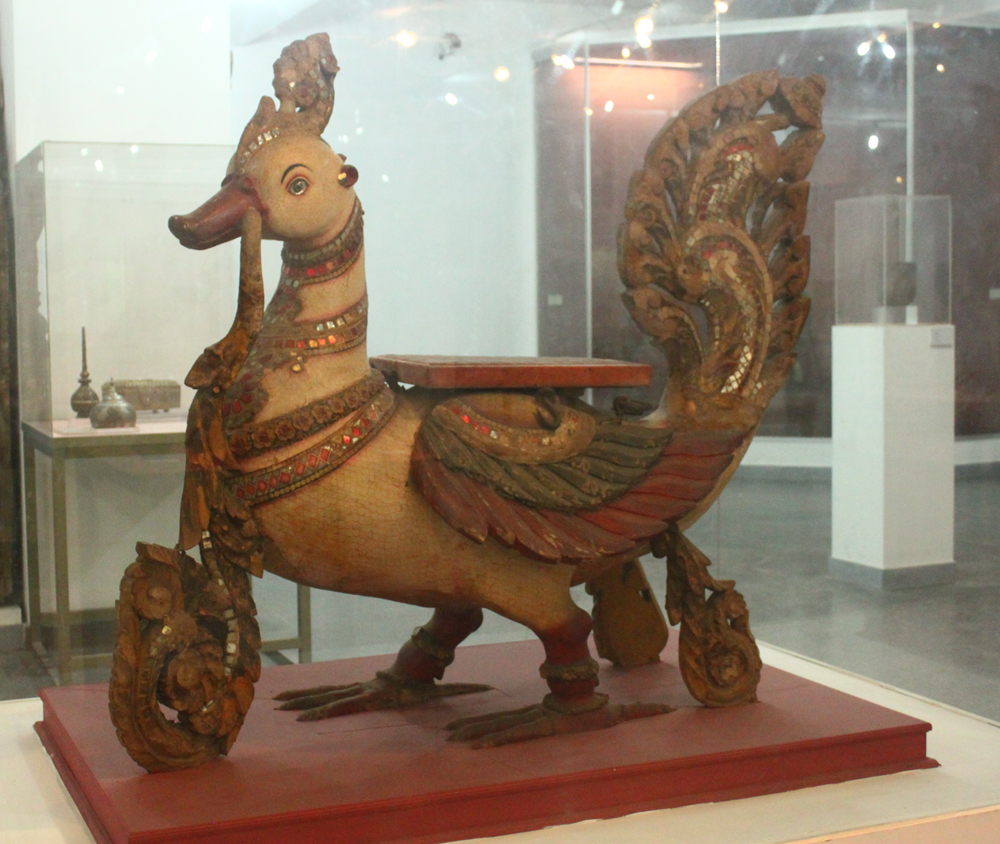
Title: Peacock (Kartikeya's Vehicle) Material: Wood Provenance: Tanjore(South India) Time: 19th Century Acc. No. 70.52

- Peacock (Kartikeya vehicle, wood & glass, Tanjore, South India, 19th Century

This mayura vahana (peacock vehicle) is the mount of Lord Kartikeya or Murugan. It was carved in Tamil Nadu. This peacock vehicle would have been used in similar temple processions. Tanjore is one of the well known centres of wood carving of South India. Life size figures of peacock, beautifully carved and painted are found here known to be The vehicle of Subramaniyam.

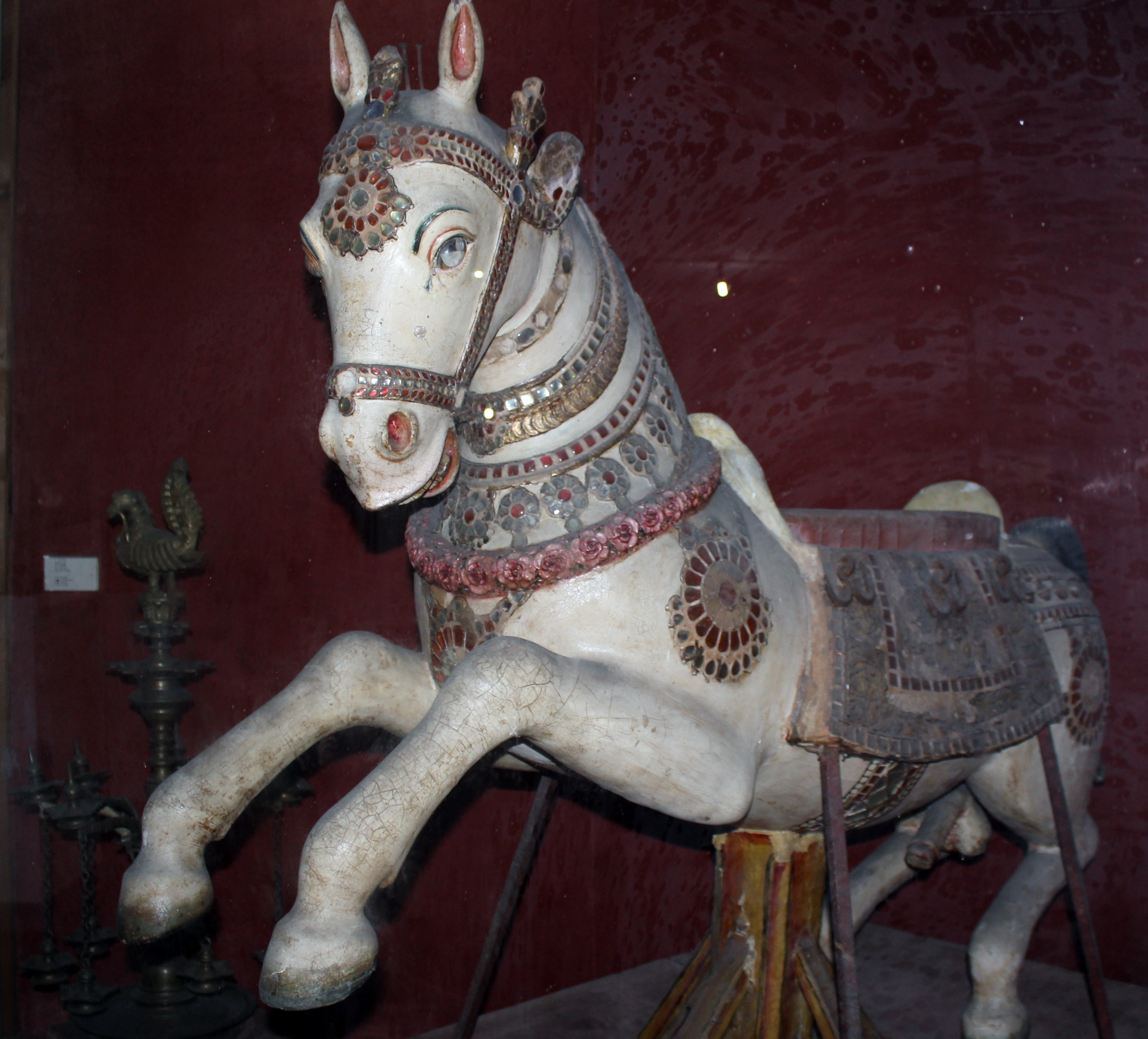
Title: Horse Size:178 X 183 X 112cm Material: Wood Provenance: Tanjore(South India) Time: 19th Century Acc. No. 70.52

- Horse, wood, Tanjore, South India, 19th Century Ayyappan, Budha, Revanta, Chandra (chariot of 10 white horses), Indra (chariot pulled by a horse named Uchchaihshravas - pictured), Surya (chariot pulled by seven horses or a seven-headed horse), Kubera, Kalki.

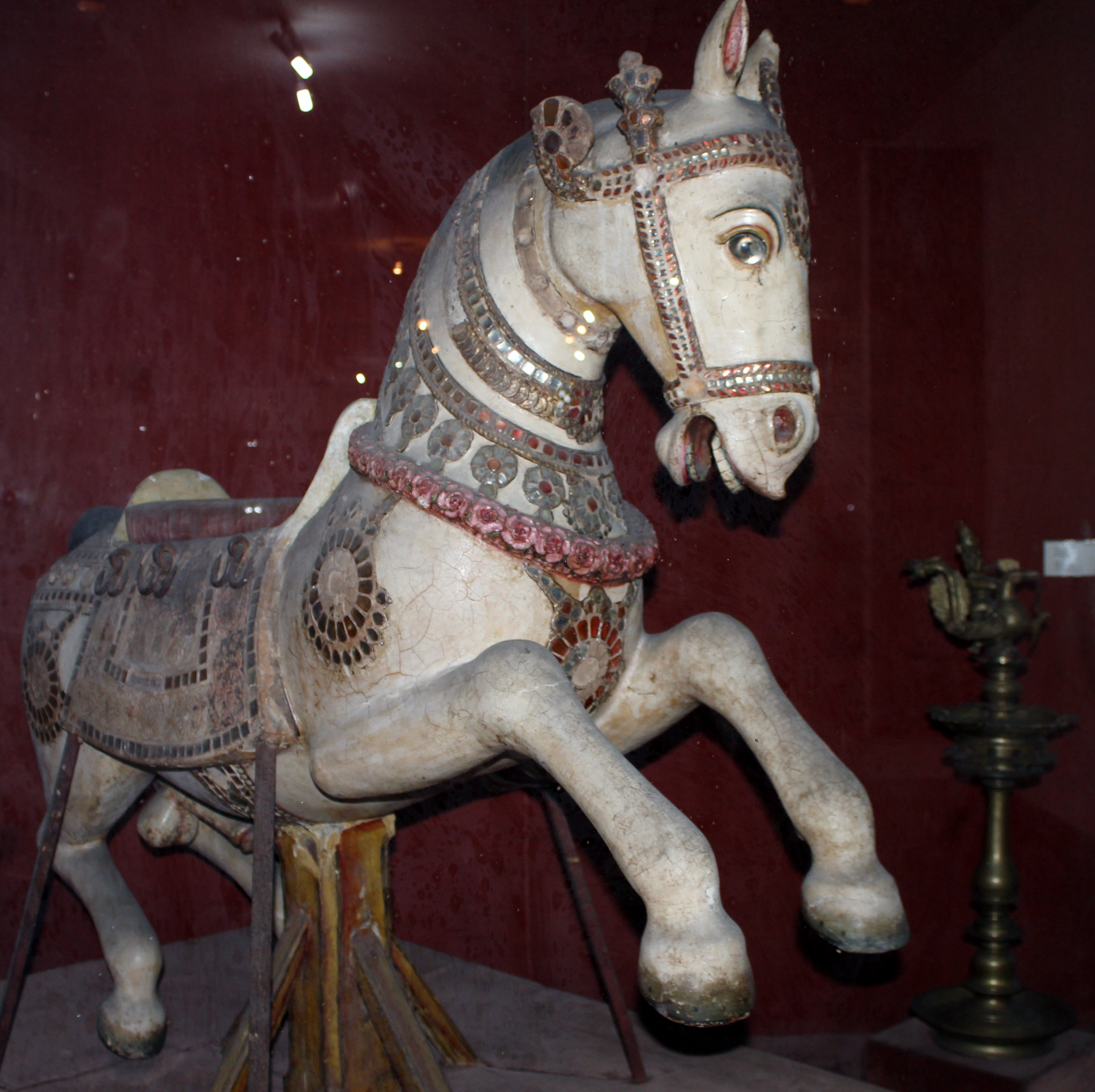

== Material and techniques ==
There is a great diversity of wood work and its techniques in Indian art. It is possible that a grammar of decorative art might be written from the study of wood carving alone and there is a circumstantial fact that the wood and the stone carvers belong to one and same caste. This may be accepted as an additional evidence in favour of gradual production of the one form the other and that at not very ancient date. There are various techniques by which the 'Wood' has been ornamented in several specific ways such as by carving, inlaying, veneering, lacquering, etc. The art of wood carving have been greatly influenced by the grain of the timber employed, that is possible with type of woods such as teak, red wood, walnut and low relief of Sheesham and Deodar the incised design of ebony. The intricate and the ornamental details of the Sandal and the barbaric boldness of Rohira, Sal and Babul and other coarse grained and hard woods.

India has a range of woods and each with a particular property of grain and strength. The skillful wood-workers have evolved styles and items depending on the quality of available wood and their craftsmanship, creating an wide range in wood products of all kinds. In Tamil Nadu, Virdunagar was once a traditional centre, Devakottai and Karaikudi are known to make traditional wooden panels in different sizes and Nagercoil and Suchindram have traditional carvers who make religious figures. Wood carvings are valued for the type of wood used in them, like rosewood for its faint perfume like rose water and ebony-black colour. Madurai is famed for rose wood carving marked by its bold style and detailed work. Tirupati area of Andhara pradesh has red sandal wood known as 'Raktachandan' which is blood coloured Sandal wood with coppery glow. Sandal wood from Karnataka is also known for its intrinsic quality and carving possibility. This region is inhabited by many talented wood carvers .

The technique type of carving are in the round, in relief, chip, incised and piercing. In the first the object is totally detached from main wood background such as 3D form of a human and animal figure. In relief, the figure etched and raised on the background wood, which can be high or low relief. Chip consist of evolving designs by chipping the wood used mostly in ornamental and decorative work. Incised is done without ground work mostly put out flowers and creeper motifs. Pierced is for effective ornamentation in which the wood is completely cut away leaving just the design that calls for extra scale. Karnataka is also famous for Rosewood artefacts, some of the best specimen of wood work is provided by the mighty pyramidal gateway of temple. An extension of this covers Temple chariots or Rathas, as they are called. The one in which the deity is carried is called Agami and is the most heavily ornamented with numerous sculptures such as flying angels, horsemen, elephant, eagle, swan, tigers etc. Another style of ornamentation is painting and inlay, often with precious metals like silver and gold.

== See also ==
- National Museum, New Delhi
- Ivory Carved Dashavtar
- Ivory carved tusk depicting Buddha life stories
- Jade Collection in National Museum
