= Jade Collection of the National Museum, New Delhi =

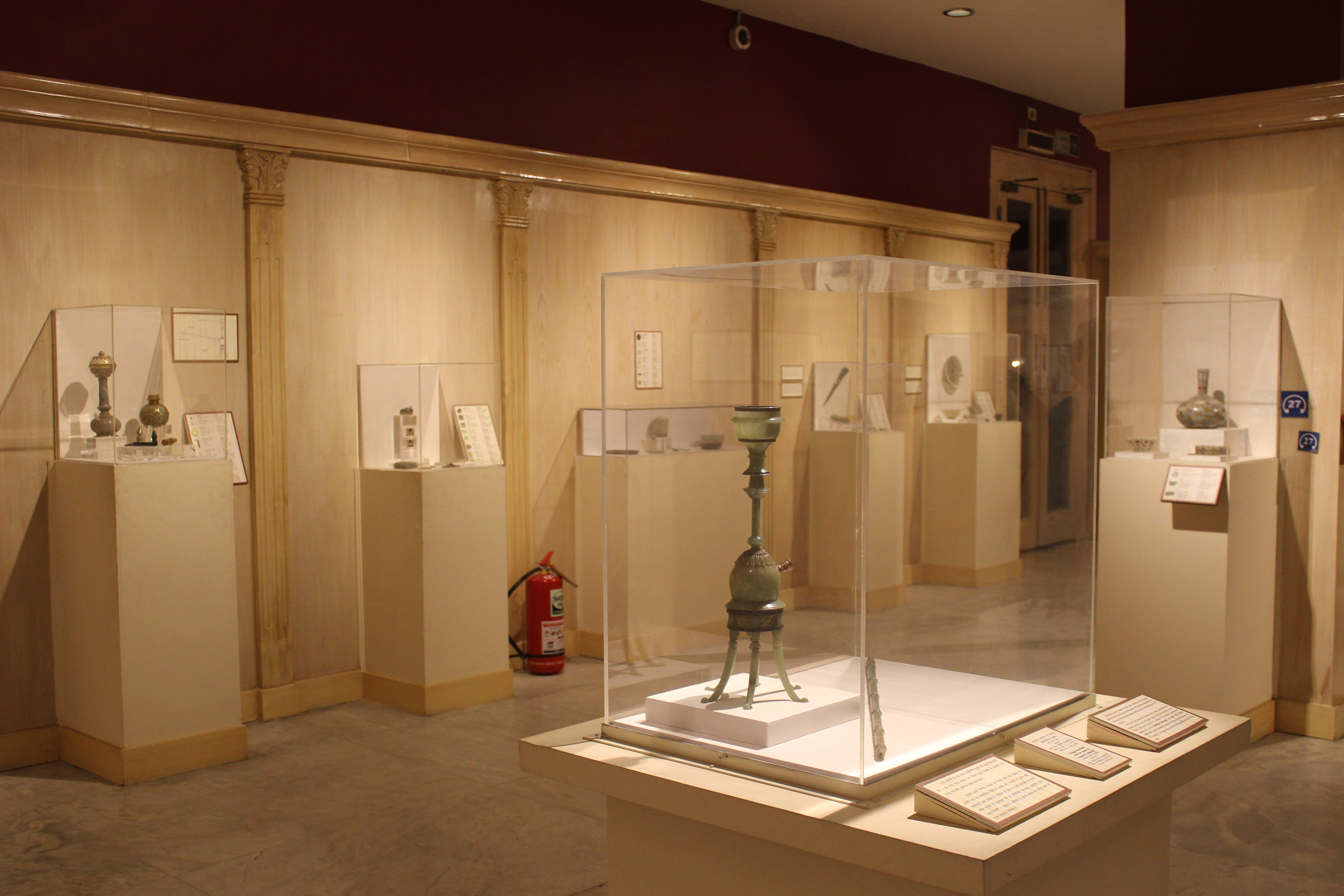
Jade collection at the National Museum, New Delhi, India.

The National Museum in New Delhi, India, has two galleries of decorative arts with a large collection of Mughal jade carvings forming a display for its Jade Collection.

== Mughal jade ==
Mughal jades, apart from contemporary architectural embellishment, was the primary form of sculptural expression in northern India during the 17th to 19th centuries. The museum has several immaculately carved jade artefacts studded with jewels. Fashioning jade to exquisite art-forms is a highly skilled but difficult and slow process. It is not carved but abraded with the help of several abrasives harder than jade. Finished jade objects were often damascened with gold or silver, enamelled or studded with jewels, not only for external beauty but also to grant them royal status.

Decorative elements and design used in Mughal architecture in stone and marble were beautifully used in jade. Jade formed an important material with which small objects like thumb rings, wine cups, plates, trays, boxes, huqqa bowls, dagger and sword hilts and the like were fashioned and decoratively enriched with various designs.

The Mughals referred to jade by its Persian name Yashm. They had workshop and factories where these artistic objects were manufactured in a refined style and encouraged artists-craftsman and artisans to come to their courts to receive honours and grants. The imperial workshops were maintained as part of the emperor's household. Abul Fazal describes the imperial household containing "one hundred workshops, each resembling a city or rather a little kingdom". Abul Fazal further describes that administrative supervision of workshops was held by the "High Steward of the Imperial staff". For each variety of handicrafts there were separate departments which were not only supervised by master craftsman but sometimes the emperor himself. They had a rich literary tradition and during the course of the expansion of their rule they came in contact with different traditions of other people and places. This was aesthetically synthesized into collective culture.

== History ==
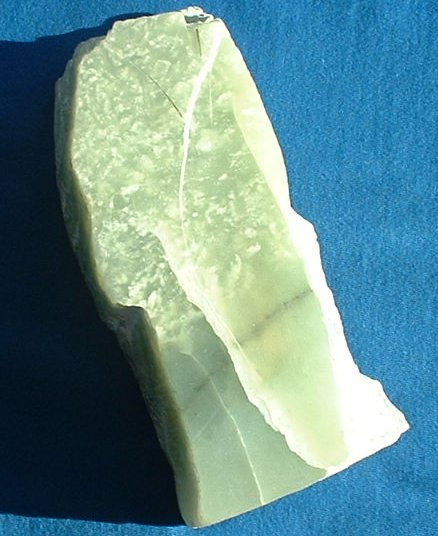
Unworked jade.

Jade is a gemstone with unique symbolic energy is known for its glossy surface, hardness and translucency. The term jade is commonly used to cover the nephrite, jadeite and chloromelanite groups of minerals, all of which are hard and attractively coloured. Bowenite is called False Jade or Jade look alike and is softer than true jade.

Jade comes in attractive colours ranging across dark green, pale green, white and yellow. This precious stone mainly comes from the rivers Karakash and Yarkand in Kwen-Lun range and Kashgar, in southern and northern China, besides Upper Myanmar and Tibet. A variety of jade jewellery and utility objects was used by Islamic rulers such Timurids, Ottomans of Turkey, Safavids of Persia and Mughals of India.

Jade became popular in India only from Akbar's time (16th century), although green jadite beads were found at Mohen-jo-daor and Hiuen-Tsang's travel accounts also mention the use of jade in India. An English Sea Captain, Howkins, who visited Jahangir's court in 1613 found five hundred cups made of rubies, emeralds, jade and other semi-precious stones.

The choicest carved and jewel studded jade armoury, jewellery and luxury items have been arranged here, to reflect the richness of Jade carving tradition of India. A few Chinese artefacts on display are good examples of ritual implements and sculptures.

== Mughal artefacts ==
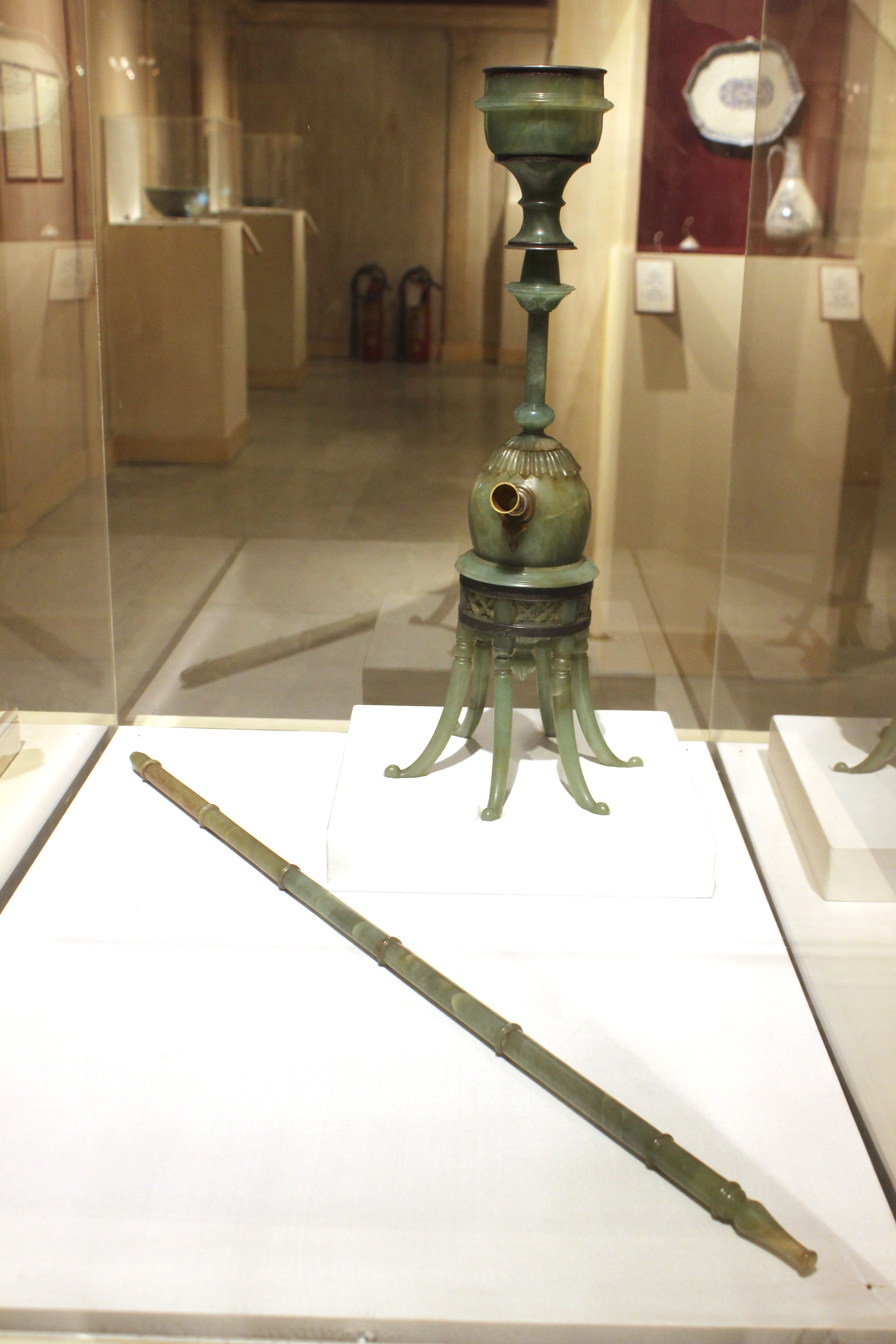
Emperor Jahangir's Inscribed Huqqa.

=== Huqqa of Emperor Jahangir ===
Tobacco smoking was introduced in India by the Portuguese during Emperor Akbar's period (1526–1605). In spite of Akbar's effort to ban smoking, it became popular during his son Jahangir's reign (1605–1628). The smoking of tobacco through a water base was believed to be less harmful. Huqqa or Hookah, a Persian word, usually has four parts; huqqa base is the water container; hollow stem, which is divided into two tubes to connect the huqqa base with chilam (tobacco container) and smoking pipe is placed on the neck of huqqa base. The third portion is the chilam with detachable lid to place it on top of one of the hallow tube. The last piece is a smoking tube, which is attached to the tip of the second tube. An interesting practice regarding the Muhnal (mouth-piece) is that it was detachable enabling each user to use his own muhnal.

Artisans were inspired by the popularity of Huqqa smoking and created many innovatively shaped huqqas – ovoid, spherical, curvaceous and bell shaped, or in the shape of mango, bird or doll. These huqqas were made of glass with gold and jewel studded decoration, silver enamelled or jade carved. The highly ornamental silver and jade huqqas are often found in many museums collection around the globe.

This inscribed jade narval shaped huqqa is a very rare piece. Calligraphy is inscribed on silver strip, which has been elegantly fixed on the chilam and pedestal. The upper edge and lower portion of chilam and upper portion of huqqa's pedestal is inscribed in Arabic and Persian in Nastaliq script.

The inscription reads:

قُلۡ هُوَ اللّٰه اَحَدٌ

اللّٰه الصَّمَدُ
لَمۡ یَلِدۡۙ وَ لَمۡ یُوۡلَدۡ
وَ لَمۡ یَکُنۡ لَّهّ کُفُوًا اَحَدٌ

Transliteration:
Bismillāhi -r-Raḥmāni -r-Raḥīm
1 Qul huwa Allāhu aḥad
2 Allahu -ṣ-ṣamad
3 Lam yalid wa lam yūlad

4 Wa lam yaku(n)l lahu kufuwan aḥad

The English translation thus reads:

Say: Allah, the One and Only; [1] Allah, the Eternal, Absolute; [2] He begetteth not, nor is He begotten; [3] And there is none comparable unto Him. [4]

The inscription on the top of the huqqa reads:

پادشاہ جہنگیر ۱۰۳۲ ھ

This roughly translates to:

"Emperor Jahangir, 1032 Hijri"

This Hijri year converts to 1626 AD.

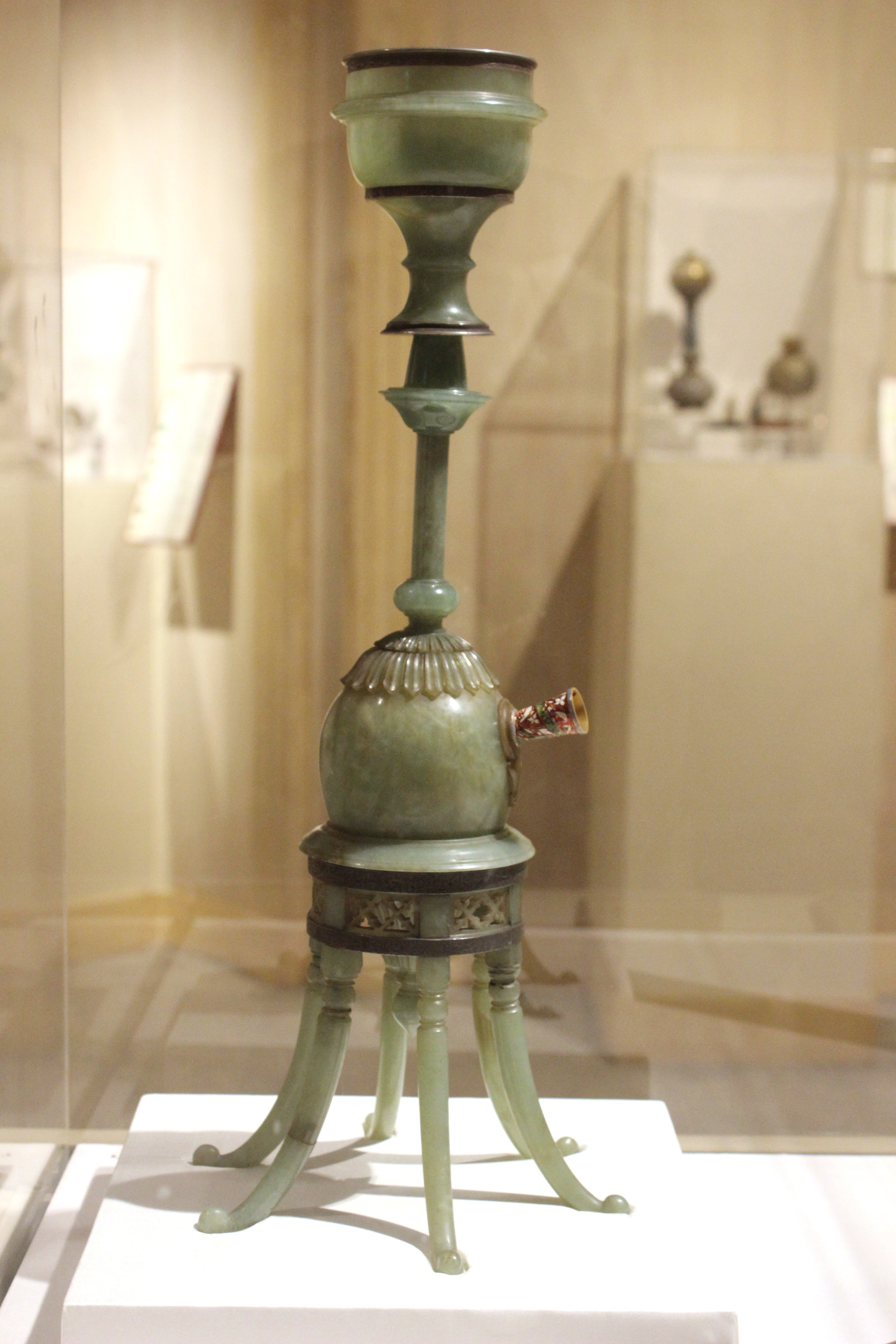
Closeup of Jahangir's Huqqa

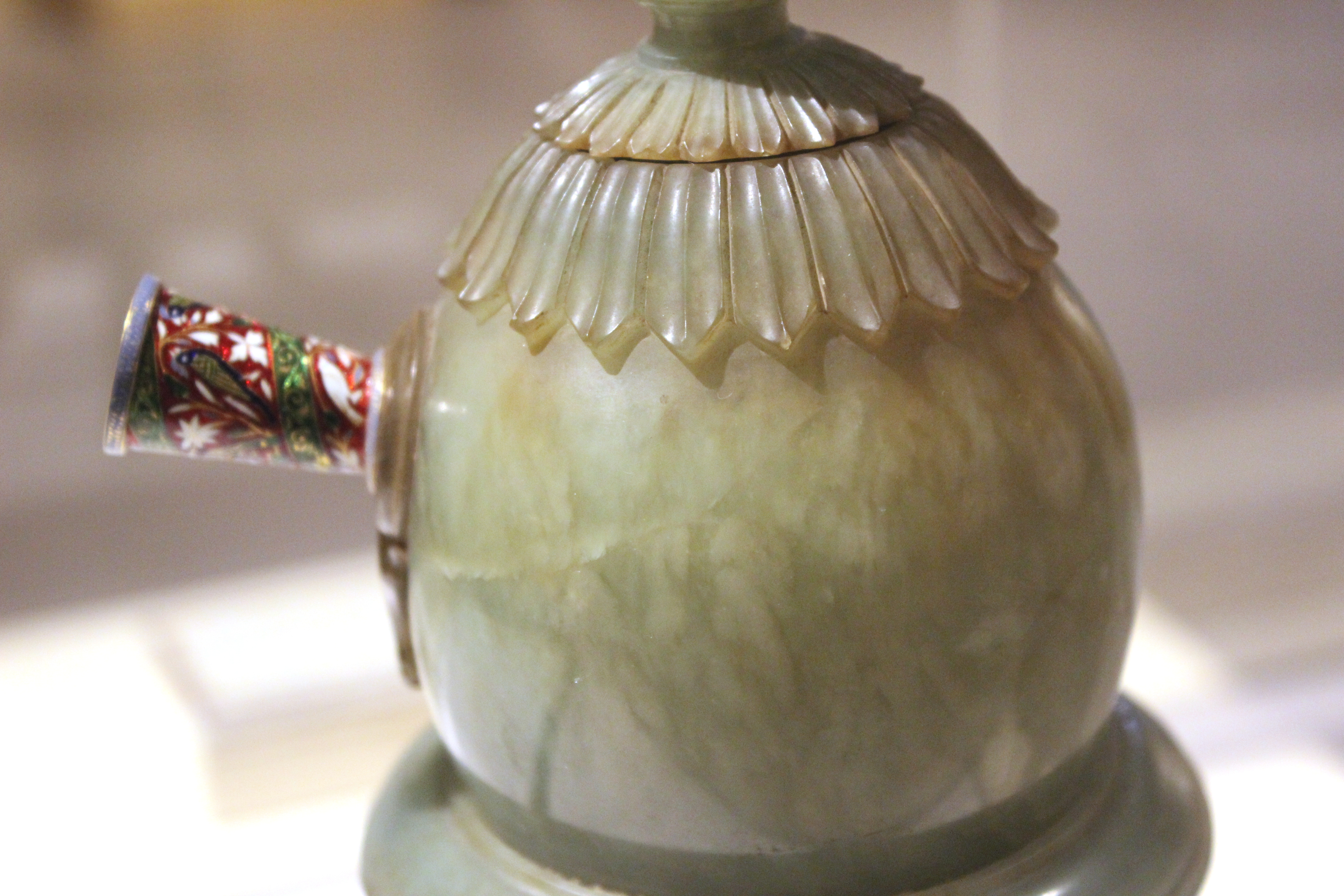
Floral pattern on the Huqqa

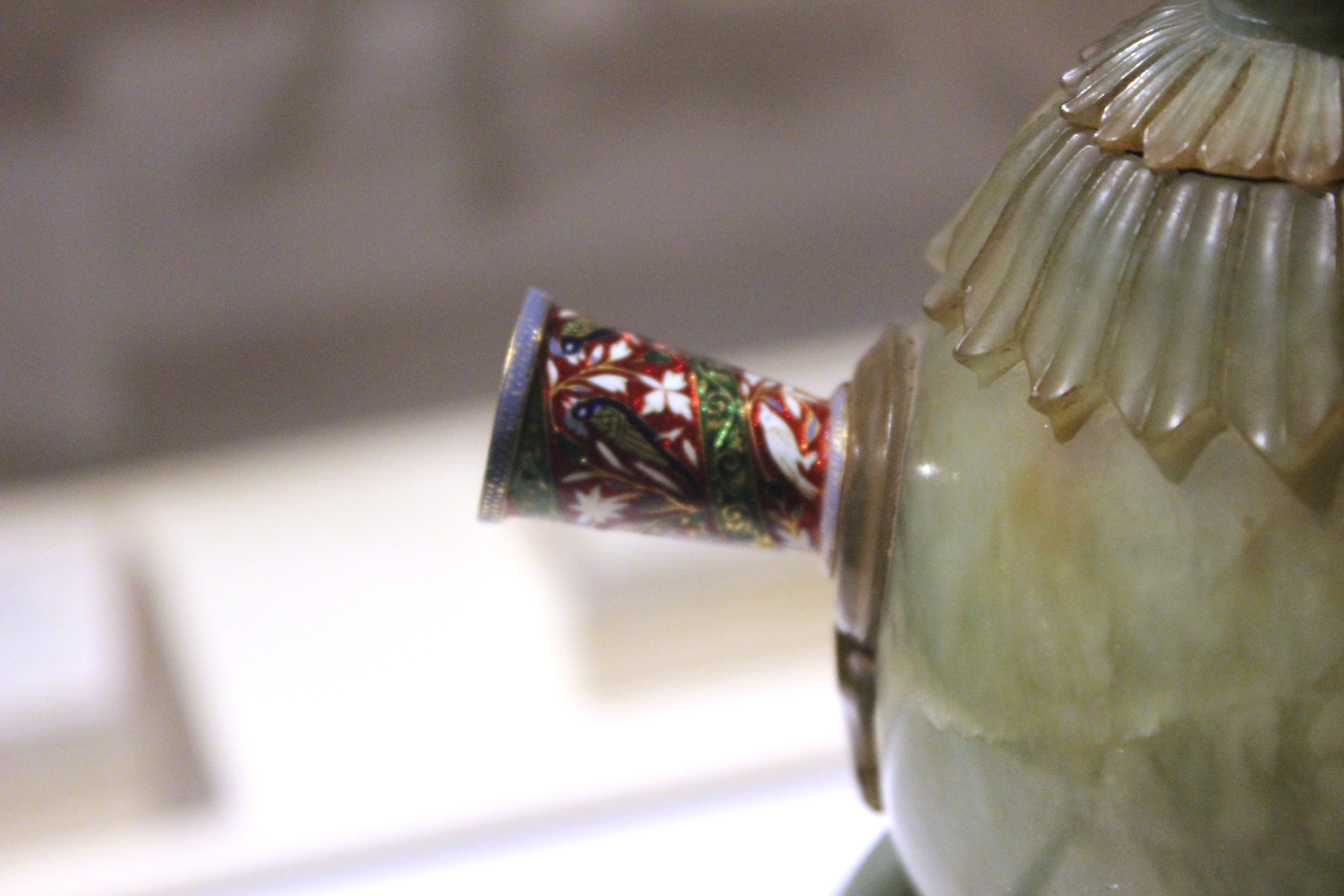
Pipe Fitter

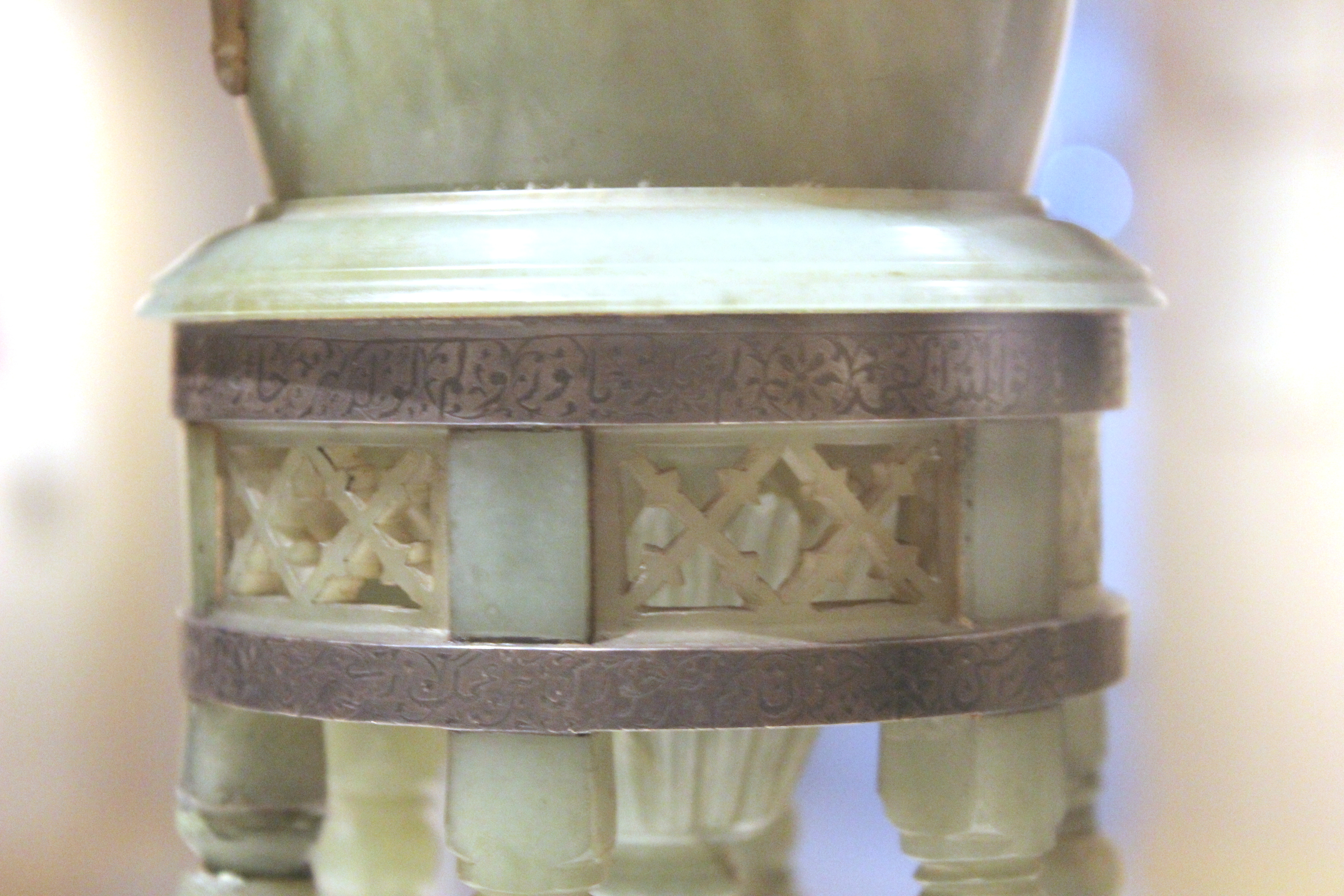
Inscription on the Huqqa

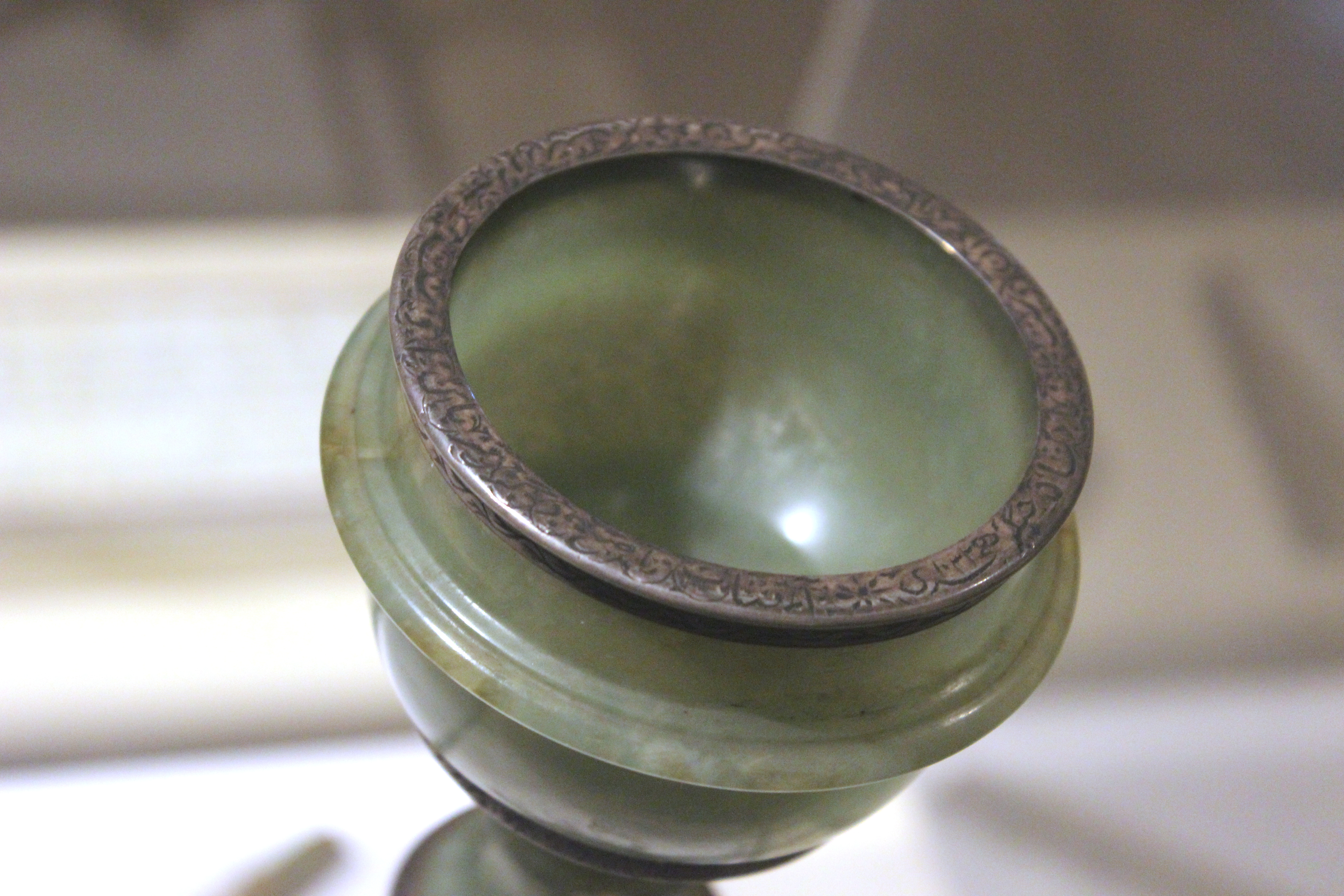
Inscription on the top of Huqqa

=== Surahi ===
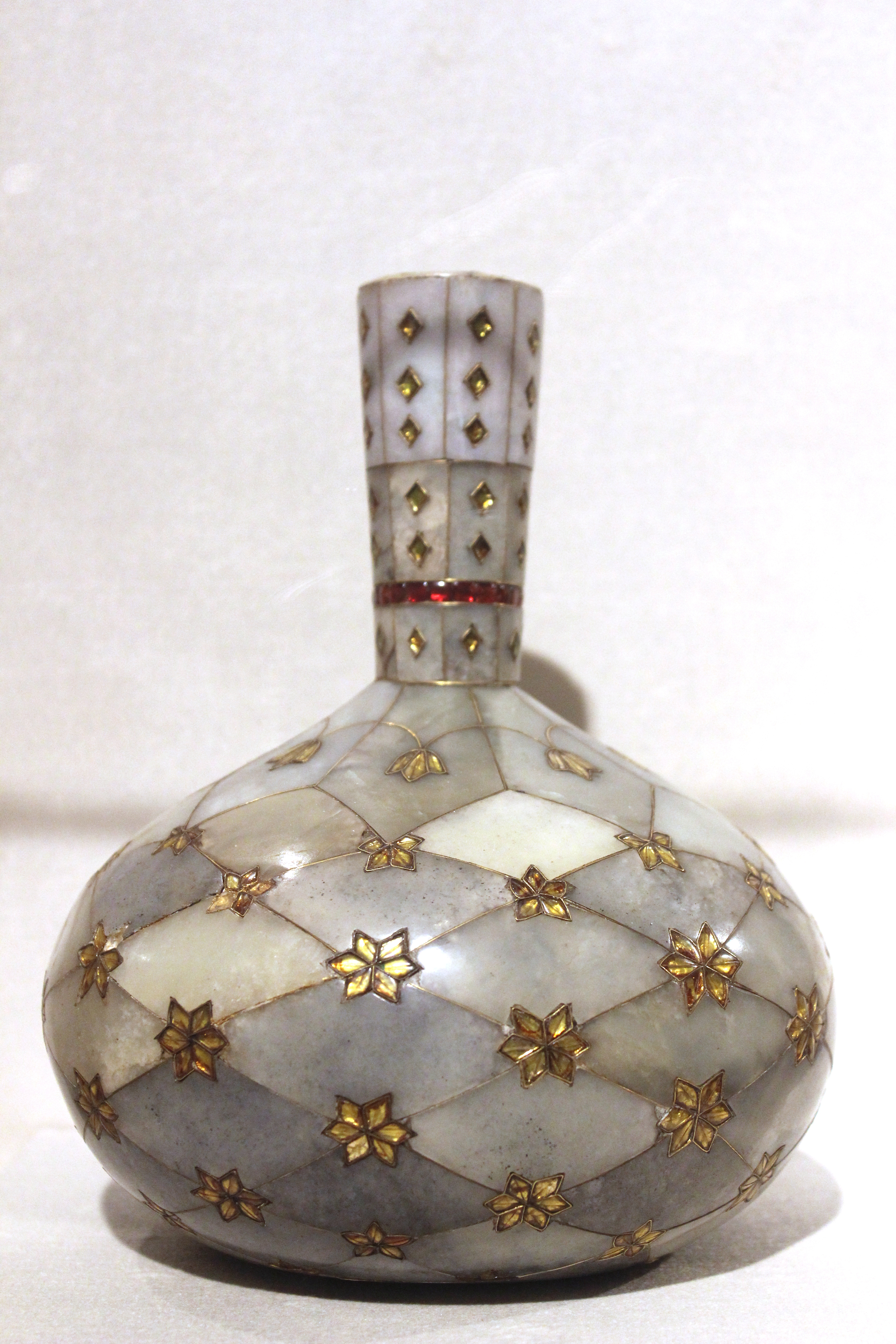
Jade surahi flask

The royal karkhanas (manufacturing workshops) established by the Islamic rulers were the main manufacturing centres for producing all objects which were required by royalty. Akbar and his successors continued and upgraded this system and under their personal supervision exquistive jewellery items, imaginative armoury articles and a variety of utilitarian artefacts were crafted. Immacutavely carved out of jade these artefacts are often studded with jewels like rubies, diamonds, emeralds and jade. These objects are great examples of the emperor's high taste and the skill of the artisans. Among various uttarian artefacts, the surahi (flask), which was used for keeping wine or water, is a rare example of jade carving. Many vessels are illustrated in the Persian and Indian miniature paintings of the seventeenth-eighteenth century.

With a globular body and long neck, this surahi is an outstanding example of jade carving. It is inlaid with diamond shaped jade pieces and decorated with gold wire. Each of the joints is beautifully decorated with six petal flower motifs, which have been worked with gold leaf covering and glass. The neck portion of surahi is made of small rectangular jade pieces on which row of diamond design has been worked out. A ring of red stones on the lower portion of neck enhanced the charm of the surahi.

=== Cup of Emperor Akbar Shah II ===
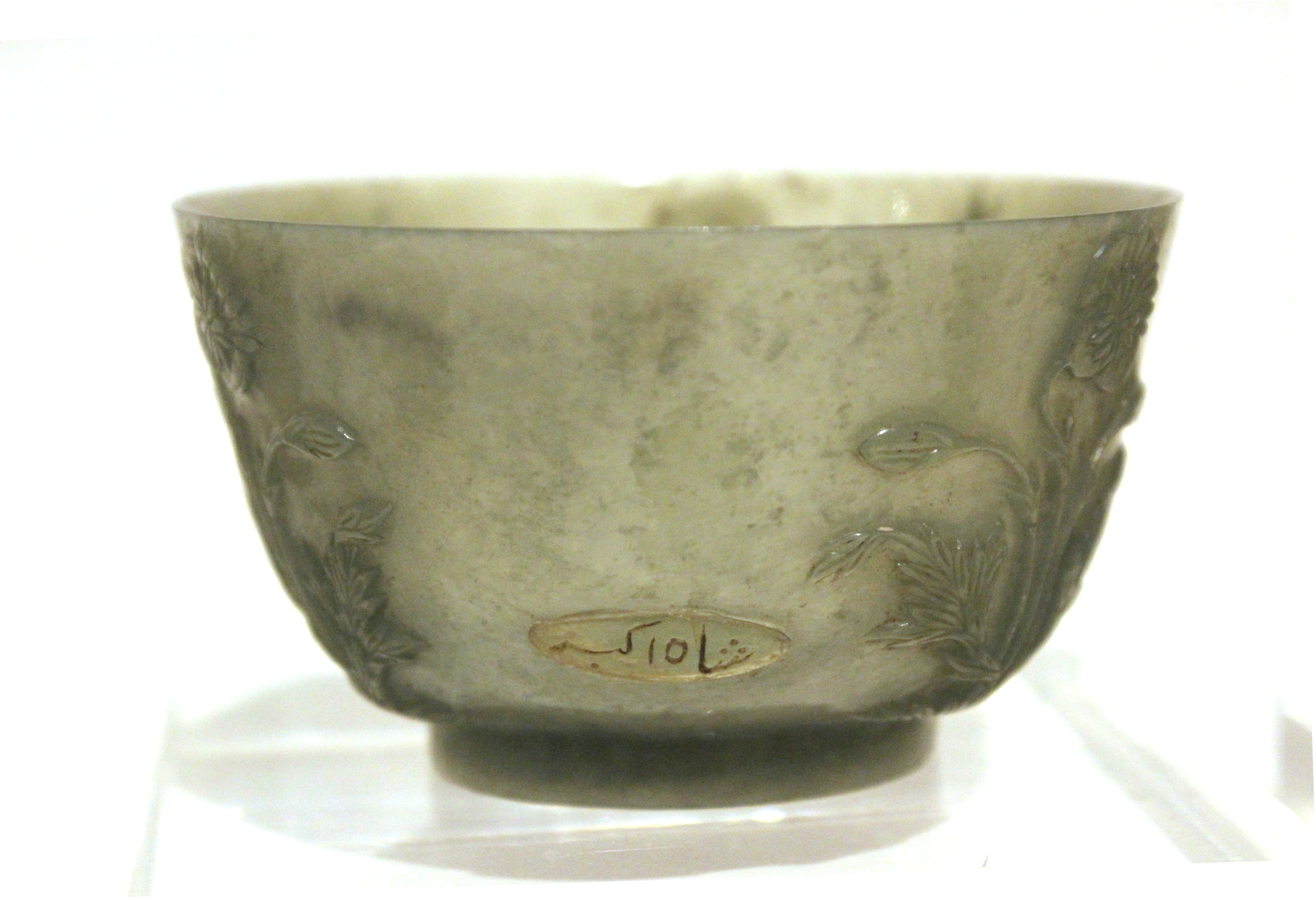
Jade bowl inscribed with Akbar II's name

Cups and vases made under supervision were immaculately carved out of jade and often studded with jewels. Among all the exquisite examples, the most unusual object displayed in the jade utility section is the cup, on which the name of the Mughal Emperor Akbar II Shah (1760–1837) is inscribed in Persian. The inscription reads 'Shah Akbar'. He was the second son of Shah Alam II and the father of Bahadur Shah Zafar II. Light green cups which can be seen in Mughal paintings which might be interpreted as being East Asian green celadon ware. However, no such celadons have yet been discovered in a Mughal context. Floral motifs were beautifully used in stylised and realistic manner. Some of the flowers identified as Iris and Narcissus. The many flowers on the plant are seen from different angles and in different stages of their blossoming.

=== Archer's rings ===
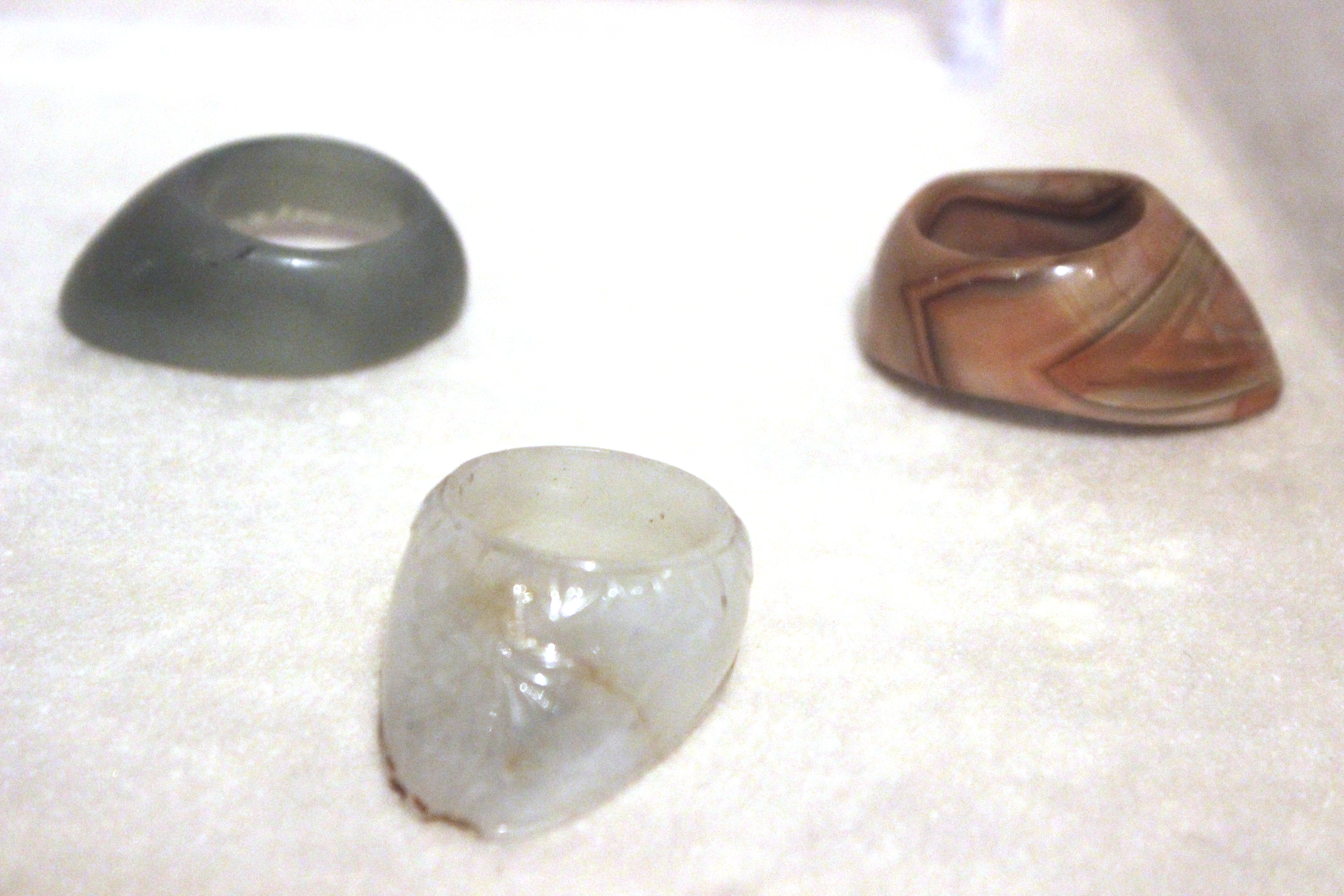
Archer's rings

Specially designed 'archer's ring' was worn by an archer in the thumb of the right or left hand at the time of archery. While pulling the string for shooting the arrow, it helped in safe guarding the thumb, so that the string of bow would not damage the fingers. It is made of whitish nephrite jade and dark green jade. It is adorned by floral motifs.

=== Other items ===
Other objects include studded plated, betel and spice boxes, cups, bowls, spoon, plaques, tumblers etc. All these artefacts help in understanding the artistic taste of patrons and craftsmanship of artisans prevalent during the 17–19th Century CE. An ornate jade armlet of 18th century is inlaid with ruby in the center and surrounded by emeralds. An 18th century jade cosmetic casket is in the shape of the mango with an enamelled silver lid. A plate of the 18th century is inlaid with precious stones and gold wires.

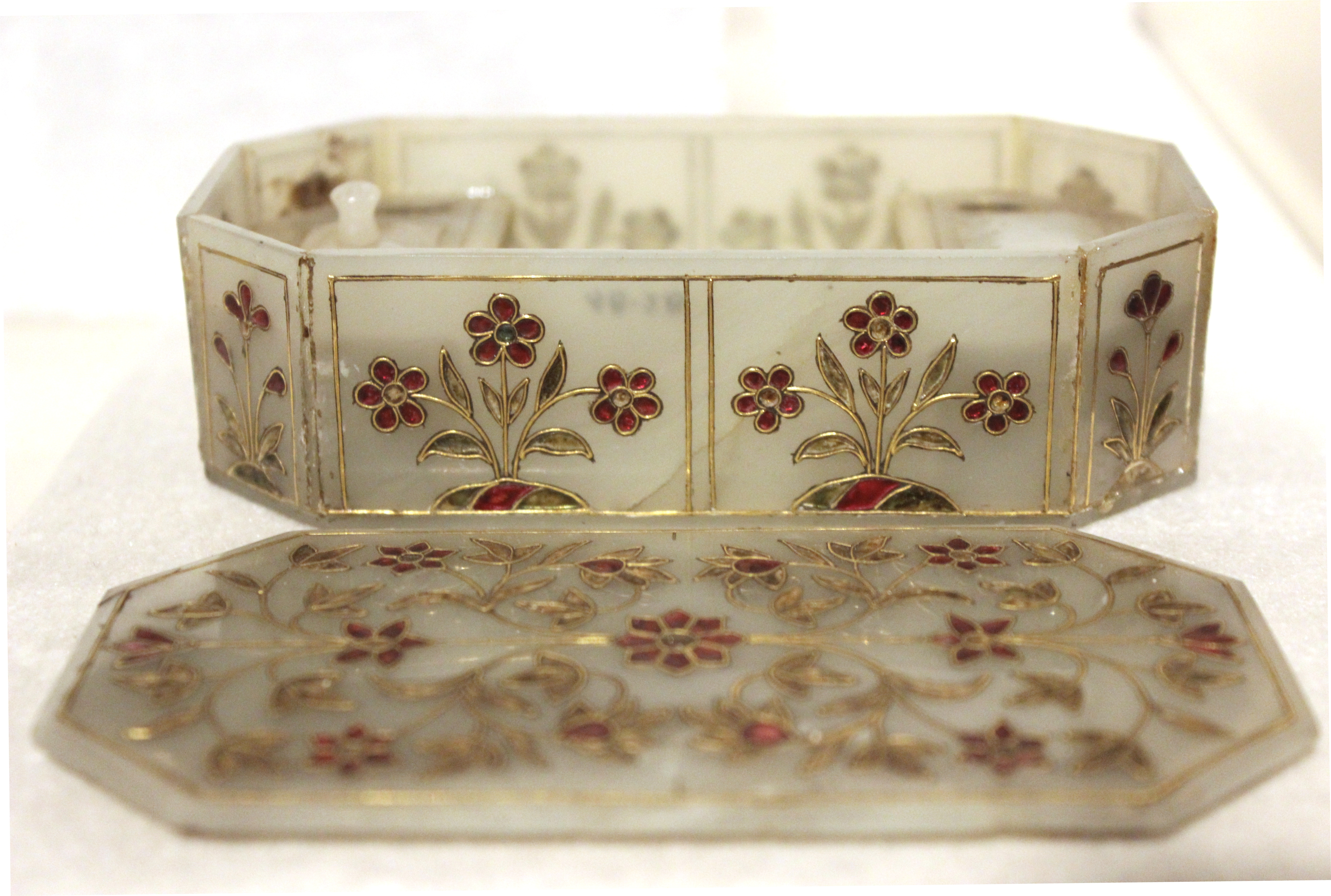
Spice box, Late Mughal period

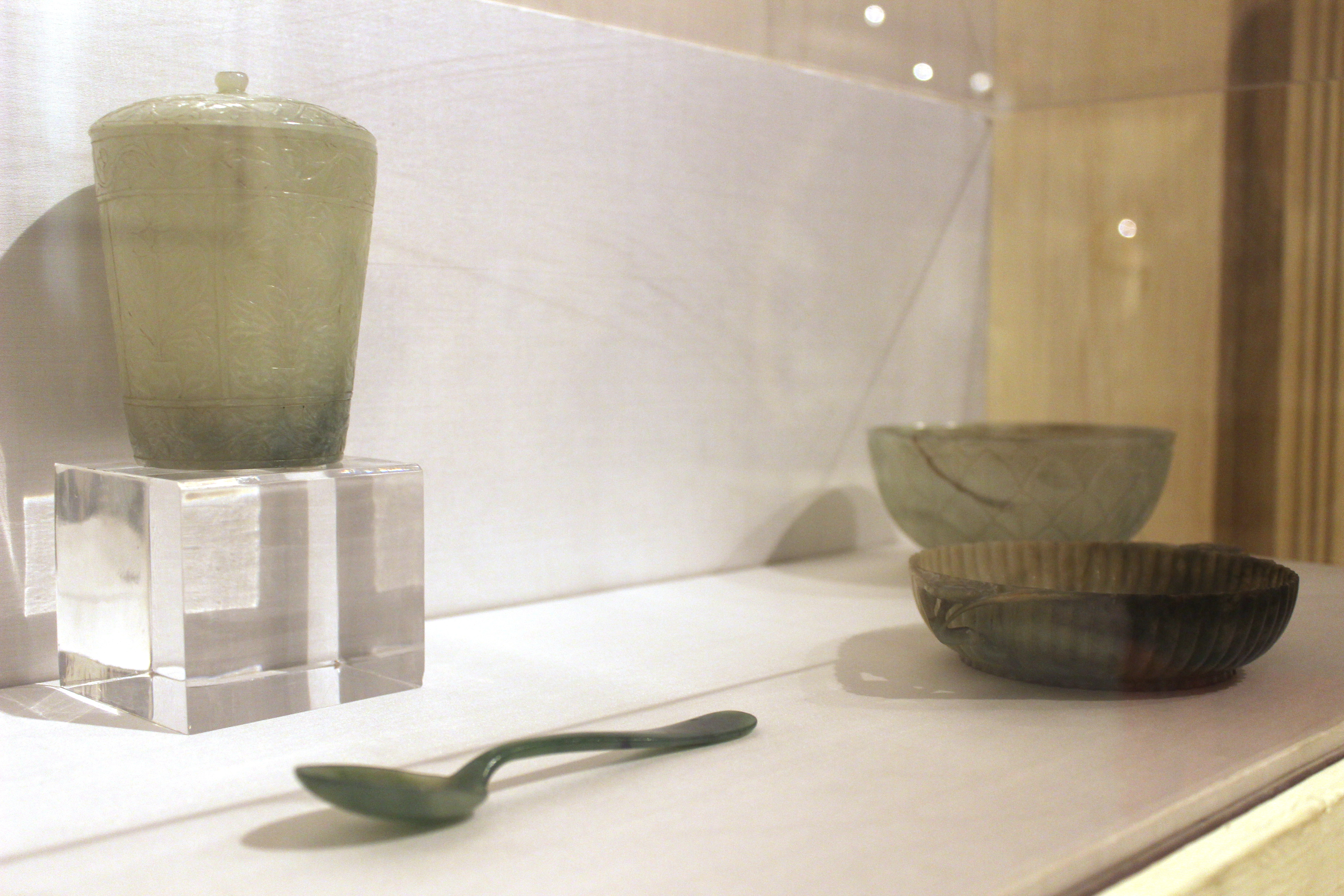
Items of Jade

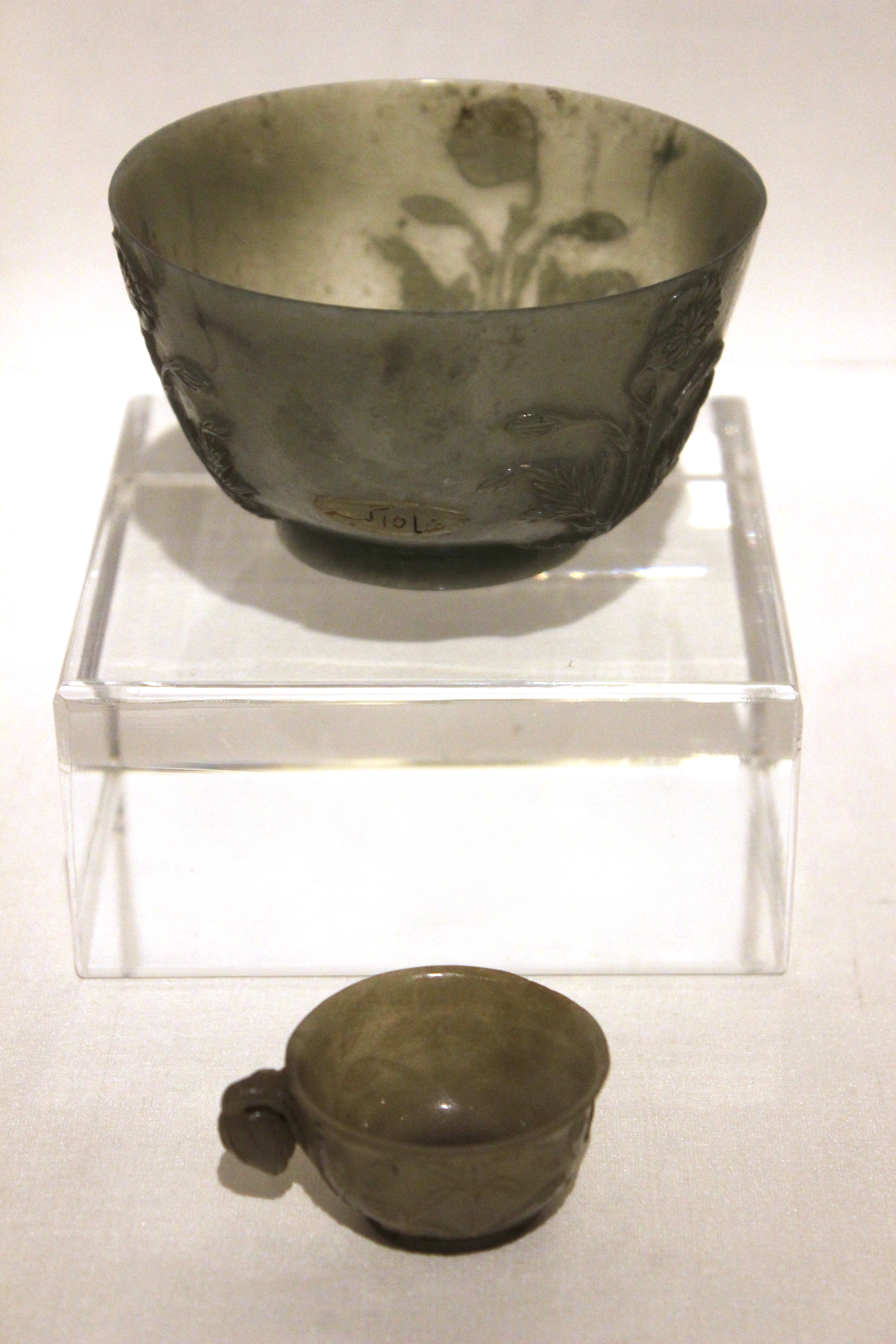
Different Use

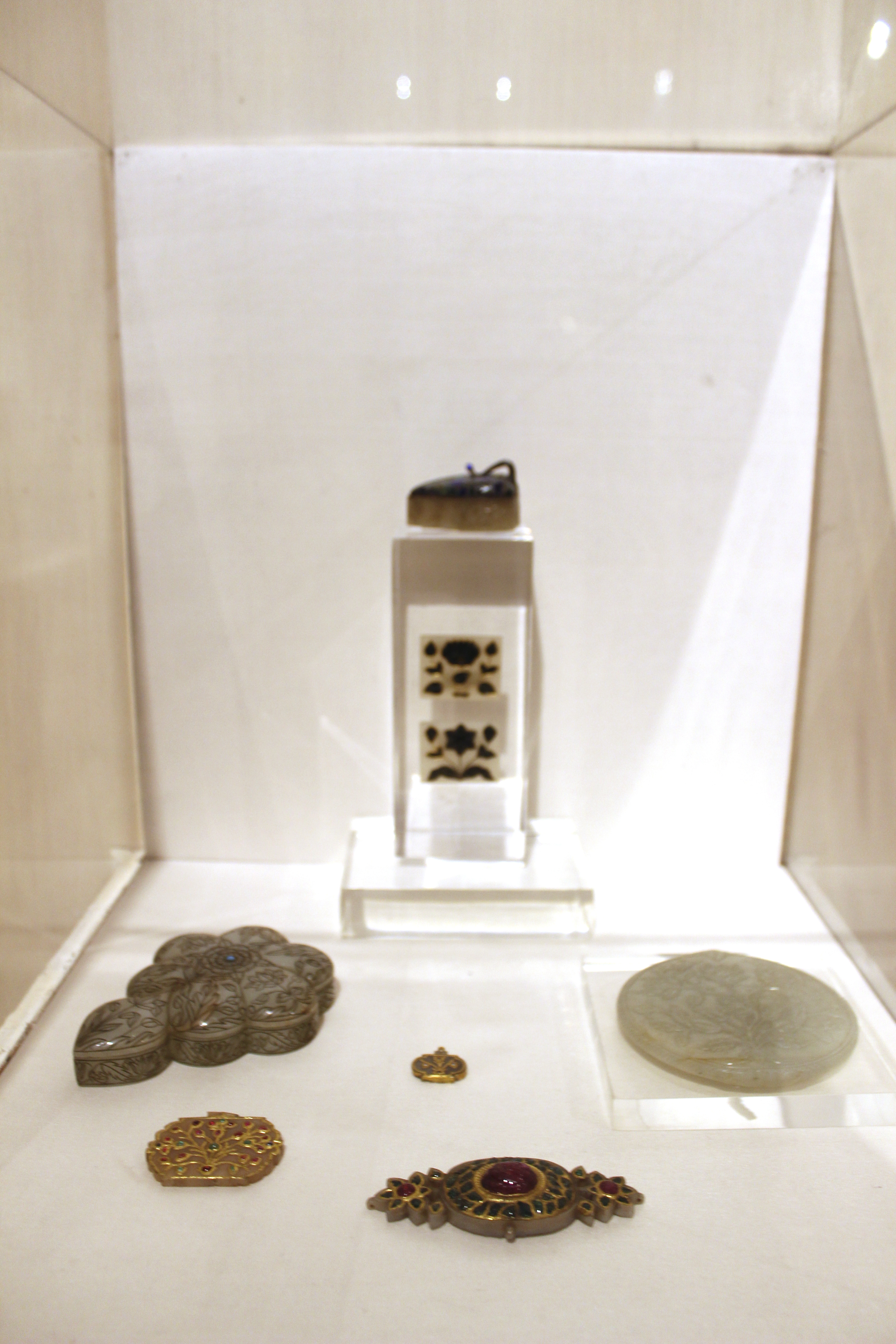
Jewellery items of jade displayed in the gallery

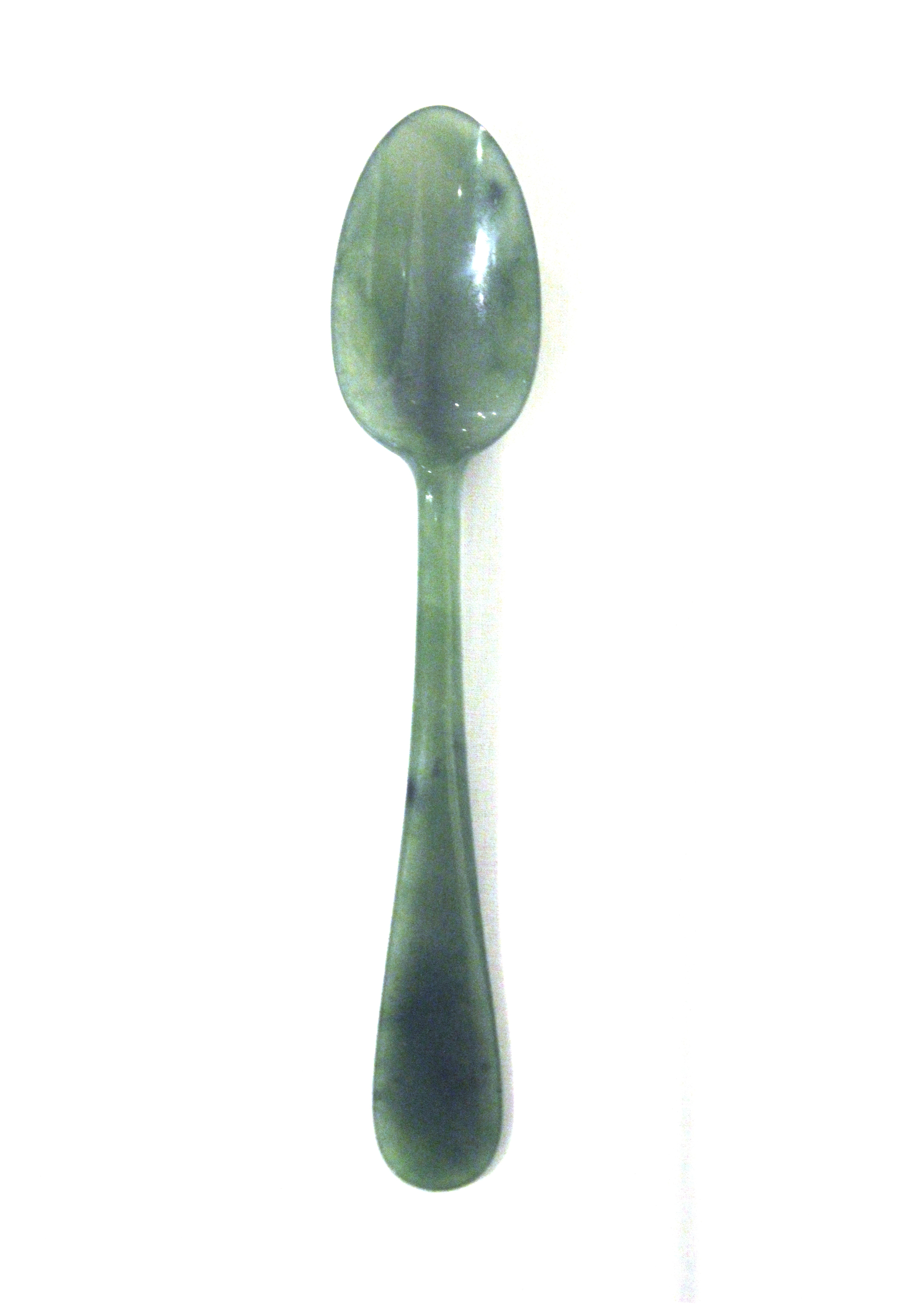
Spoon made in Jade

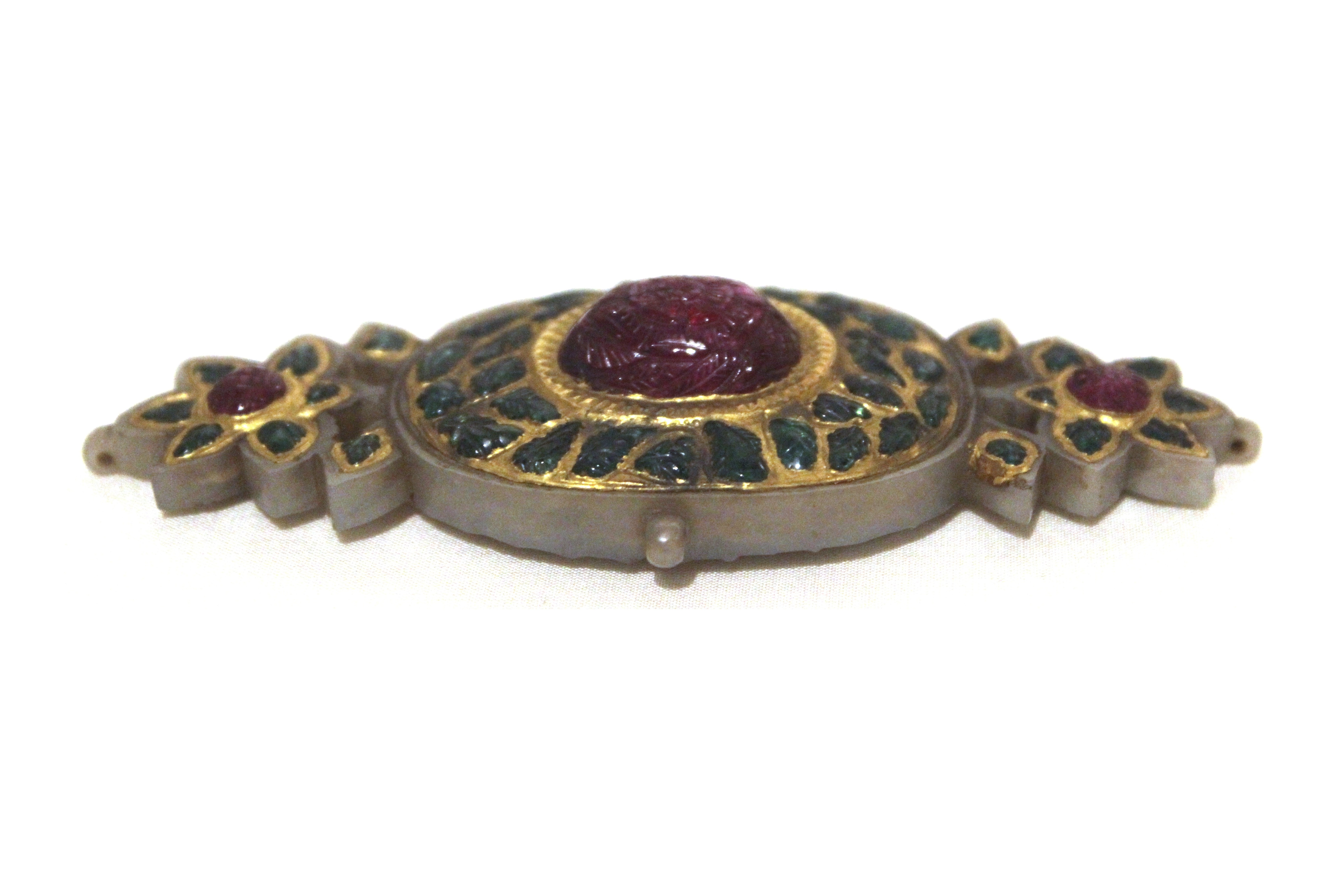
Ornate Jade Armlet

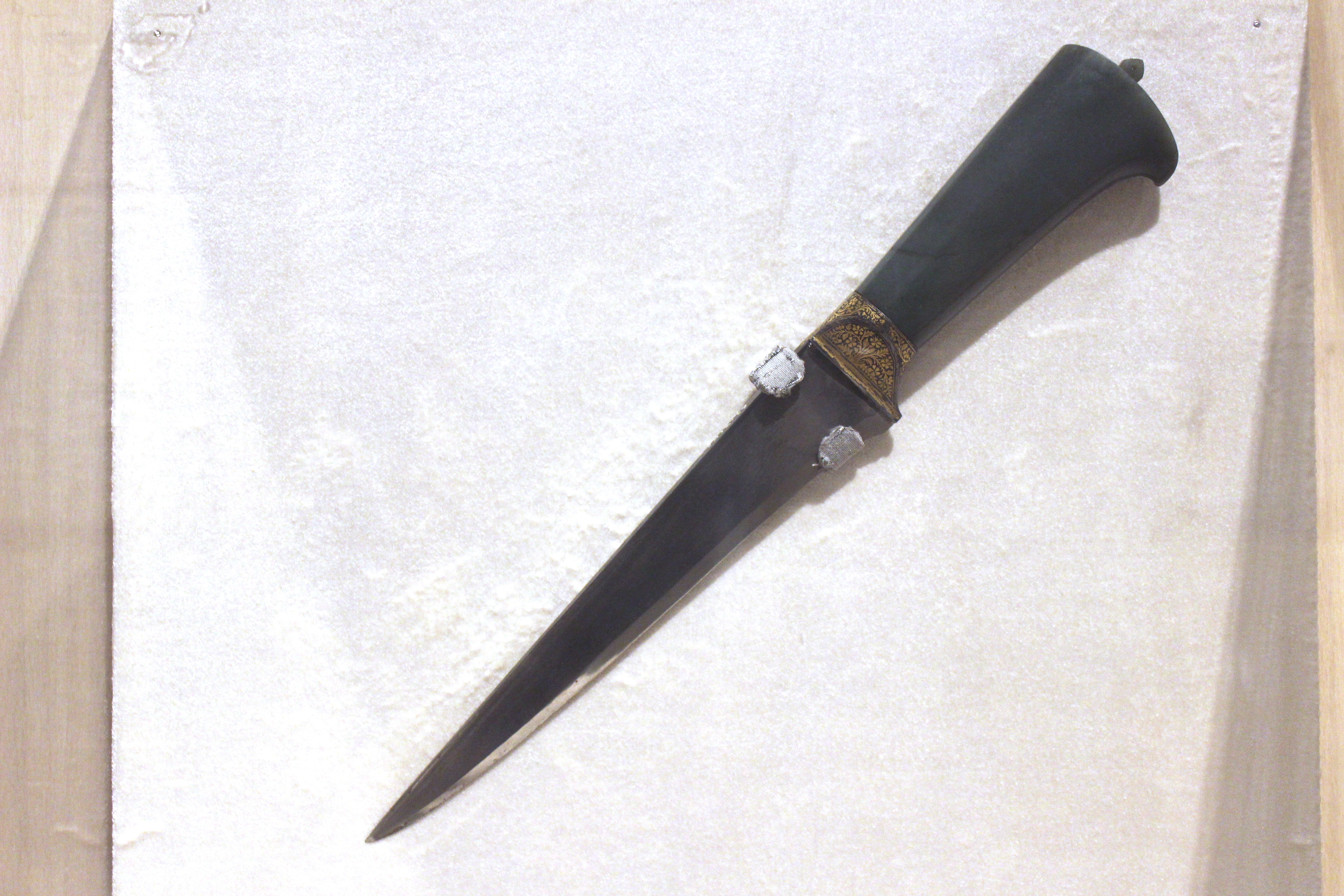
Jade handle with the dagger

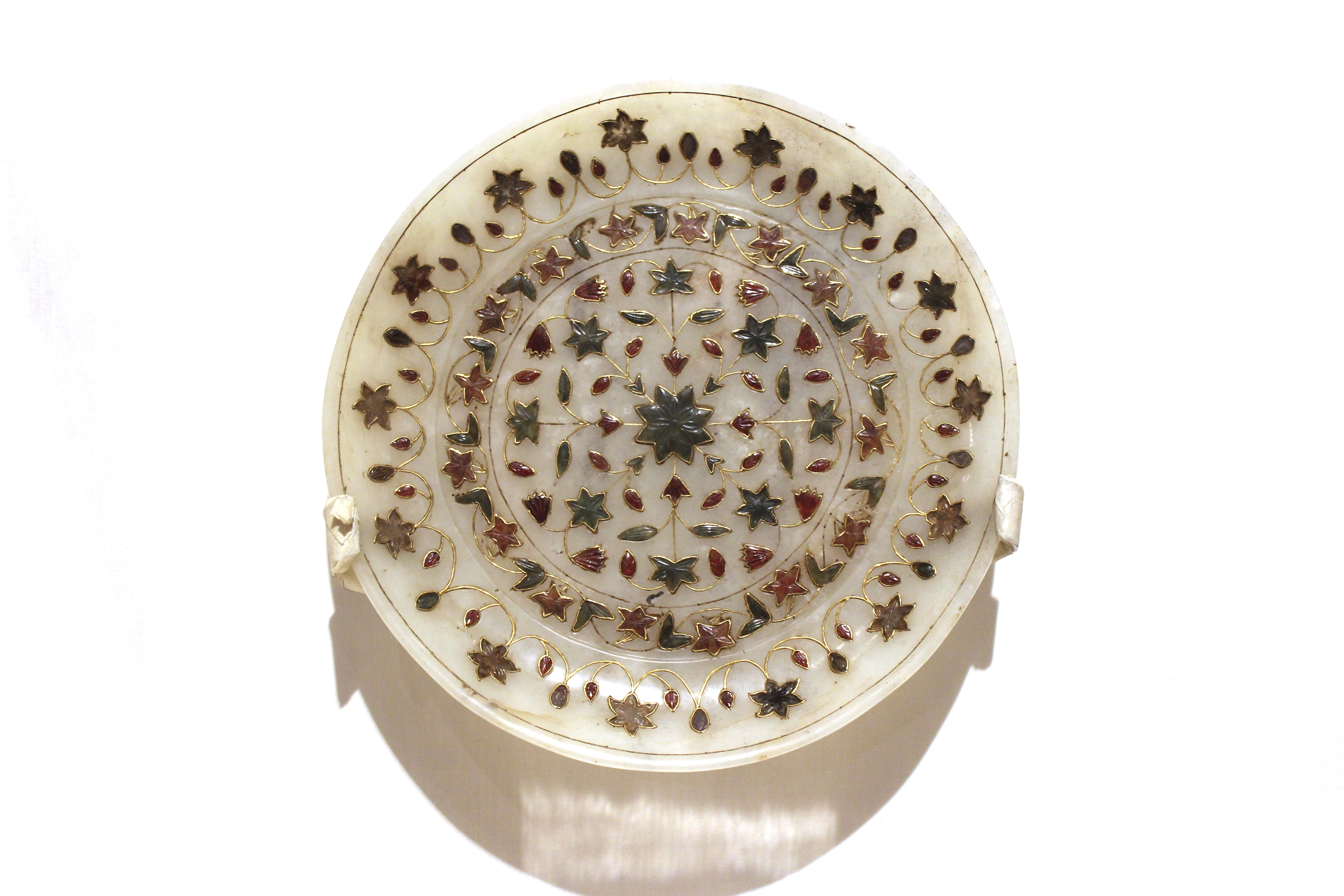
Jade Plate

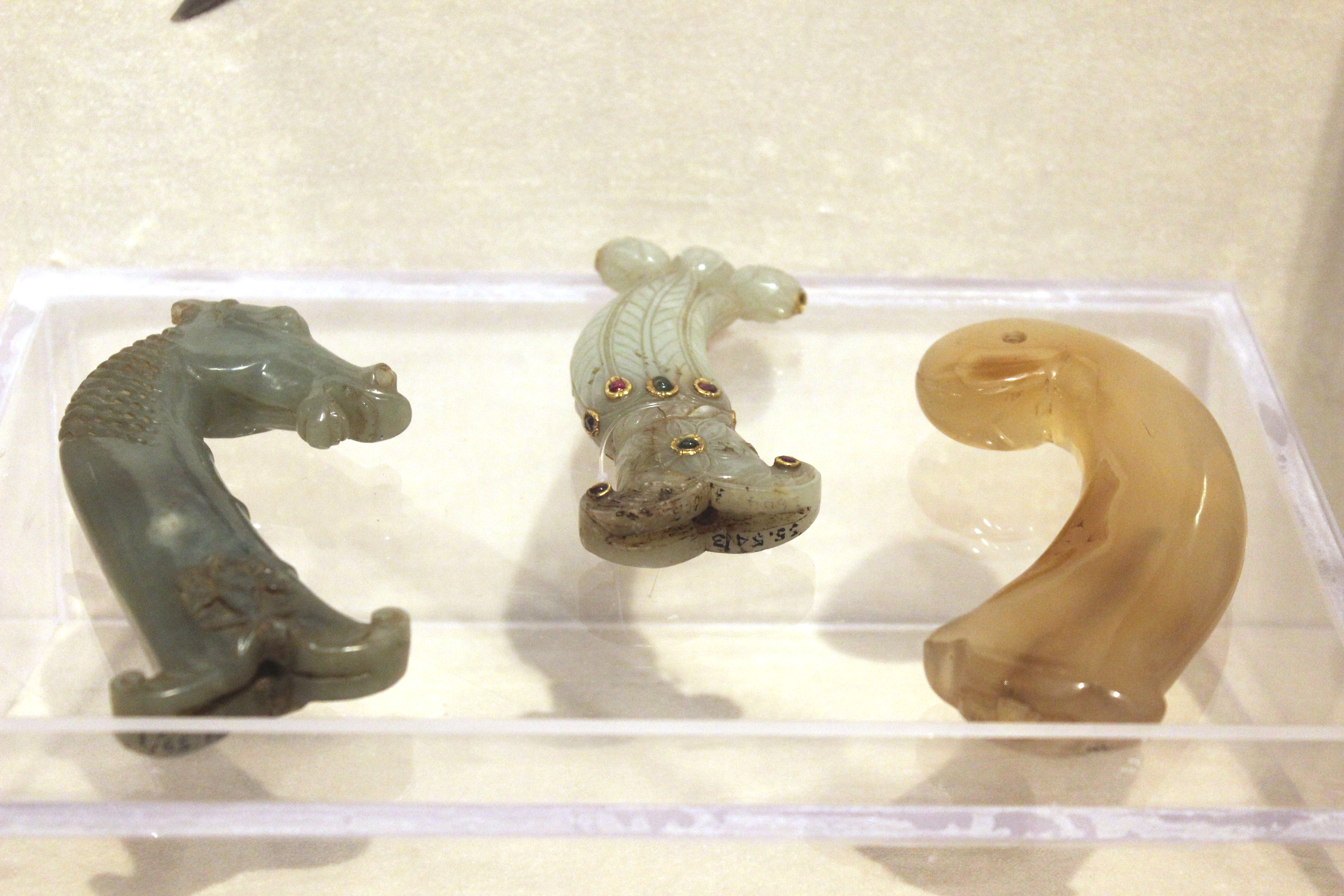
Different Handles of the Museum

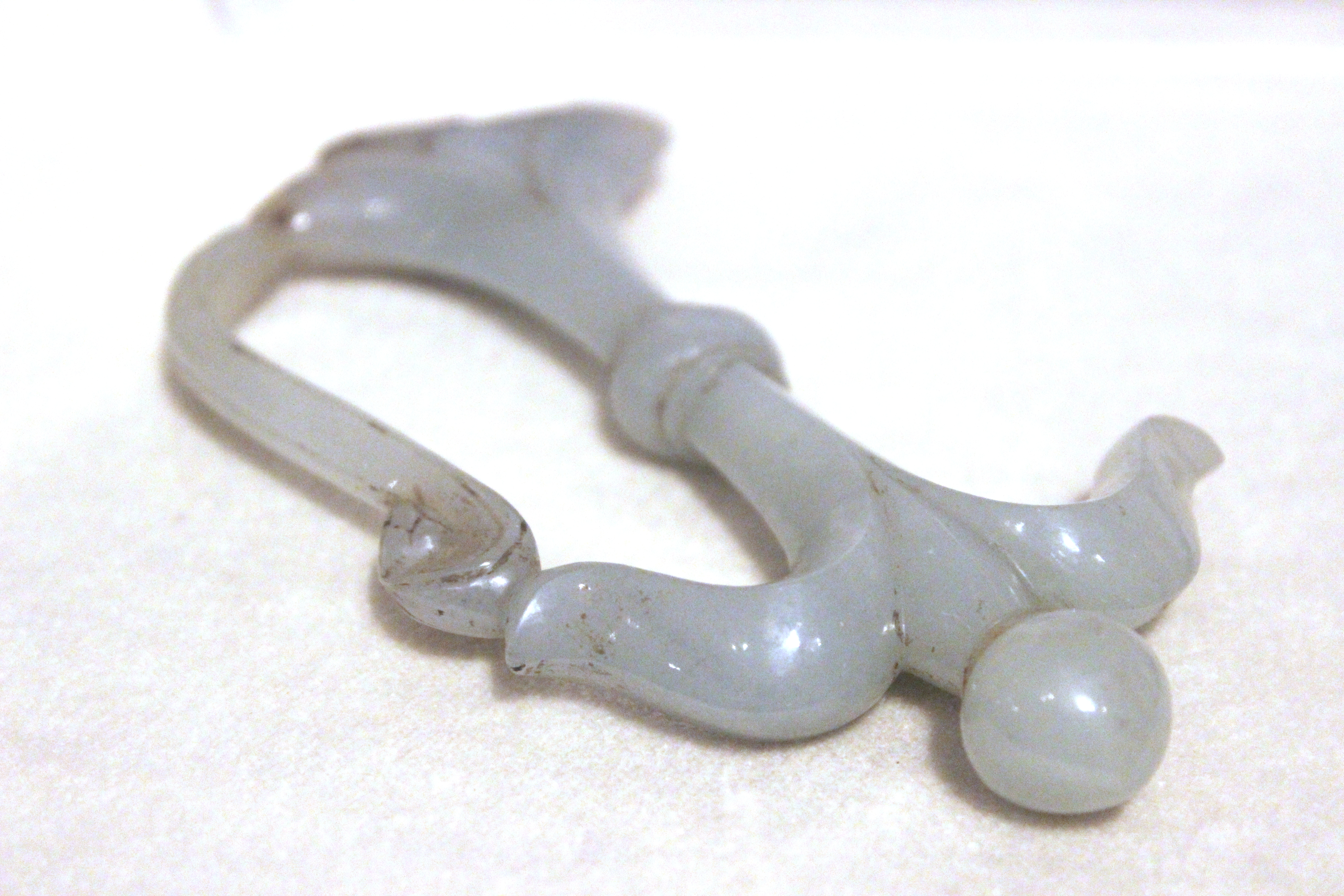
A Jade handle

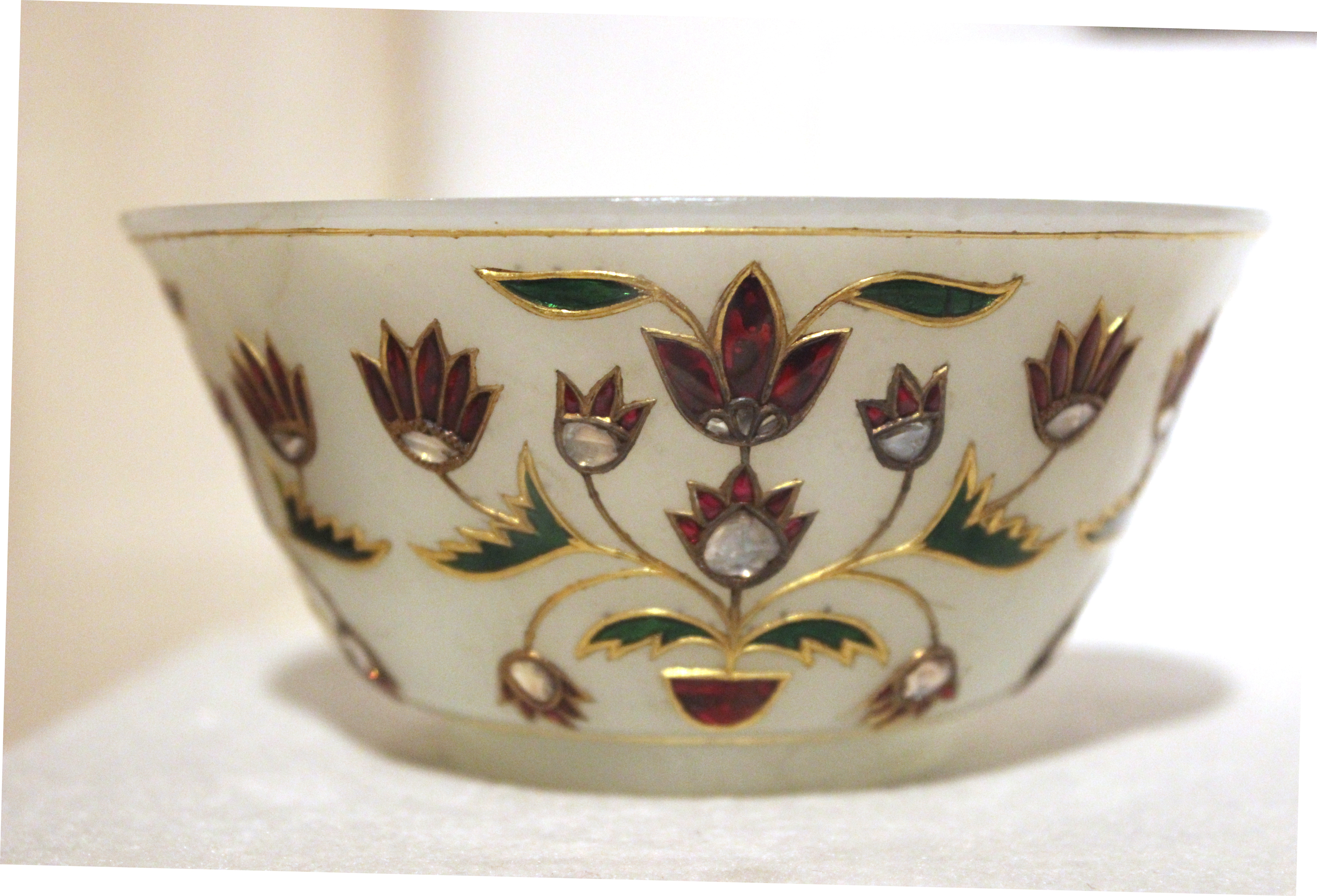
Jade Bowl inlaid with gold and diamonds

== Chinese artefacts ==
The Chinese are known for their love of jade, which stretches for over seven thousand years of constant innovation and creation of artefacts in jade. They attached many moral and philosophical values to it and admired its purity. The prominent pieces on display comes from the Ming Dynasty are characterized by strong graceful forms and simple ornamentations. The bi disc is an important one, which reminds of the funeral artefacts found in ancient Chinese tombs.

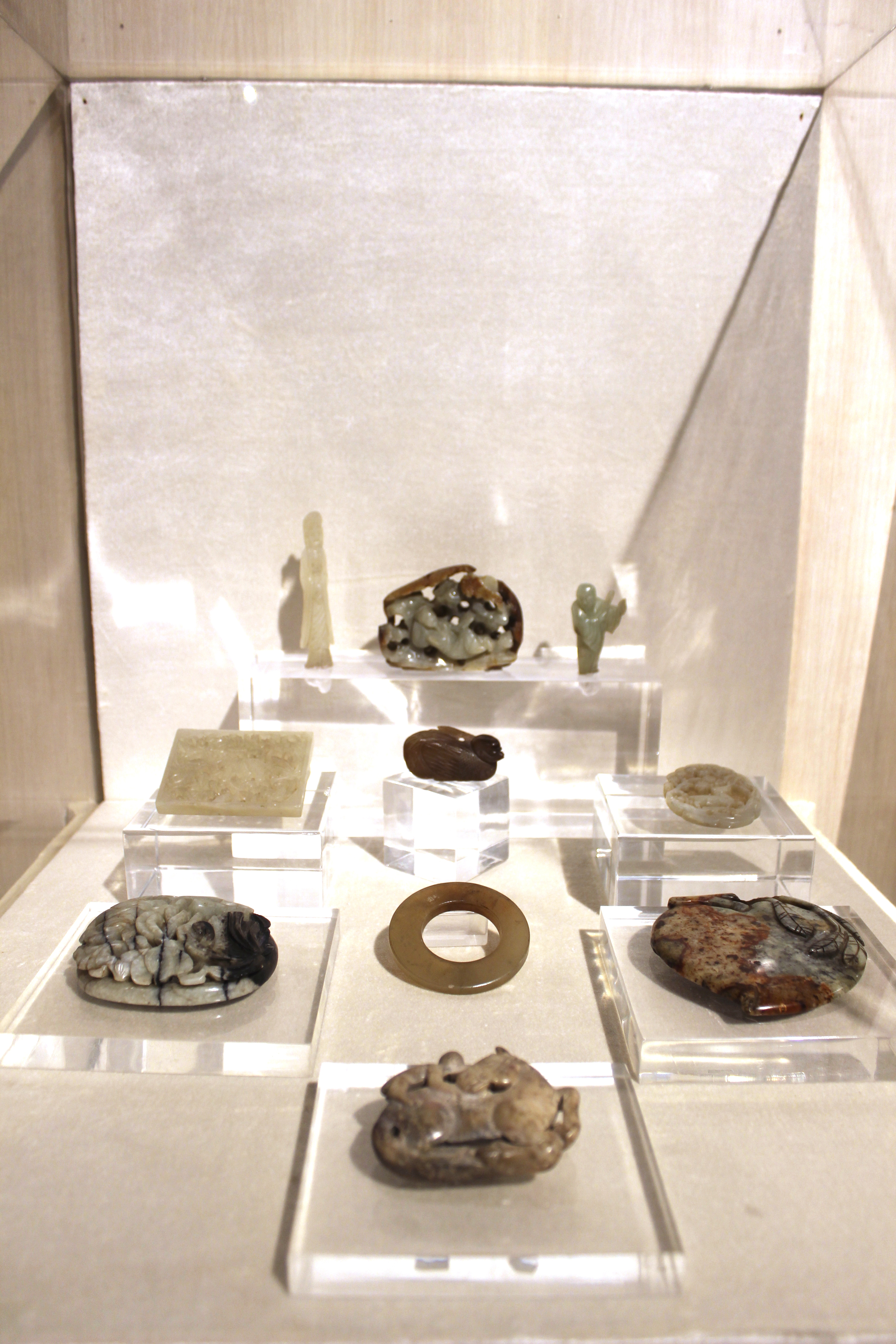
A look at the different Chinese Jade objects in the Gallery

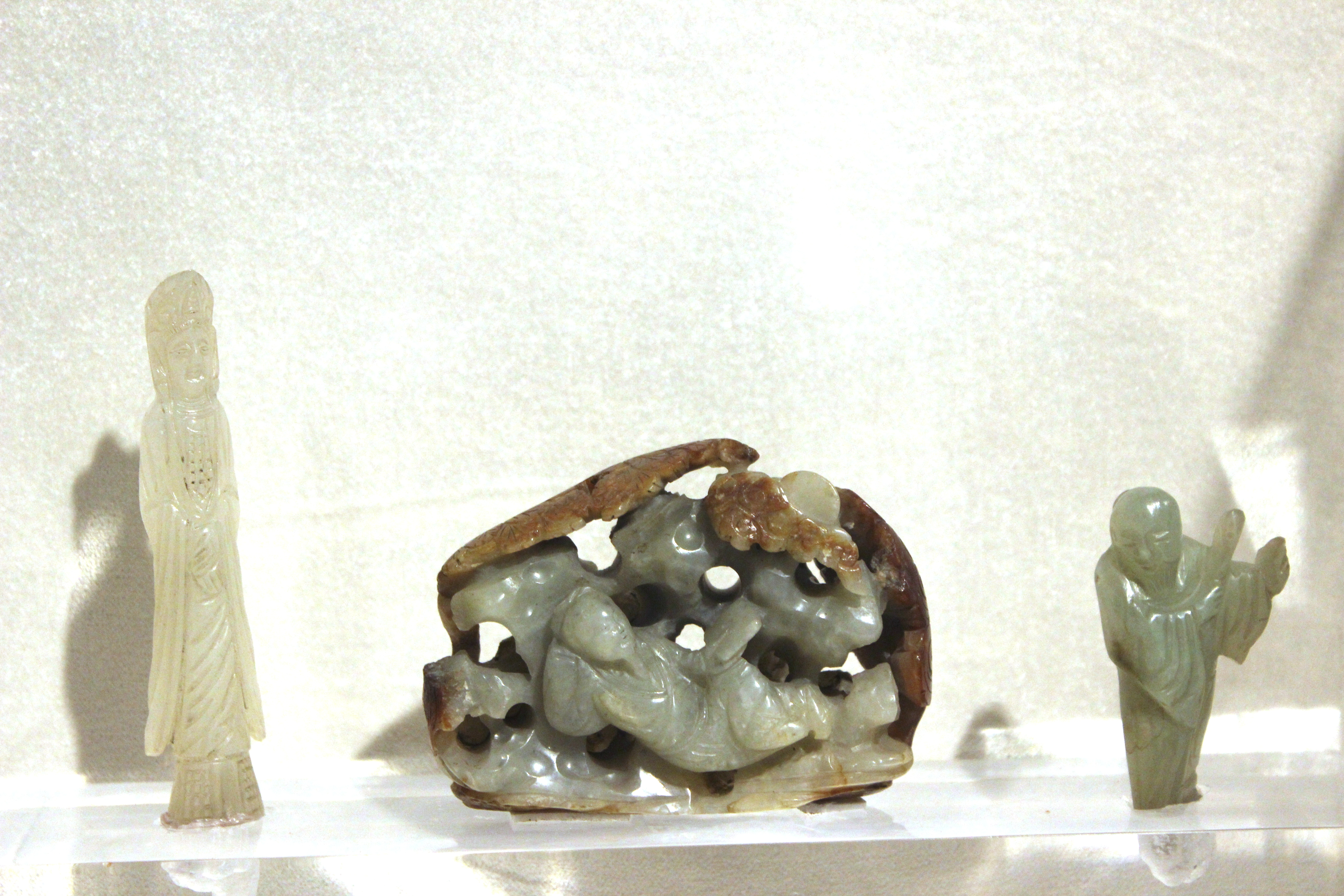
Jade Human figures made in China displayed in the Gallery

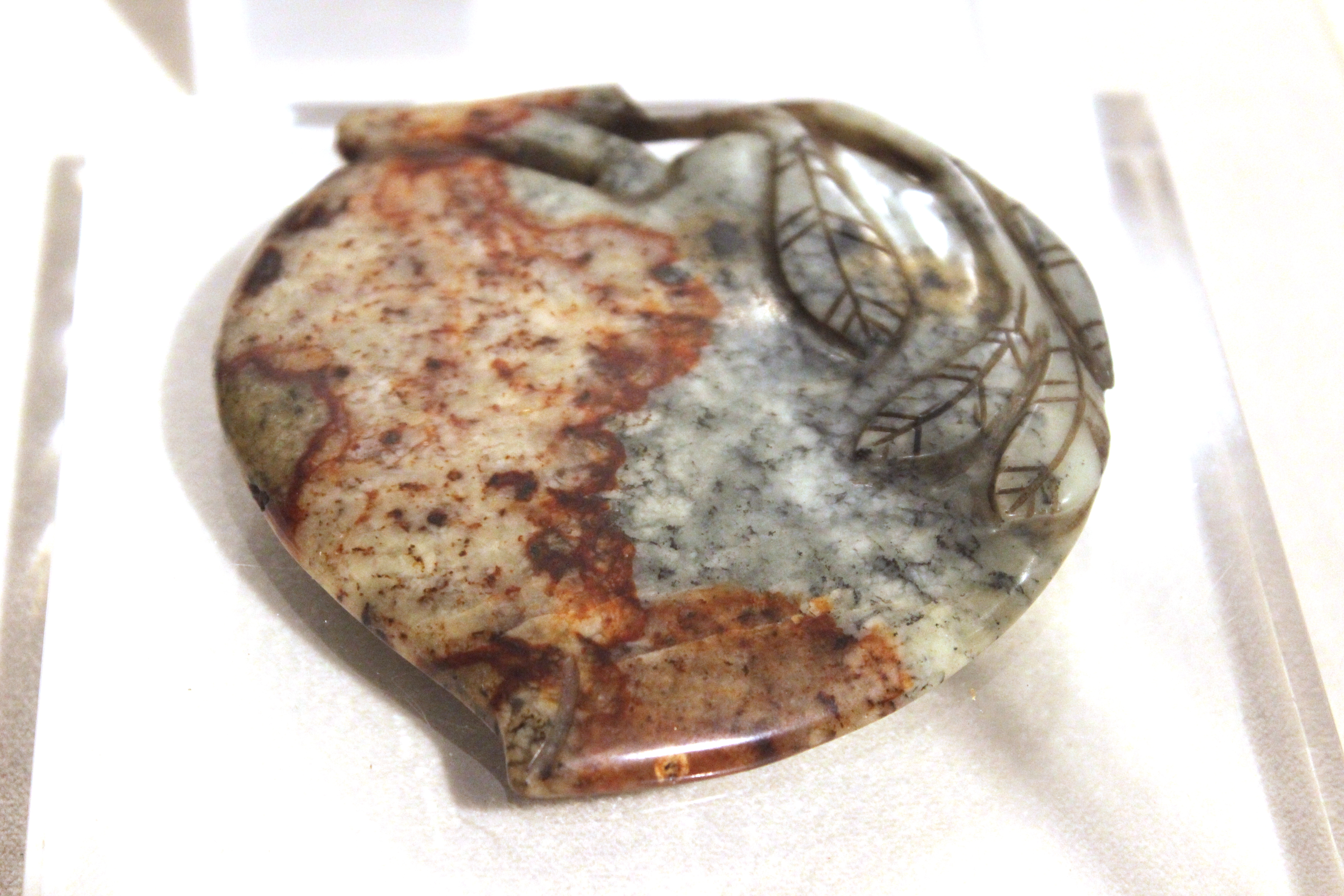
Jade Belt Buckle

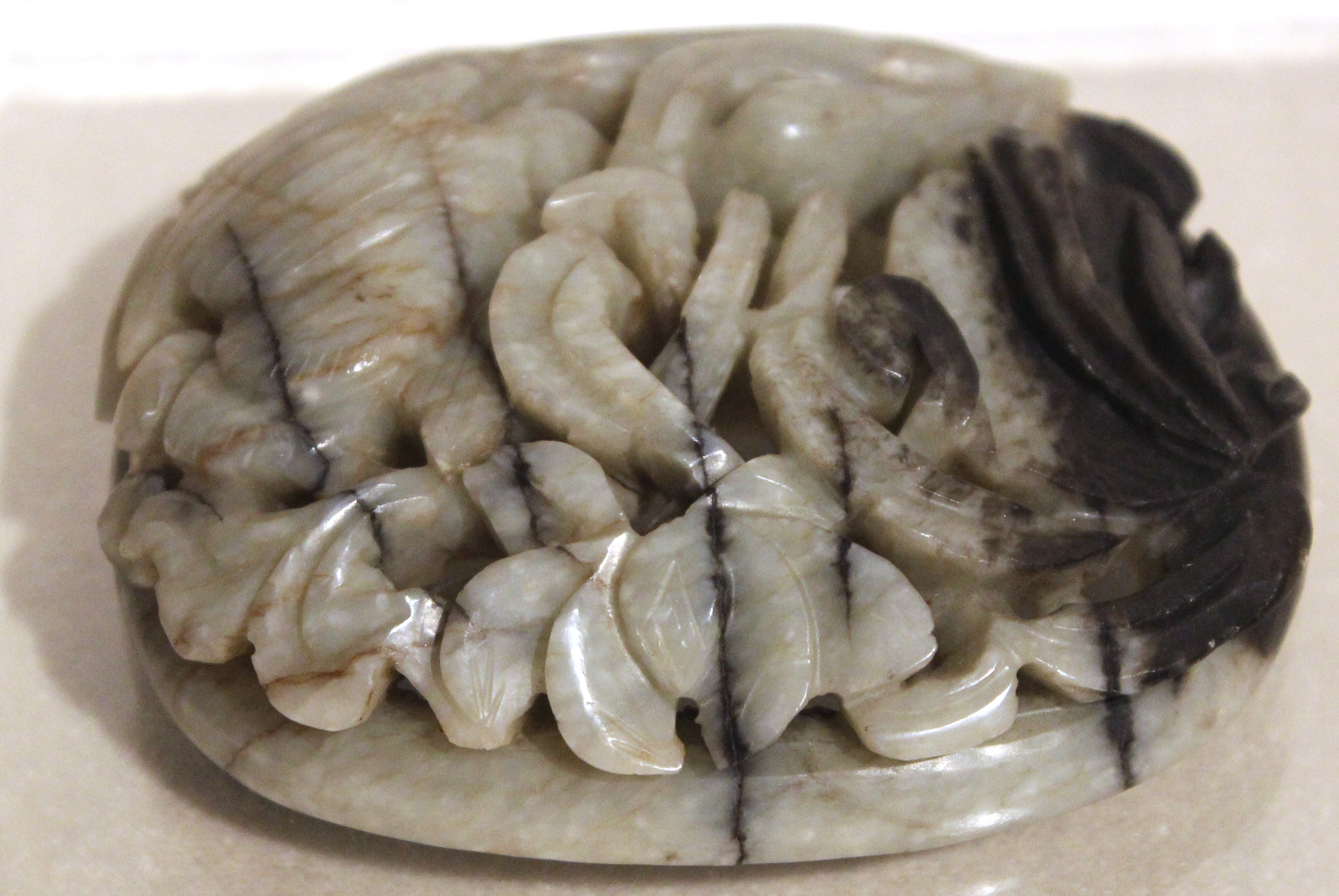
Another Artefacts from the Chinese Collection

== See also ==
- National Museum, New Delhi
- Ivory carved tusk depicting Buddha life stories
- Ivory Carved Dashavtar
- Carved wood vahanas in National Museum
