= Dashavatar (disambiguation) =

Dashavatar or Dashavtar generally refers to Dashavatara, the ten incarnations of the god Vishnu in Hindu mythology.

Dashavatar may also refer to:

- Dashavatar (2008 film), an Indian animated film about the incarnations
- Dashavatar (2025 film), an Indian Marathi-language suspense thriller film
- Dasavathaaram, released in Hindi as Dashavtar, a 2008 Indian Tamil film starring Kamal Hassan
- Dasavatharam (film), 1976 Indian Tamil film
- Dasavathaaram, a 2008 Indian Tamil film
- Dashavathara (film), a 1960 Indian Kannada film
- Dashavatari Ganjifa, ten-suited playing cards in which each suit represents an incarnation of Vishnu
- Dasavatara shrine, miniature Hindu shrine from South India
- Dashavatara Temple, Deogarh, a temple in Deogarh, Uttar Pradesh
