= Dasavatara shrine =

Ivory sculpture depicting the major avatars of the Hindu god Vishnu

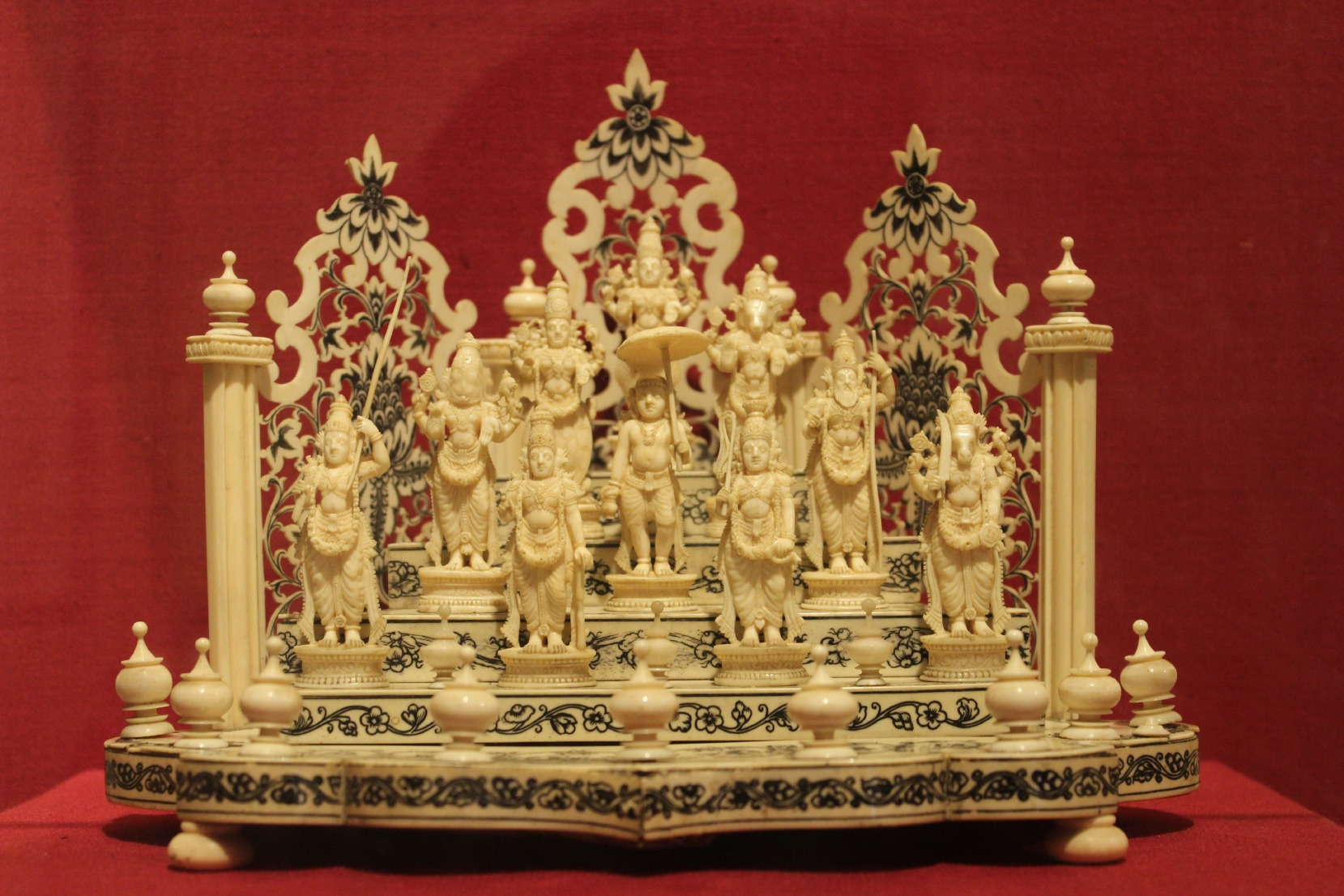
The Dasavatara shrine

The Dasavatara shrine is a miniature Hindu shrine displaying the ten incarnations of the Hindu deity Vishnu, carved in ivory and wood. The Dasavatara shrine was made in the late 18th century CE in South India. It is presently displayed in the National Museum, New Delhi.

The term Dashavatara refers to the ten main incarnations of Vishnu, generally displayed together in panels and reliefs.

== Description ==
According to the National Museum's curator, Anamika Pathak, the Dasavatara shrine is decorated with black paint, and the screen and the base of the shrine shows the signature style of craftsmanship of the Mysore school of ivory painting. All the images are fixed on a painted stepped base made of sandalwood. The base, covered completely with ivory sheet, has the traditional South Indian design of flowers, and is decorated with several knobs fixed at the bottom step. Two pillars support the fence in the background on both sides. The backdrop of the shrine is decorated with perforated ivory screen. These lattice work screens are divided into three parts by two small European style columns. An ivory strip on the wooden edges of the steps and base of the shrine depicts a foliage pattern.

== Iconography ==
There are a total of ten images featured in the Dasavatara shrine, standing upon a total of four steps, each depicting an incarnation of Vishnu.

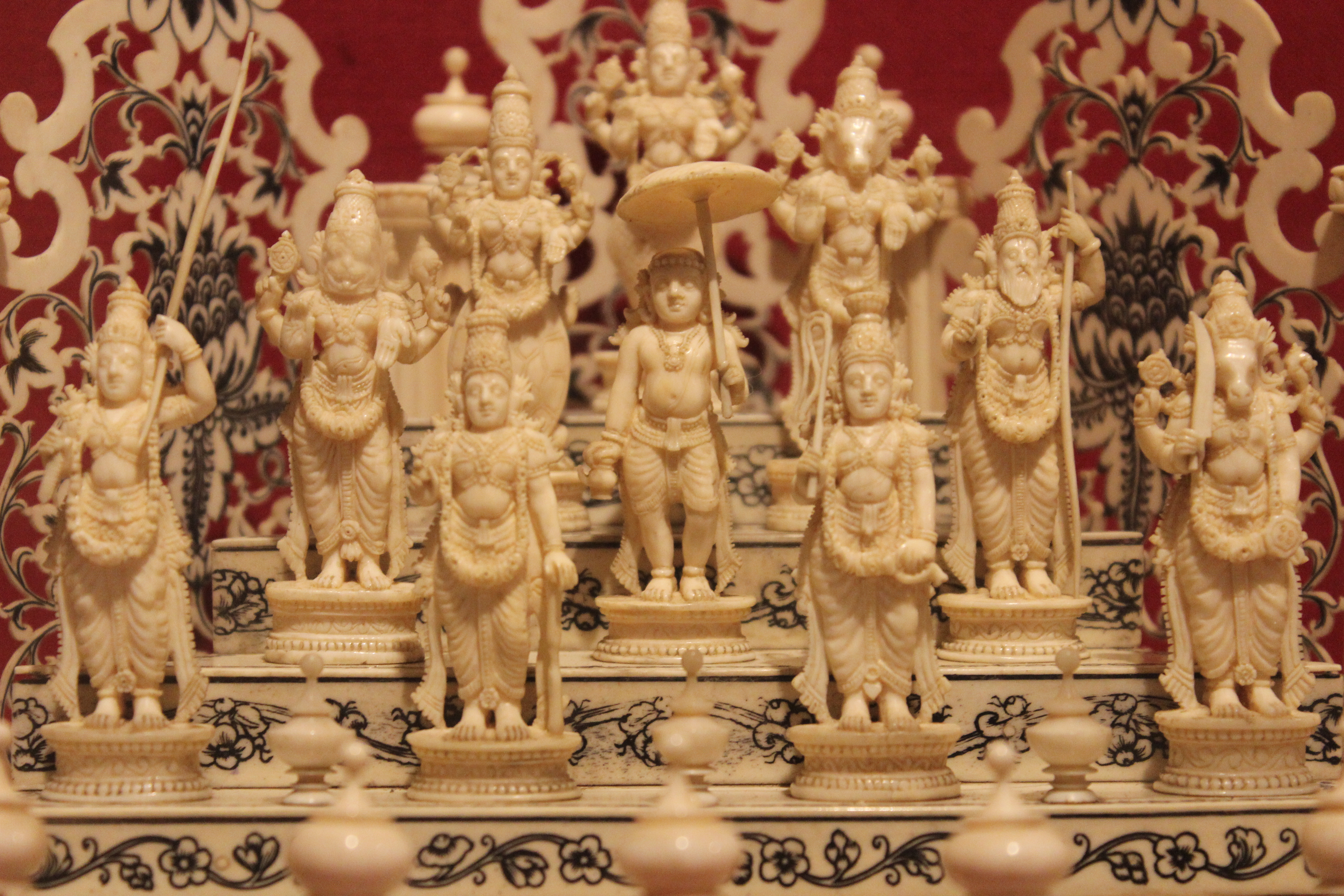
A magnified image of the Dashavatara upon the Dasavatara shrine

The first step features the Matsya avatar. The second step features the Kurma and Varaha avatars. The third step features the Narasimha, Vamana, and Parashurama avatars. The fourth step features the Rama, Balarama, Krishna, and Kalki avatars.

The Matsya, Kurma, Varaha, Narasimha and Kalki images are depicted as four-armed, which conveys the idea of Vishnu's supremacy. All of them hold Vishnu's attributes of the shankha and chakra in their two hands. Their other two hands express the abhayamudra and varadamudra; Kalki is the exception, holding a sword and a shield.

The Vamana, Parshurama, Rama, Balarama, and Krishna images are portrayed as two-armed, and hold different attributes. Vamana holds an umbrella and a kamandalam, while Parashurama carries an axe and a bow. Rama holds a bow-and-arrow, while Balarama carries a mace, his other hand expressing the abhayamudra. Krishna carries a flute and a shankha.

All the incarnations are depicted wearing a dhoti as a lower garment, and are adorned with items of jewellery such as necklaces, bangles, armlets, and the kiritamukuta, a crown worn by Vishnu. Vamana is depicted without a crown.
